= Church of St. James on Coudenberg =

Church in Brussels, Belgium

- Église Saint-Jacques-sur-Coudenberg (French); Sint-Jacob-op-Koudenbergkerk (Dutch)
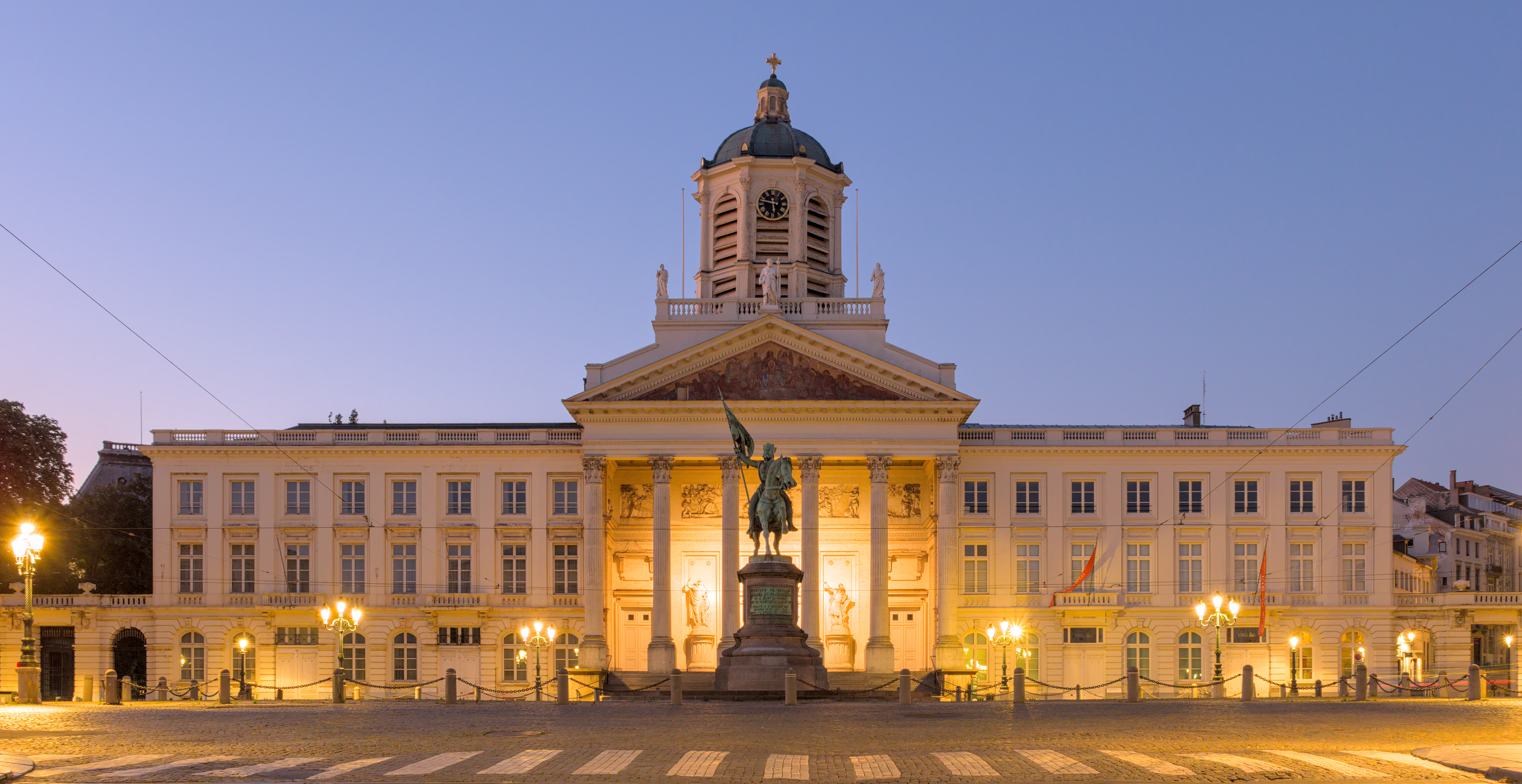
- Church of St. James on Coudenberg
- 50°50′31″N 4°21′37″E
- Location: Place Royale / Koningsplein; 1000 City of Brussels, Brussels-Capital Region
- Country: Belgium
- Denomination: Catholic Church

History
- Status: Parish church
- Dedication: Saint James

Architecture
- Functional status: Active
- Heritage designation: Protected
- Designated: 02/12/1959
- Architect: Gilles-Barnabé Guimard
- Architectural type: Church
- Style: Neoclassical
- Groundbreaking: 1776
- Completed: 1849

Administration
- Archdiocese: Mechelen–Brussels

Clergy
- Archbishop: Luc Terlinden (Primate of Belgium)

The Church of St. James on Coudenberg (French: Église Saint-Jacques-sur-Coudenberg; Dutch: Sint-Jacob-op-Koudenbergkerk) is a Catholic church on the historic Place Royale/Koningsplein, in the Royal Quarter of Brussels, Belgium. It is dedicated to Saint James, one of the Twelve Apostles of Jesus.

The neoclassical church was designed by the architects Gilles-Barnabé Guimard and Louis Montoyer and built from 1776 to 1787, replacing two neighbouring places of worship. In the 19th century, a dome and bell tower, as well as a coloured fresco, were added to it. The complex was designated a historic monument in 1959. Nowadays, it ranks as royal parish church, and since 1986, as cathedral of the Military Ordinariate of Belgium.

== History ==
=== Early history ===
The Church of St. James on Coudenberg succeeds two neighbouring places of worship, the chapel of the Palace of Coudenberg and the Coudenberg's abbey church, both demolished by command of Prince Charles Alexander of Lorraine, Governor of the Austrian Netherlands, during his expansive urban planning projects, despite having escaped the great fire of 1731 that destroyed the palace.

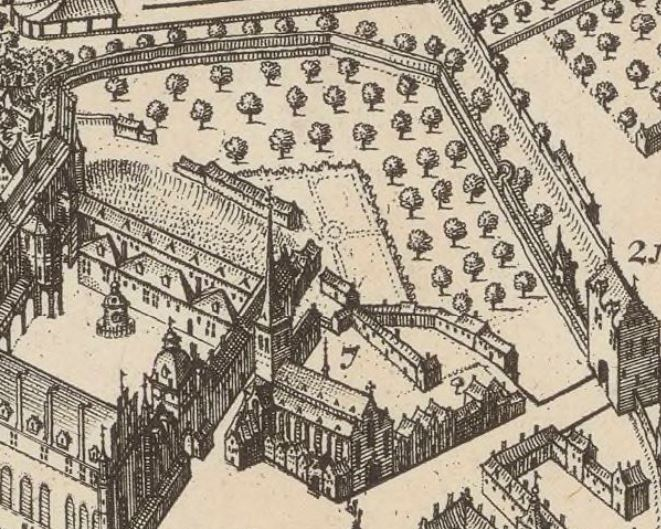
Former Coudenberg's chapel and abbey church, depicted in Bruxella, nobilissima Brabantiæ civitas (1695)

The new church was built in line with the Rue Montagne de la Cour/Hofberg on its present location on the Place Royale/Koningsplein. Construction of the façade was started by the French architect Gilles-Barnabé Guimard after the designs of Jean-Benoît-Vincent Barré (1775). The first stone was solemnly laid by Charles Alexander of Lorraine on 12 February 1776, and the portico was finished in 1780. The nave, transept, choir and sacristy were built under supervision of the Belgian-Austrian architect Louis Montoyer in 1785–86.

After the building's consecration, it was used as an abbey and parish church at the same time. Moreover, it was the official church of the court of the Governors of the Habsburg Netherlands. The present building was designed to serve as the Church of the Abbey of St. James on Coudenberg and therefore has a deep extended choir with places for choir stalls for the monks.

=== Later development ===
During the French Revolution, the abbey was suspended and the church was made into a Temple of Reason, and then later into a Temple of Law. The church was returned to Catholic control in 1802. On 21 July 1831, Prince Leopold of Saxe-Coburg-Gotha took the oath that made him King Leopold I, the first King of the Belgians, on the front steps of the church.

The building lost somewhat of its typical neoclassical temple-like appearance by the addition, in the 19th century, of a dome and bell tower (after the design of the architect Tilman-François Suys), as well as a coloured fresco by the painter Jean Portaels on the pediment.

During the 20th century, maintenance and restoration work was carried out on various occasions both inside and outside: among others in 1903–04; in 1924–25 (construction of the current steps); in 1935–36 (architect A. Delpy); in 1960–1970 (architect J. Rombaux) and in 1987 (restoration of the bell tower). The church's interior and façade were protected through a royal decree issued on 2 December 1959.

== Description ==
=== Exterior ===
The church's façade and portico, with its triangular pediment and its peristyle of six Corinthian columns, evoke the appearance of a Greco-Roman temple. The primitive bas-relief of the pediment representing The Sacrifice of the Mass by Adrien Joseph Anrion, destroyed in 1797, was replaced in 1815 by The Eye of Conscience. It was once again replaced in 1851 by the current coloured fresco by Jean Portaels depicting, on a gold background, The Consoling Virgin of the Afflicted.

Two colossal statues from the end of the 18th century, on a high cylindrical base, frame the portico between the doors: King David (by the sculptor François-Joseph Janssens) and Moses (by the sculptor Jean Philippe Augustin Ollivier). At the top of the portico's three walls are five bas-reliefs by Ollivier of Marseilles, illustrating, from left to right, Christ driving out the merchants of the Temple, Saint John Nepomucene, The martyrdom of Saint James, Saint John at Patmos and Saint Peter and Saint John healing a lame man.

The three blue stone statues of the pediment—Saint James (in the centre) with Saint Andrew (to his right) and Saint John (to his left)—dating from 1861, are the work of the sculptor Égide Mélot. They were formerly accompanied by two white stone statues of Saint Augustine and Saint John Nepomucene by Pierre Puyenbroeck, currently missing.

The building's upper part comprises a chamfered attic with lateral slopes surmounted by a rectangular balustrade and an octagonal wooden bell tower. This bell tower, painted in two shades of grey and enhanced with gold in 1987, is capped by a copper dome and a scrolled lantern bearing the cross (1849–1851).

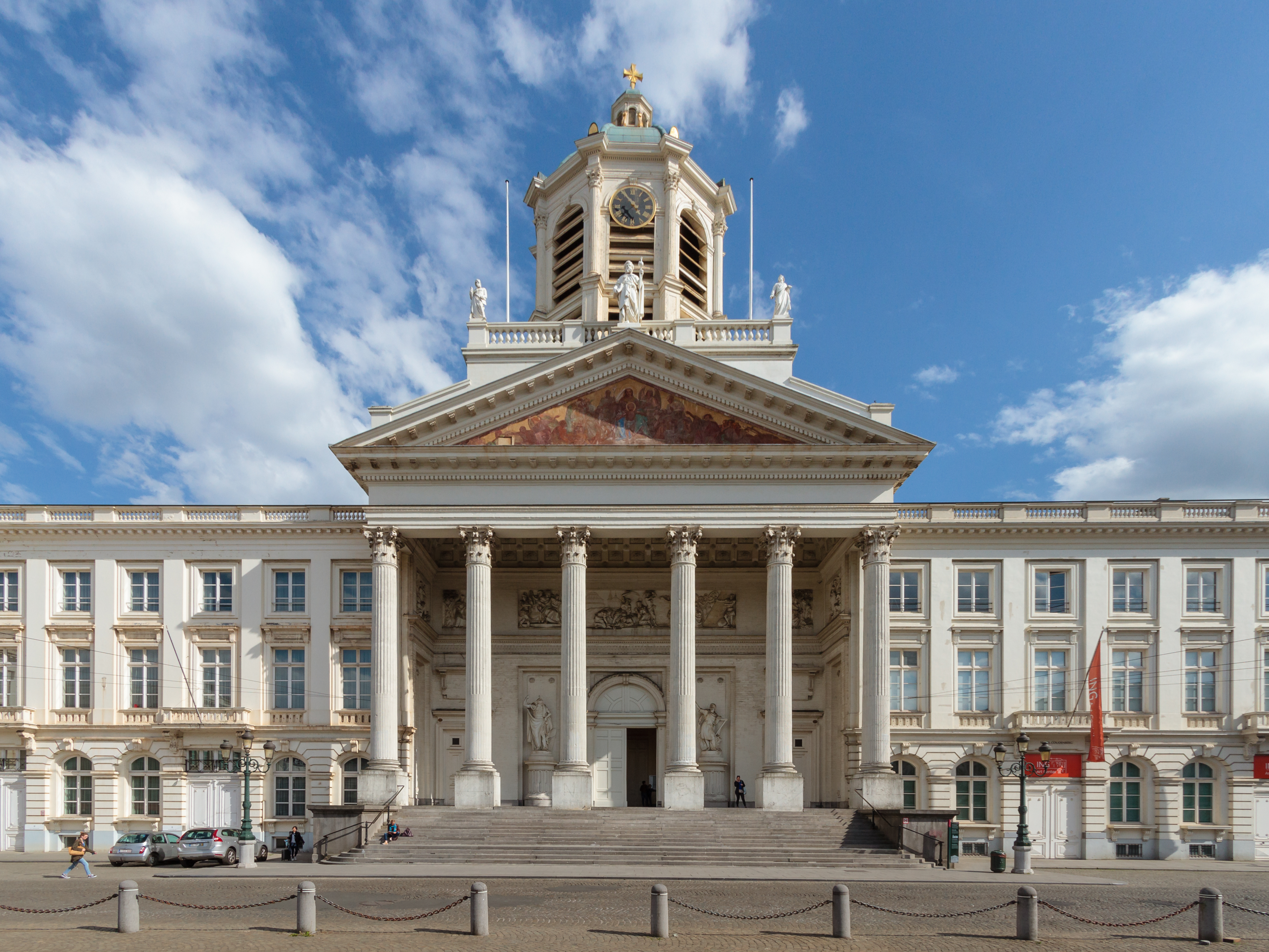
Main façade and portico

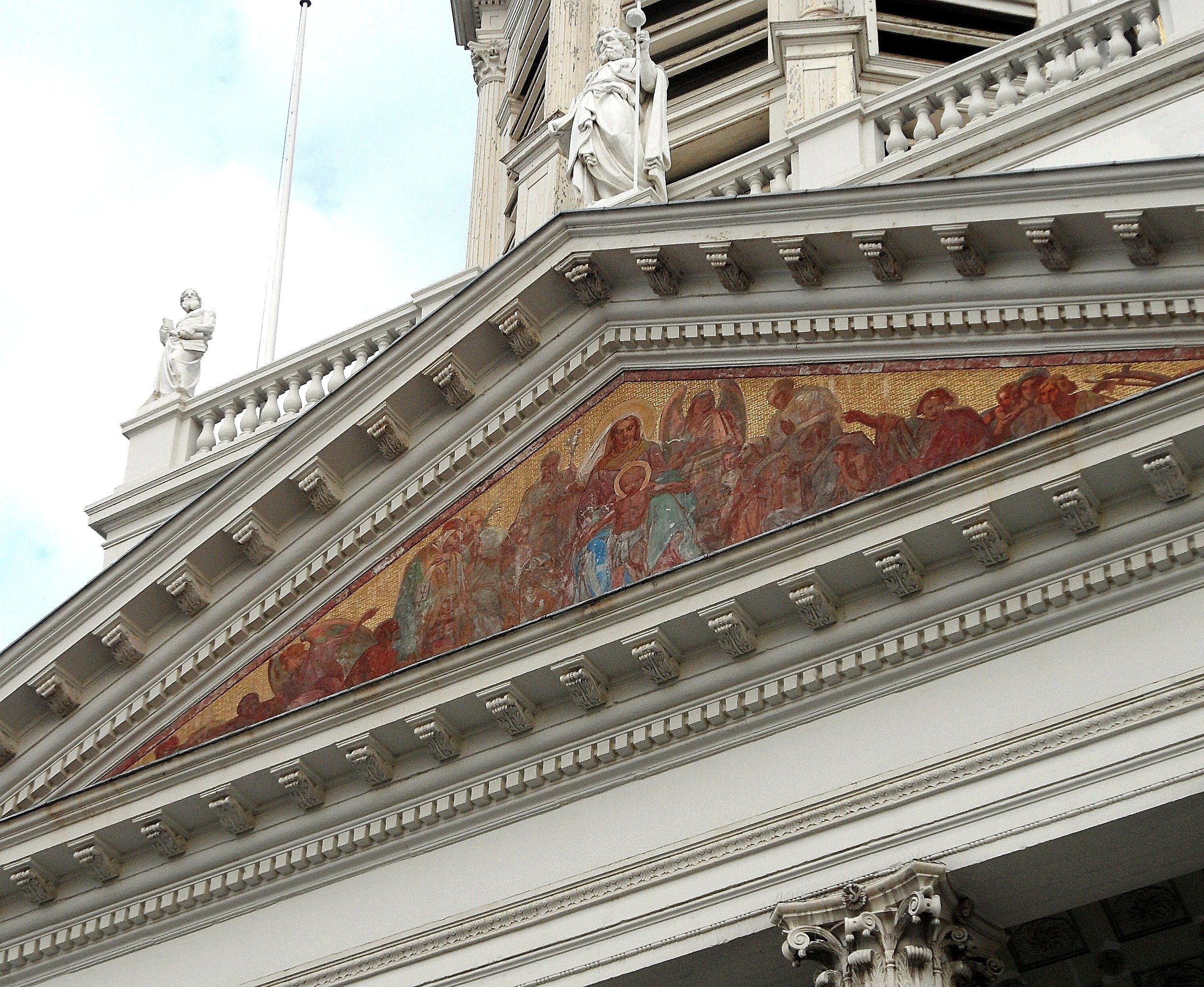
Tympanum of the pediment

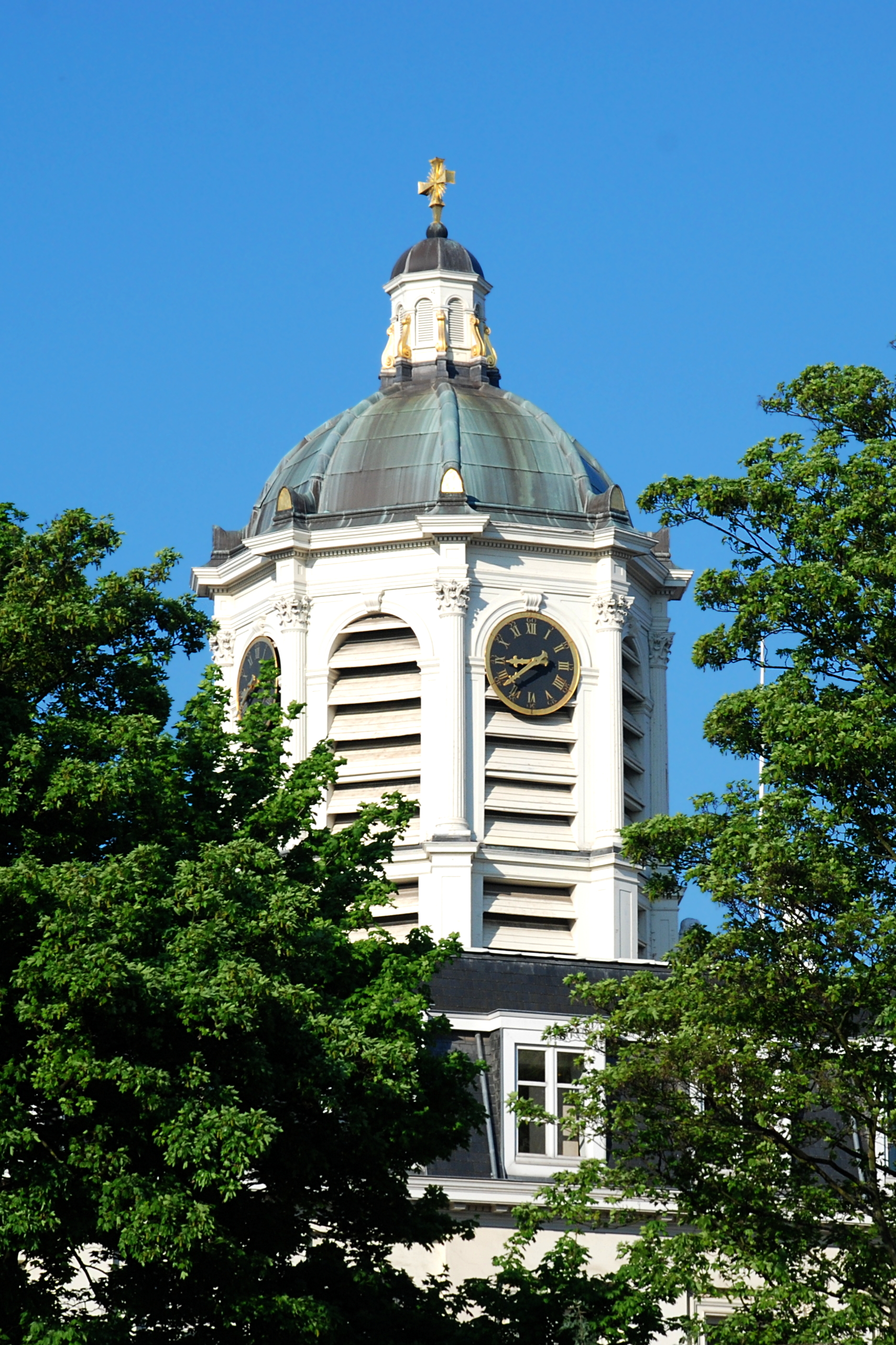
Bell tower

=== Interior ===
The interior, designed by Louis Montoyer in the neoclassical style, is sober and solemn, creating a sense of spaciousness and light. Various built-in Corinthian columns, dating from 1785–1787, line both sides of the church.

The altar in the choir, in Roman style, is made of white marble. The tabernacle comes from Cambron Abbey and was placed in the church in 1789. High above the altar, in the apse, are bas-reliefs in stucco or painted blue stone representing The Nativity, The Last Supper and The Entombment. To the left of the altar is a white statue representing The Old Testament, and to the right The New Testament. These works were all designed by the sculptor Gilles-Lambert Godecharle. At the division between the side altar and the main altar, on the left, is another white marble statue by Adrien Joseph Anrion, depicting Saint Peter, and on the right is a statue by the same sculptor representing Religion.

In the central nave is a nomenclature of the parishioners who lost their lives for the fatherland during the First World War. Opposite is the pulpit built by Jozef Van Meeuwen (1793). Close to this masterpiece is a sculpture of Saint Joseph and Child, sculpted in 1746 by Laurent Delvaux. Above it hang memorial plaques of Prince Philippe, Count of Flanders and his wife, Princess Marie of Hohenzollern-Sigmaringen, the parents of the late King Albert I. Also in the central nave is a polychrome wooden statue by Ch. Vlaminck (1888) depicting Saint James. At both ends of the transept are two large paintings by Jean-François Portaels: The Crucifixion and The Cross, while the relief The Stations of the Cross, hanging in the side aisles, is the work of the sculptor Jean Geefs.

The church also has a gallery pipe organ, dating from 1844, the work of the organ-builder Pierre Schyven. Some parts of the case come from an older work of art, designed by Koenraad van Eyck in the 18th century.

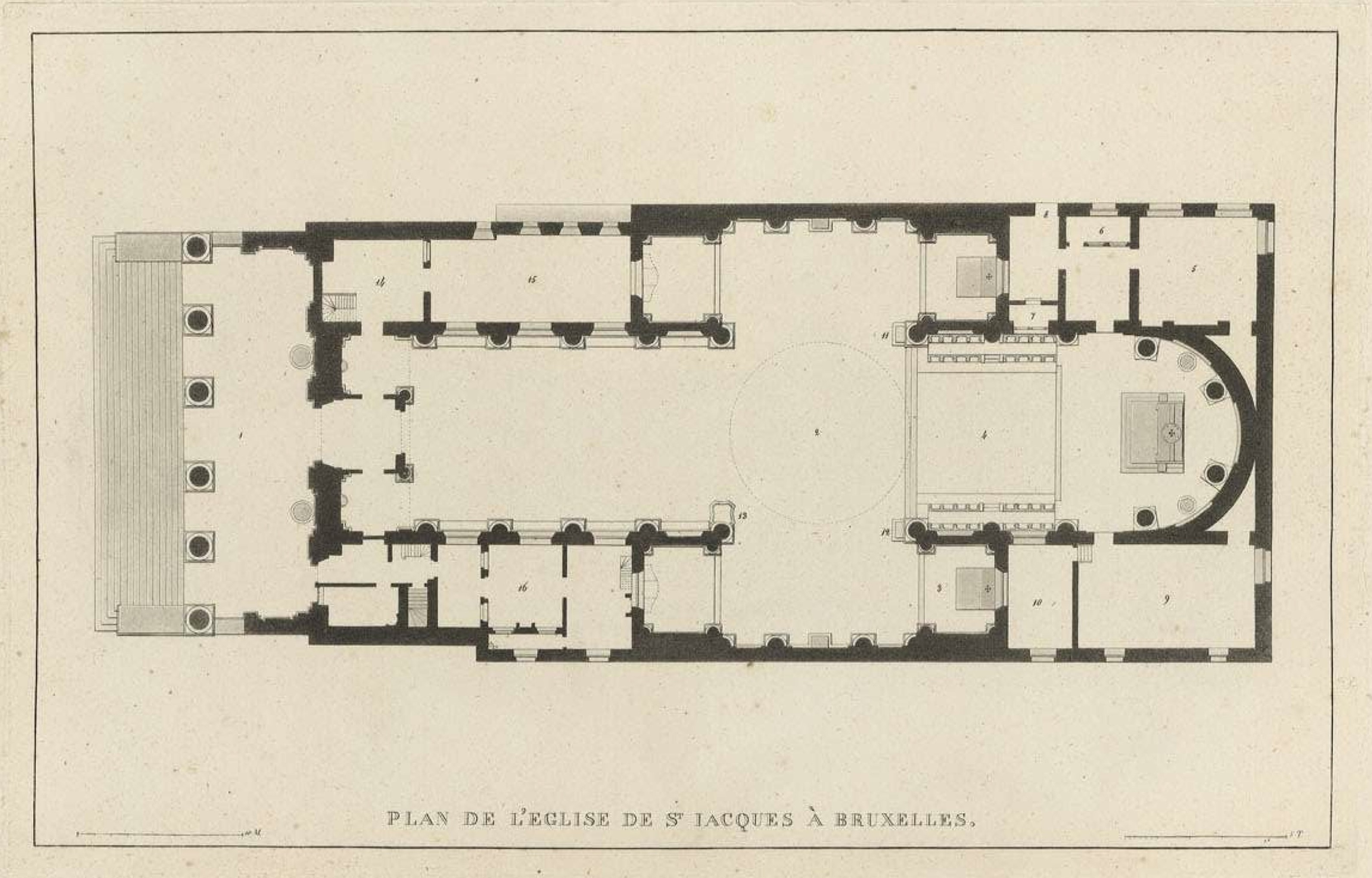
Floor plan of the church, from Pierre-Jacques Goetghebuer's Choix des monuments (1827)

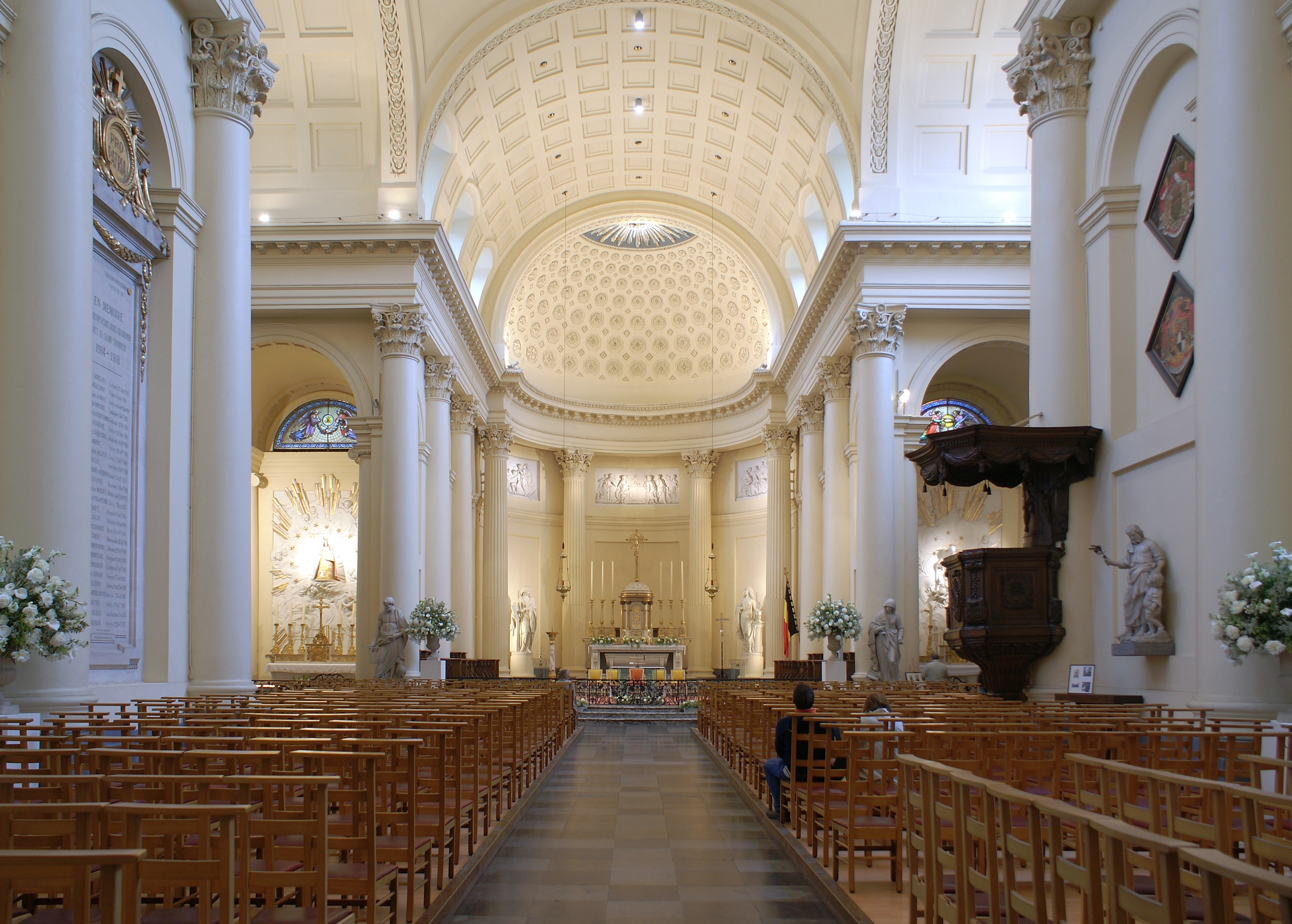
Interior of the nave and choir

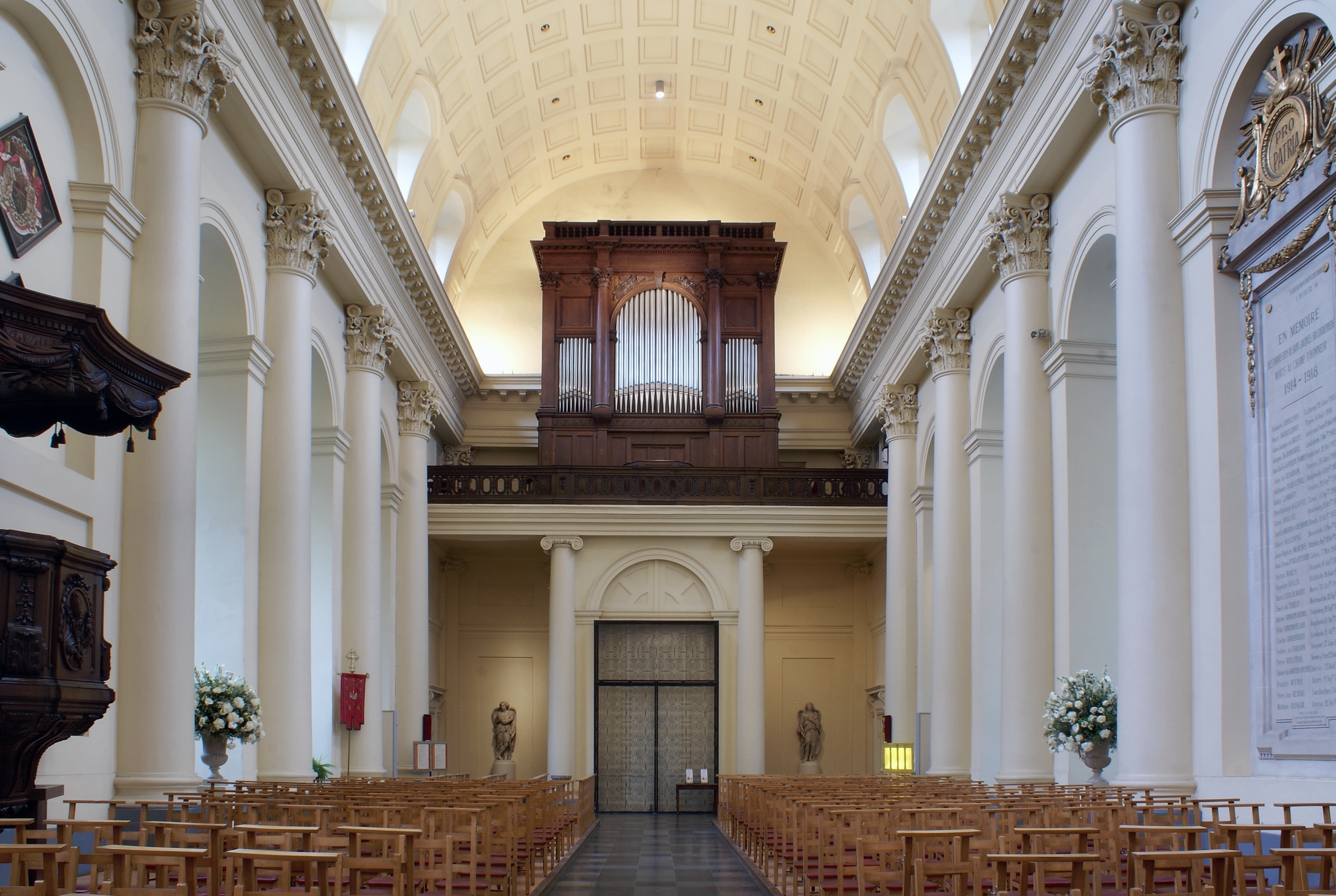
Built-in Corinthian columns, nave and organ

== See also ==
- List of churches in Brussels
- Catholic Church in Belgium
- Neoclassical architecture in Belgium
- History of Brussels
- Culture of Belgium
- Belgium in the long nineteenth century
