= Place Royale, Brussels =

Square in Brussels, Belgium

Place Royale (French); Koningsplein (Dutch)
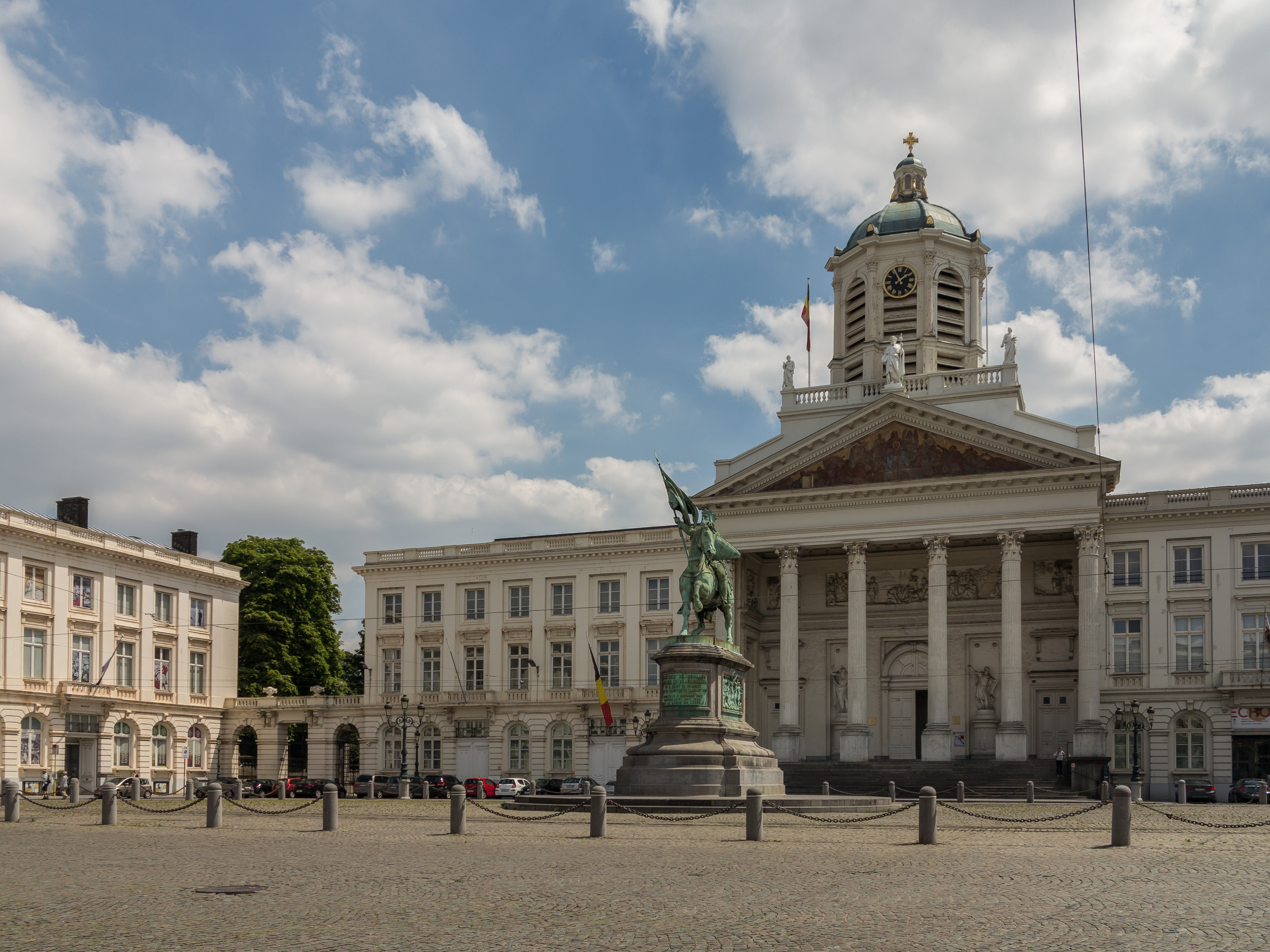
- The Place Royale/Koningsplein with the statue of Godfrey of Bouillon in its centre

- Location within Brussels Location within Belgium
- Type: Square
- Length: 113 m (371 ft)
- Width: 77 m (253 ft)
- Location: City of Brussels, Brussels-Capital Region, Belgium
- Quarter: Royal Quarter
- Postal code: 1000
- Nearest metro station: 1 5 Parc/Park and 2 6 Trône/Troon
- Coordinates: 50°50′32″N 04°21′34″E

Construction
- Completed: c. 1782

Other
- Designer: Jean-Benoît-Vincent Barré, Gilles-Barnabé Guimard

The Place Royale (French, pronounced [plas ʁwa.jal]; "Royal Square") or Koningsplein (Dutch, pronounced [ˈkoːnɪŋsˌplɛin]; "King's Square") is a historic neoclassical square in the Royal Quarter of Brussels, Belgium. Modelled after the so-called French royal square and built between 1775 and 1782, according to a plan of the architects Jean-Benoît-Vincent Barré and Gilles-Barnabé Guimard, to replace the former Palace of Coudenberg, it was part of an urban project including Brussels Park.

The Place Royale is one of oldest architecturally consistent and monumental public squares, as well as an excellent example of 18th-century urban architecture. Rectangular and symmetrical in shape, it measures 77 by 113 metres (253 by 371 ft), and is entirely paved. In its centre stands an equestrian statue of Godfrey of Bouillon. It is also flanked by the Church of St. James on Coudenberg, as well as some of the main museums in the city.

The Rue de Namur/Naamsestraat enters the square from the south, the Rue de la Régence/Regentschapstraat from the south-west, and the Rue Montagne de la Cour/Hofbergstraat and the Mont des Arts/Kunstberg from the north-west. This area is served by Brussels-Central railway station, as well as by the metro stations Parc/Park (on lines 1 and 5) and Trône/Troon (on lines 2 and 6).

== History ==
=== Early history ===
The Place Royale was built on the former site of the Place des Bailles/Baliënplein, the main market square adjacent to the former Castle and then Palace of Coudenberg, which was the residence (and seat of power) of the counts, dukes, archdukes, kings, emperors or governors who, from the 12th century to the 18th century, exerted their sovereignty over the Duchy of Brabant and later over all or part of the Burgundian and then Spanish and Austrian Netherlands. This first square, whose initial enclosure was made of wood (1434), was provided in 1509 with a new stone fence designed by the court architects Antoon I Keldermans and Antoon II Keldermans.

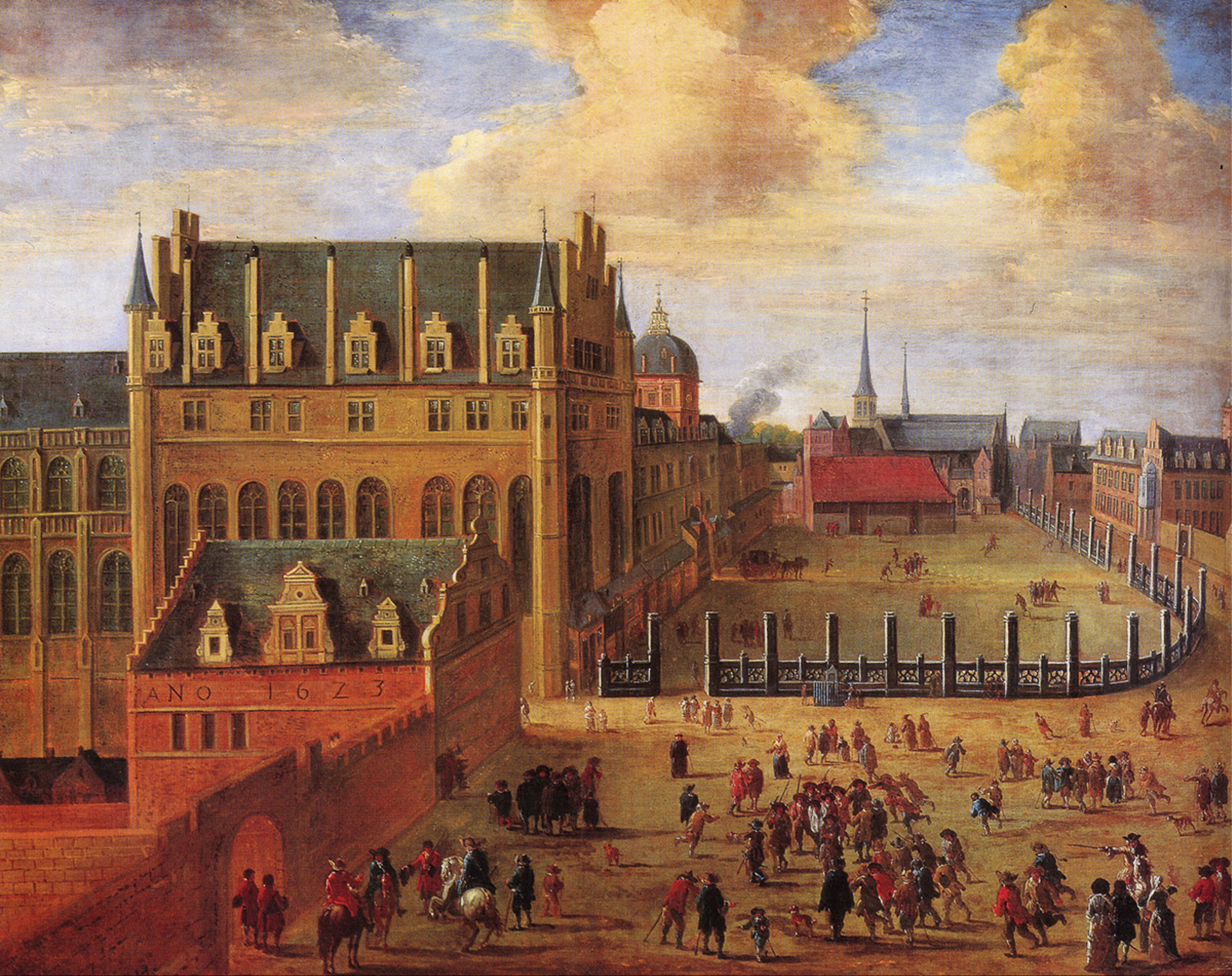
View of the Palace of Coudenberg and the Place des Bailles/Baliënplein, between 1679 and 1700

The palace burned down on the night of 3 February 1731 in a fire that took much of the original royal complex. Funds were not available for rebuilding, so for more than forty years, it remained in a state of ruin, known as the Cour brûlée ("Burnt Court"). Several projects for the redevelopment of this space were proposed, including the reconstruction of a palace, which did not go beyond the stage of sketches, for lack of money. The construction of a new palace also seemed to be all the less necessary since, in the meantime, the court had moved to the Palace of Orange-Nassau, on the site of today's Palace of Charles of Lorraine. In 1769, the idea germinated to clear and level the ruins of the Place des Bailles and to convert it into an esplanade intended for military parades. The plan was on the verge of completion in 1772, when another project rendered it obsolete.

=== Clearance and development ===
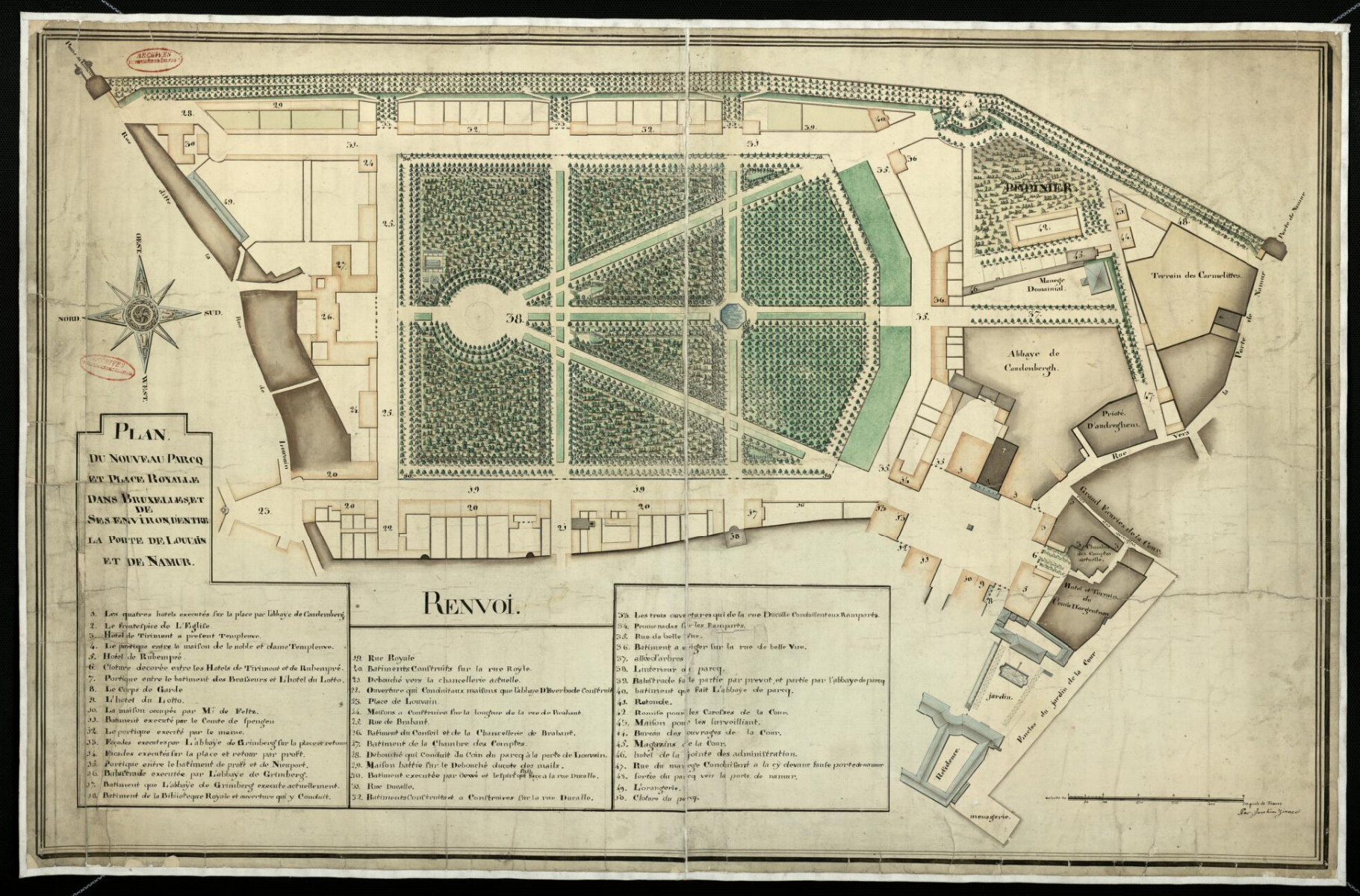
Plan of the Place Royale and Brussels Park by Joachim Zinner, 1780

It was only in 1774 that Prince Charles Alexander of Lorraine, Governor-General of the Austrian Netherlands, proposed replacing the ruins with a monumental royal square inspired by French models such as the Place Stanislas in Nancy (1755) and the Place Royale in Reims (1759), of which it is almost an exact replica. The project was approved that same year by Empress Maria Theresa of Austria, who authorised the demolition. If at the beginning, this space, intended to be decorated with a statue of the governor, was sometimes called the Place de Lorraine ("Lorraine Square") in his honour, it is finally the name Place Royale ("Royal Square") that was retained, according to the predominant model in France, which appeared more suitable to represent political power.

Construction of the new buildings around the square took from 1775 to 1782, using the neoclassical design of the French architects Jean-Benoît-Vincent Barré, who drafted the basic project, and Gilles-Barnabé Guimard, who received that commission in 1769 and who carried out the detailed plans. The first draft of the project, designed by the engineers-architects Louis-Joseph Baudour and Claude Fisco had planned to keep the Gothic chapel of the former palace, which had been spared by the fire. Due to the architectural clash with the surrounding neoclassical buildings, however, it was pulled down. This plan was modified around 1780 by the Austrian landscape architect Joachim Zinner, who imagined connecting the square to the new Palace of Charles of Lorraine and Brussels Park (housing a statue of Empress Maria Theresa, which was never carried out). The new district, known today as the Royal Quarter, and designed on a structure connecting these three strategic points, also aimed to relieve congestion in this part of the city.

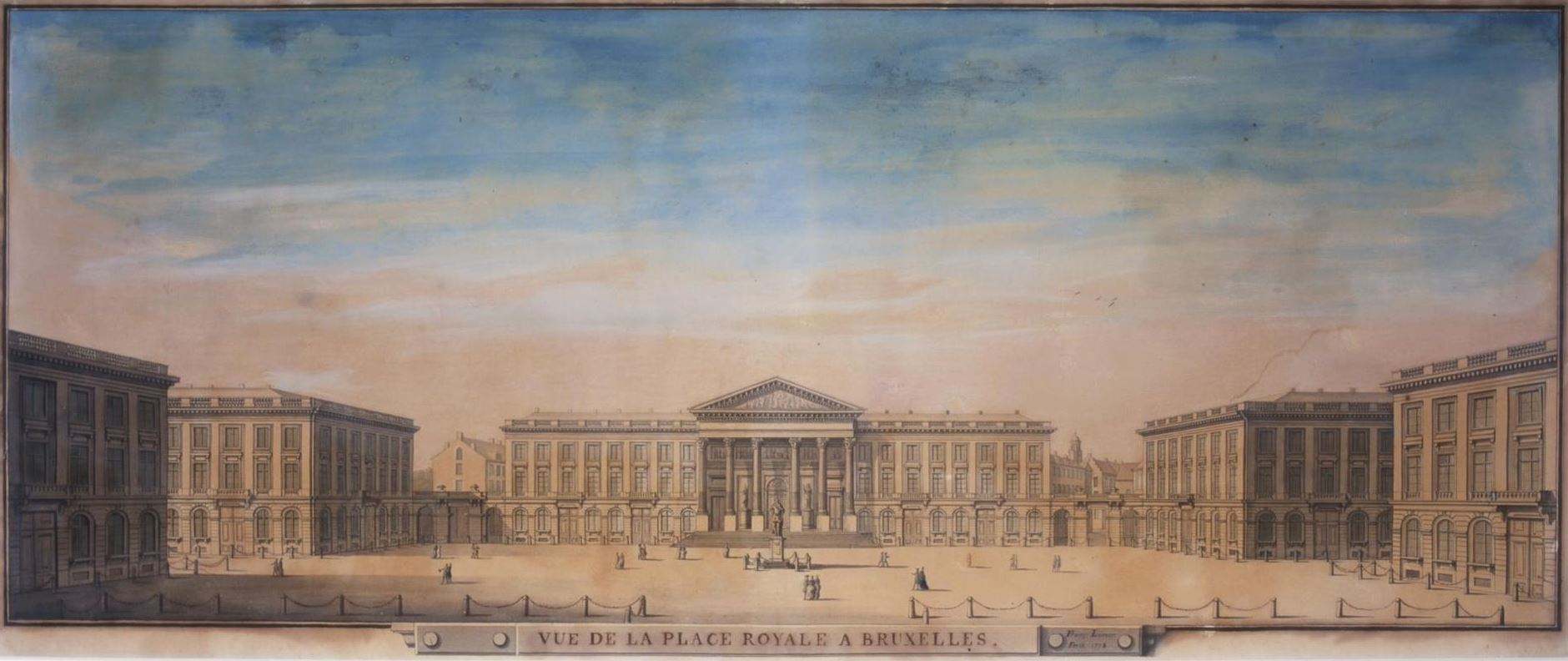
The Place Royale in 1778, shortly before completion

The former statue of Charles Alexander of Lorraine, which stood at the centre of the square, was made by the Flemish sculptor and architect Peter Anton von Verschaffelt. It showed the governor standing, dressed as a Roman general draped in a consular mantle, attending to the affairs of state. French revolutionaries toppled the statue when they entered Brussels in January 1793. Replaced during the brief Austrian restoration, this new statue was also knocked down by the French, who this time melted it down, turned it into coins, and planted a "Liberty tree" on its site. This tree was itself felled in 1814, during the fall of the Napoleonic Empire.

=== 19th and 20th centuries ===
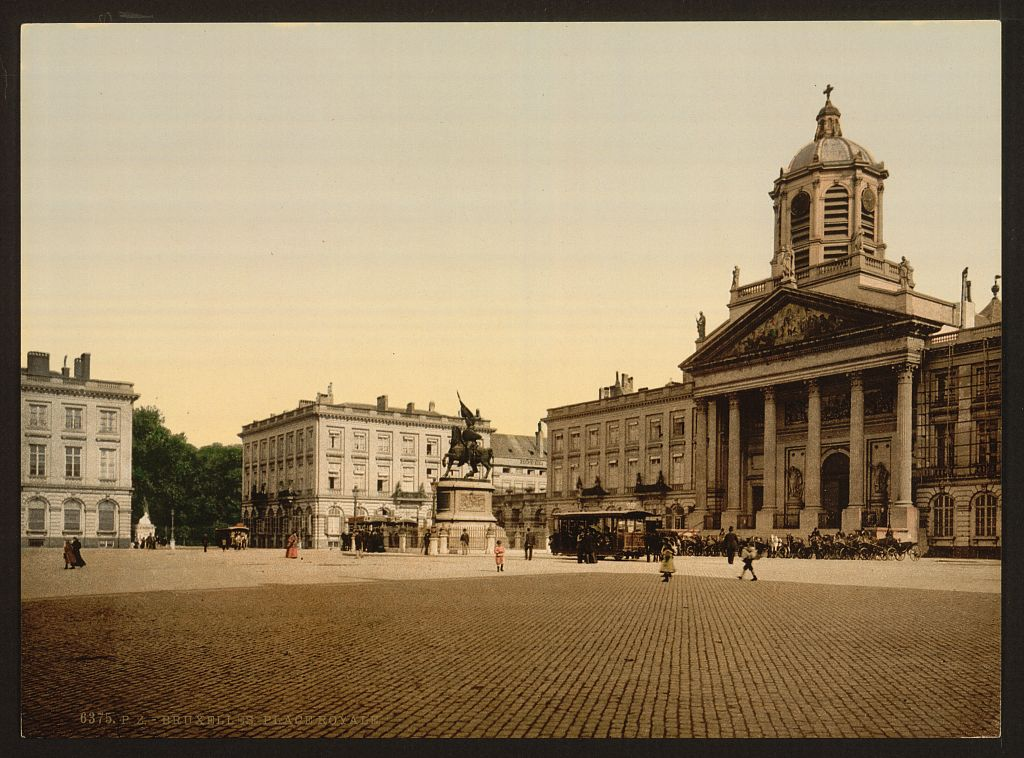
The Place Royale in the late 19th century

In the following centuries, official ceremonies and political demonstrations were occasionally held on the square. Cavalcades were organised there in honour of Napoleon in 1810. It is still there that was celebrated the inauguration of William I as ruler of the Netherlands on 21 September 1815. During the Belgian Revolution in 1830, a barricade was erected across the eastern exit of the square next to the current BELvue Museum, facing Brussels Park, with two cannon positioned on it. On 21 July 1831, King Leopold I took the oath as the first King of the Belgians before members of Congress on a platform in front of the Church of St. James on Coudenberg. The funerals of King Leopold III and Prince Charles, prince-regent between 1944 and 1950, also took place on the square.

Remaining empty for several decades, from 1848, the centre of the square was once again occupied by a monument (still present today), an equestrian statue of Godfrey of Bouillon, built at a time when the young Belgian state was in search of patriotic landmarks. The blue stone posts connected by iron chains that originally lined the square disappeared in the middle of the 19th century and were replaced by pavements.

By the turn of the 20th century, the Place Royale increasingly became a hub of intense traffic, first with the addition of a horse-drawn tramway (later electrified), then through the rise of the automobile; the statue having roundabout function, from 1921, for north–south and east–west traffic. During the German occupation in the Second World War, Military Governor of Belgium, Alexander von Falkenhausen, established his headquarters at the Place Royale. In 1951, the façades and porticoes lining the square were recognised for their architectural and historical interest, and were definitively protected from any modification by a classification order on the Belgian Heritage List.

== Present day and future ==
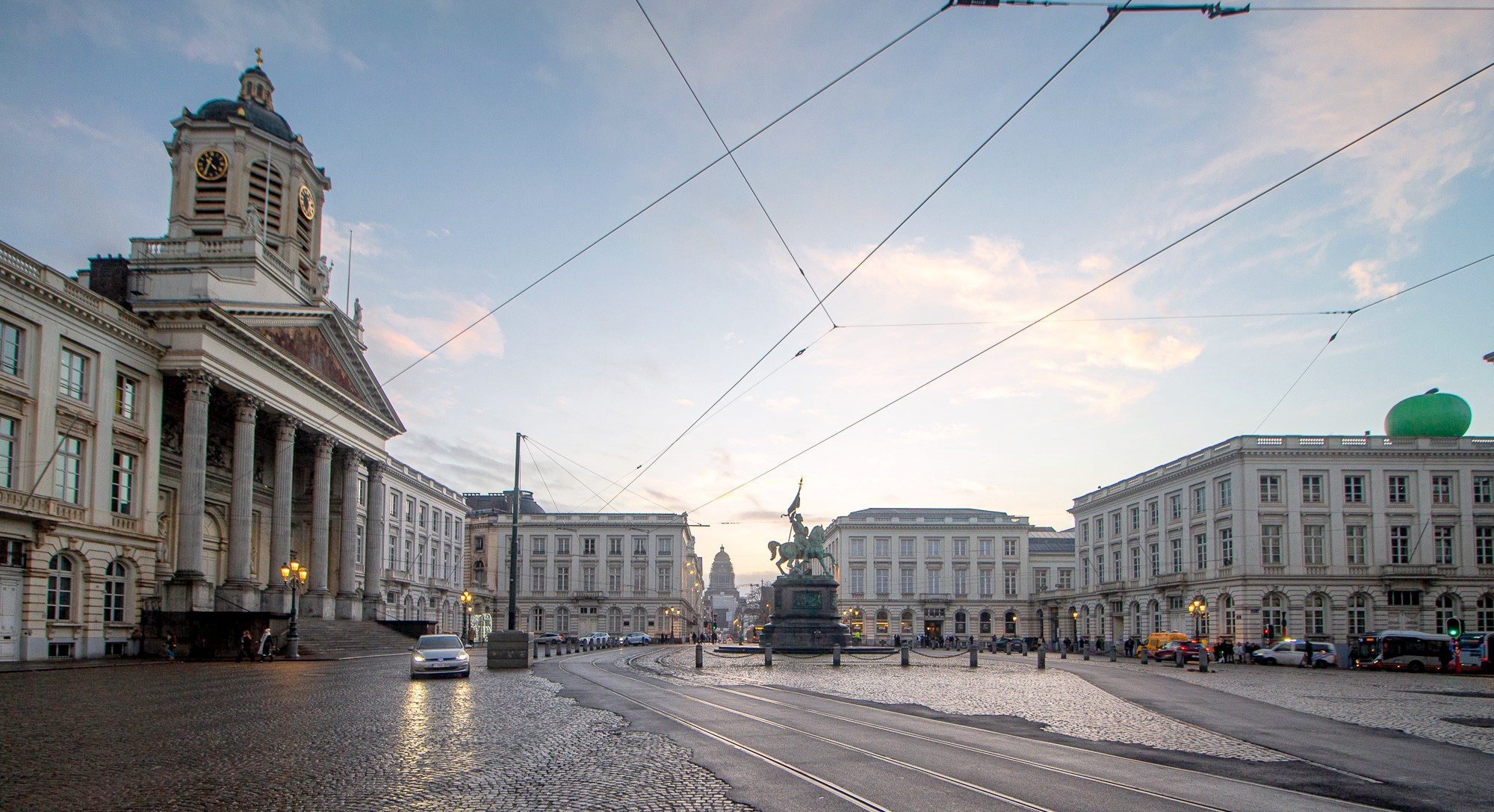
View southwards across the Place Royale showing the Church of St. James on Coudenberg on the left. The Palace of Justice can be seen in the background.

In the north-western corner of the Place Royale lies an archaeological area. Under the paving stones of the square, excavated between 1995 and 2000 and then covered by a concrete slab, are the remains levelled at the end of the 18th century during the development of the square, as well as of the Aula Magna, the great hall of the former Coudenberg Palace. Classified as a historical monument, these remains are part of a larger ensemble accessible from the BELvue Museum. Below the square also lies the so-called Rue Isabelle/Isabellastraat ("Isabella Street"), a former street that connected the Palace to the Church of St. Michael and St. Gudula (now Brussels' cathedral). Guimard had the street vaulted as part of the square's construction, with the intention of converting it into cellars. The lower rooms of these buildings also partially survived the fire, and are exposed in the archaeological site.

In 2014, the City of Brussels announced plans to restore the square's buildings and atmosphere, with wider pavements, new lighting and better enhancement of the façades. The work was scheduled to start in 2019 and end in 2020. However, the project did not see the light of day. New plans were put forward in 2021 with the public inquiry led by the City, the heritage organisation Beliris, and the Brussels Secretary of State for Urbanism and Heritage, Pascal Smet (one.brussels). If currently, 20% of the Place Royale is devoted to pedestrians and 80% to motorised traffic, the objective of the redevelopment project is to reverse this trend. Most of the square will therefore be on one level and the traffic lanes will be modified. The natural stone pavements, dating from the 18th century, will be preserved, as will the lampposts and paving stones already installed. Final plans were put to public consultation in 2021, and work began in 2023.

== Layout ==
Rectangular and symmetrical in shape (approximately 77 by 113 metres (253 by 371 ft)), the Place Royale follows the neoclassical principles, and is modelled after the so-called French royal square, as developed at the end of the 17th century. Its buildings being burdened with an architectural servitude, it has undergone few changes since its creation in the 18th century: the statue of Godfrey of Bouillon has replaced that of Prince Charles Alexander of Lorraine and the original colonnade that enclosed it to the south was destroyed during the opening of the Rue de la Régence/Regentschapstraat in 1827.

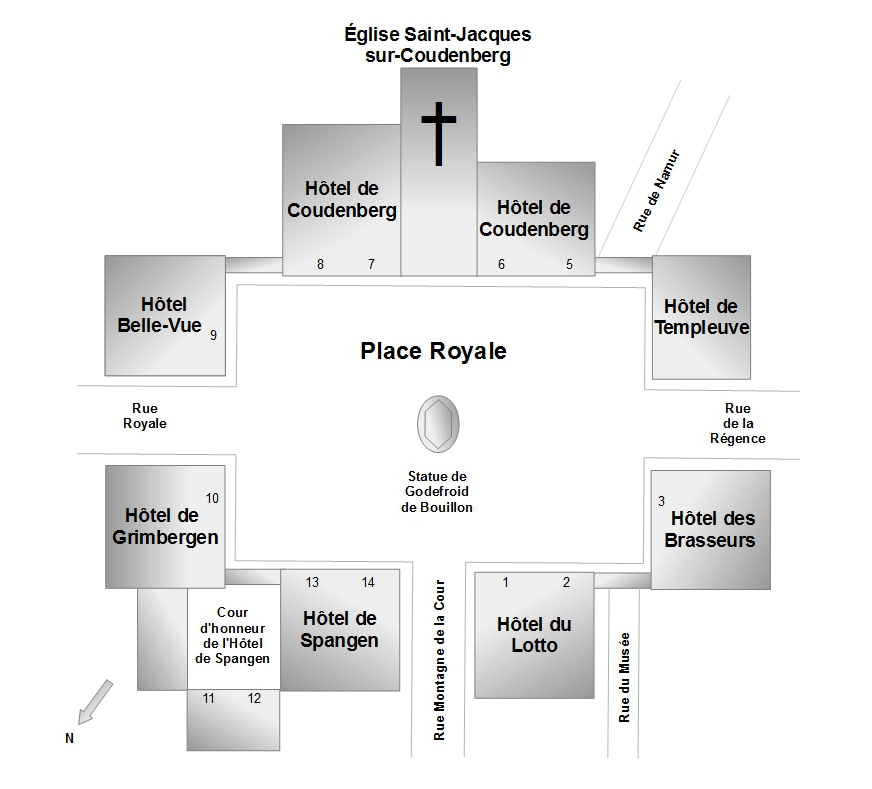
Plan of the Place Royale

The square is surrounded by many museums and cultural institutions, including the BELvue Museum, the Royal Museums of Fine Arts of Belgium, the Musical Instruments Museum (MIM) (which is housed in the former Old England department store), the remains of the former Coudenberg Palace (whose entrance is through the BELvue Museum), and the Magritte Museum. Other major tourist attractions are located within walking distance: Brussels Park, the Royal Palace, and the Cathedral of St. Michael and St. Gudula.

=== Church of St. James on Coudenberg ===
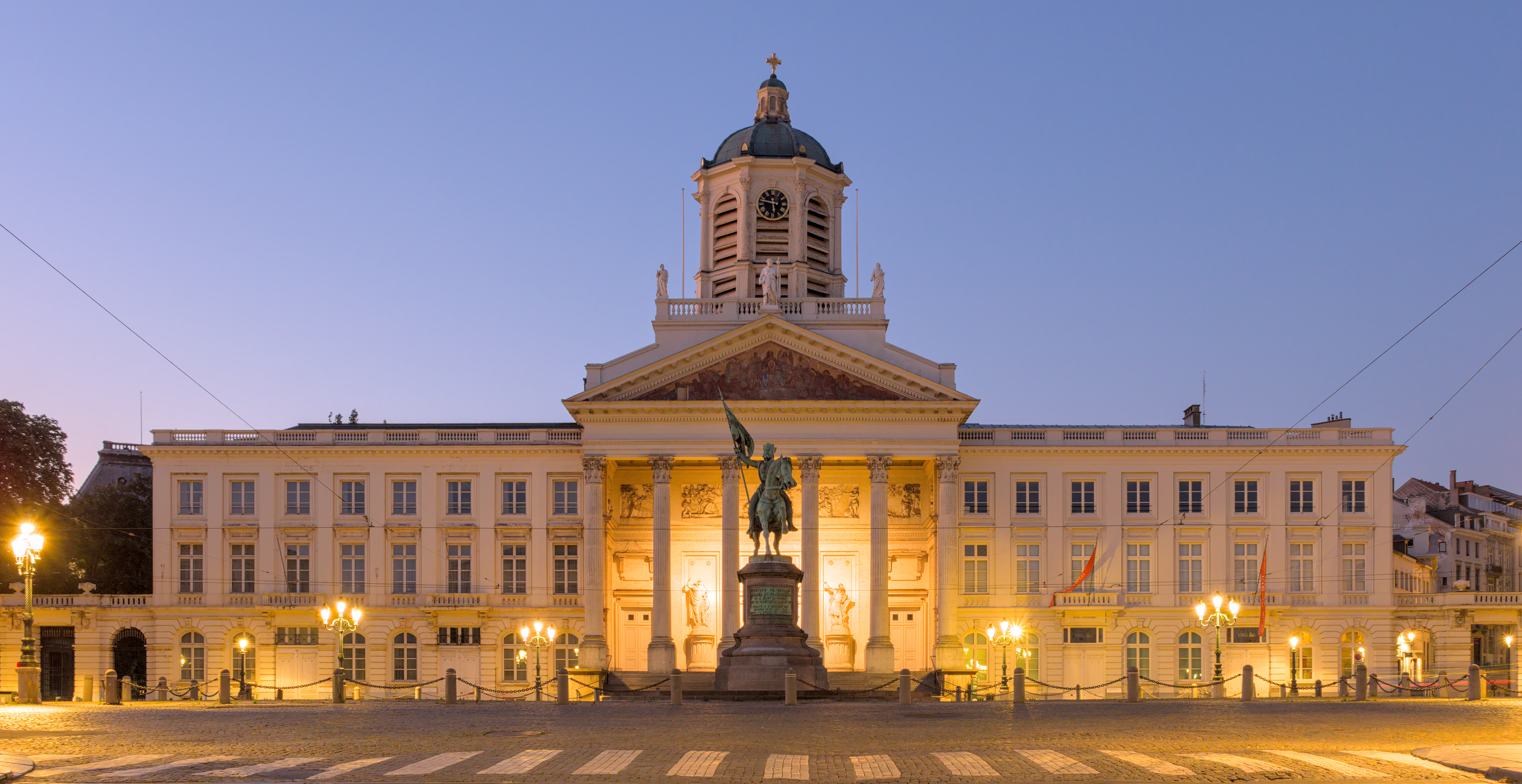
The Place Royale, fronted by the Church of St. James on Coudenberg

The principal building on the square is the neoclassical Church of St. James on Coudenberg, consecrated in 1787, and designed by Gilles-Barnabé Guimard after the designs of Jean-Benoît-Vincent Barré. It succeeds two neighbouring places of worship: the chapel of the Coudenberg Palace and the Coudenberg's abbey church, both demolished by command of Charles Alexander of Lorraine during his expansive urban planning projects, despite having escaped the great fire of 1731 that destroyed the palace. The first stone was solemnly laid by Charles Alexander of Lorraine on 12 February 1776, and the portico was finished in 1780. The nave, transept, choir and sacristy were built under supervision of Louis Montoyer in 1785–86.

During the French Revolution, the abbey was suspended and the church was made into a Temple of Reason, and then later into a Temple of Law. The church was returned to Catholic control in 1802. On 21 July 1831, Prince Leopold of Saxe-Coburg-Gotha took the oath that made him H.M. Leopold I, the first King of the Belgians, on the front steps of the church. The building lost somewhat of its typical neoclassical temple-like appearance by the addition, in the 19th century, of a dome and bell tower (after the design of the architect Tilman-François Suys), as well as a coloured fresco by the painter Jean Portaels on the pediment.

The church's interior and façade have been protected through a royal decree since 2 December 1959.

=== Statue of Godfrey of Bouillon ===
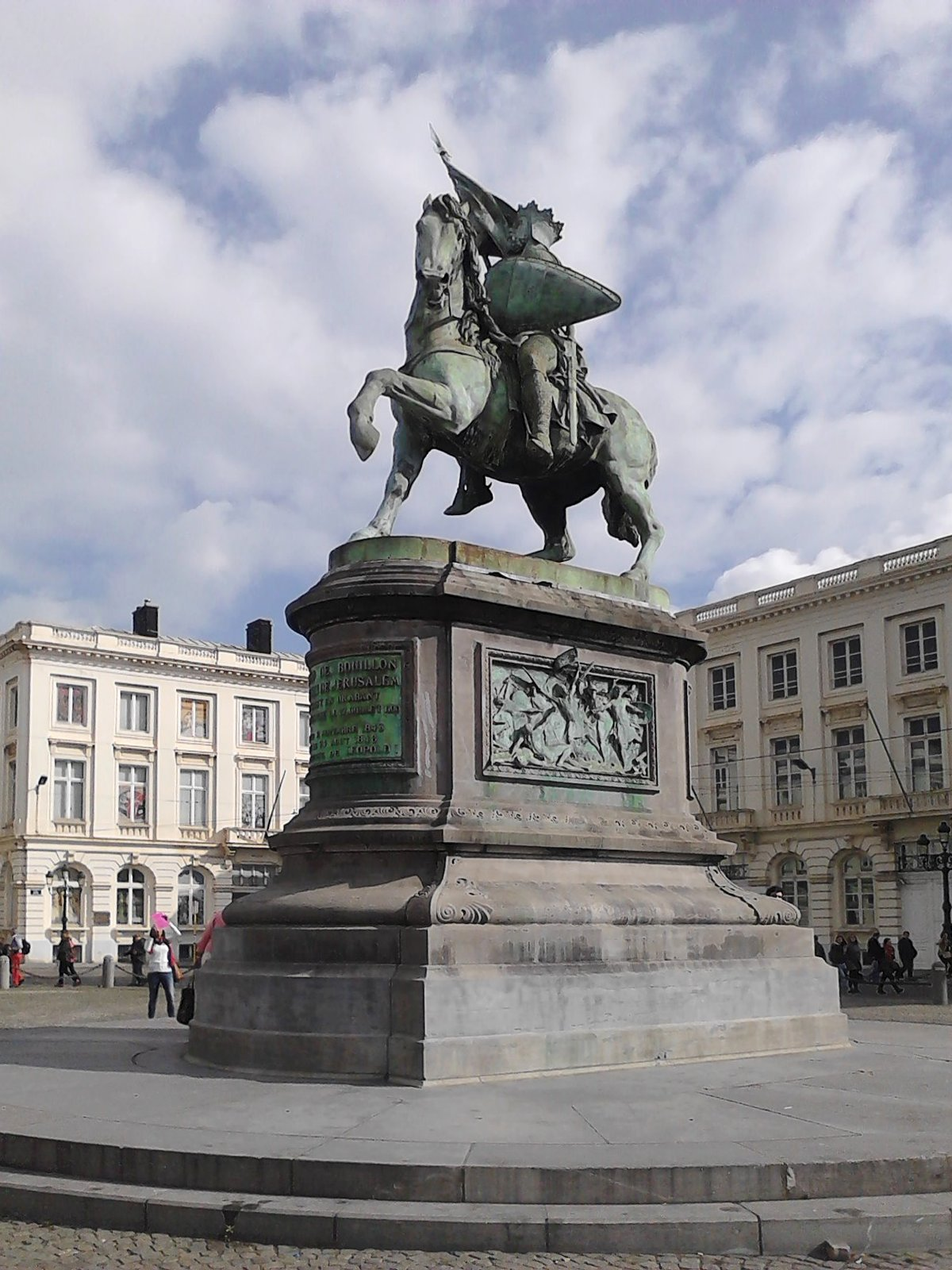
Statue of Godfrey of Bouillon (Simonis, 1848)

At the centre of the square is an equestrian statue of Godfrey of Bouillon, the leader of the first crusade in 1096. The first equestrian statue to adorn Brussels, it was sculpted by Eugène Simonis and inaugurated on 15 August 1848 to replace the statue of Charles Alexander of Lorraine by Peter Anton von Verschaffelt, which had been melted down for the value of the metal during the French rule over Brussels. A new statue of Charles Alexander of Lorraine was eventually placed nearby on the current Place du Musée/Museumplein.

The statue represents Godfrey of Bouillon as he leaves for the First Crusade; the hero waves the standard and cries Dieu le veut ! ("God wills it!"). In 1897, two bronze bas-reliefs by Guillaume de Groot were built into the statue's pedestal. One represents The Assault on Jerusalem led by Godfrey, who took the city on 15 July 1099. The other represents The Assizes of Jerusalem, a collection of laws and ordinances that were never promulgated by him.

=== Pavilions ===
The eight corner pavilions, built between 1776 and 1782, represent a remarkable Louis XVI style neoclassical ensemble. Bearing numbers from 1 to 14, they are arranged symmetrically around the square:

- the former Hôtel du Lotto (no. 1–2) was built for the Imperial and Royal Lottery of the Netherlands. Also known as the Hôtel Altenloh after the jeweller's shop that occupied the building from 1920 to 1962, it is currently home to the Magritte Museum, part of the Royal Museums of Fine Arts of Belgium.
- the former Hôtel des Brasseurs (no. 3) was built by the Corporation of Brewers. It is currently part of the Fin-de-Siècle Museum, another constituent of the Royal Museums. Also known as the Hôtel Gresham (for the wing facing the Place Royale), after the Gresham Life Assurance Society Limited that acquired it in 1900, or the Hôtel d'Argenteau (for the wing along the Rue de la Régence), it has an interesting Art Nouveau interior by the architect Léon Govaerts.
- the former Hôtel de Templeuve (no. 4), built for Countess Brigitte Scockaert de Tirimont, dowager of Templeuve, on the site of her family's former town house. It was sometimes called the Hôtel Arconati, after the name of its second owner and also the Palace of the Count of Flanders because Prince Philippe, Count of Flanders, brother of King Leopold II, had acquired it in 1866 and lived there for nearly forty years. This building has been occupied by the Court of Audit of Belgium since 1984.
- the two former Hôtels de Coudenberg (no. 5–6 and 7–8) were built by the Abbey of St. James on Coudenberg. The building to the right of St. James' Church is currently occupied by the ING Cultural Centre (formerly the BBL Cultural Centre). The building on the left is occupied by the Constitutional Court of Belgium.
- the former Hôtel Belle-Vue (no. 9) was built by Philippe de Proft to install a luxury hotel. It is currently occupied by the BELvue Museum.
- the former Hôtel de Grimbergen (no. 10) owes its name to Grimbergen Abbey, which undertook its construction. It currently belongs to the government of the Brussels-Capital Region. Under the building are the remains of the chapel of the former Coudenberg Palace.
- the former Hôtel de Spangen (no. 11–14) owes its name to the Earl of Spangen for whom it was built. The building at the corner of the square and the Rue Montagne de la Cour/Hofbergstraat (no. 13–14) is now part of the Musical Instruments Museum (MIM).
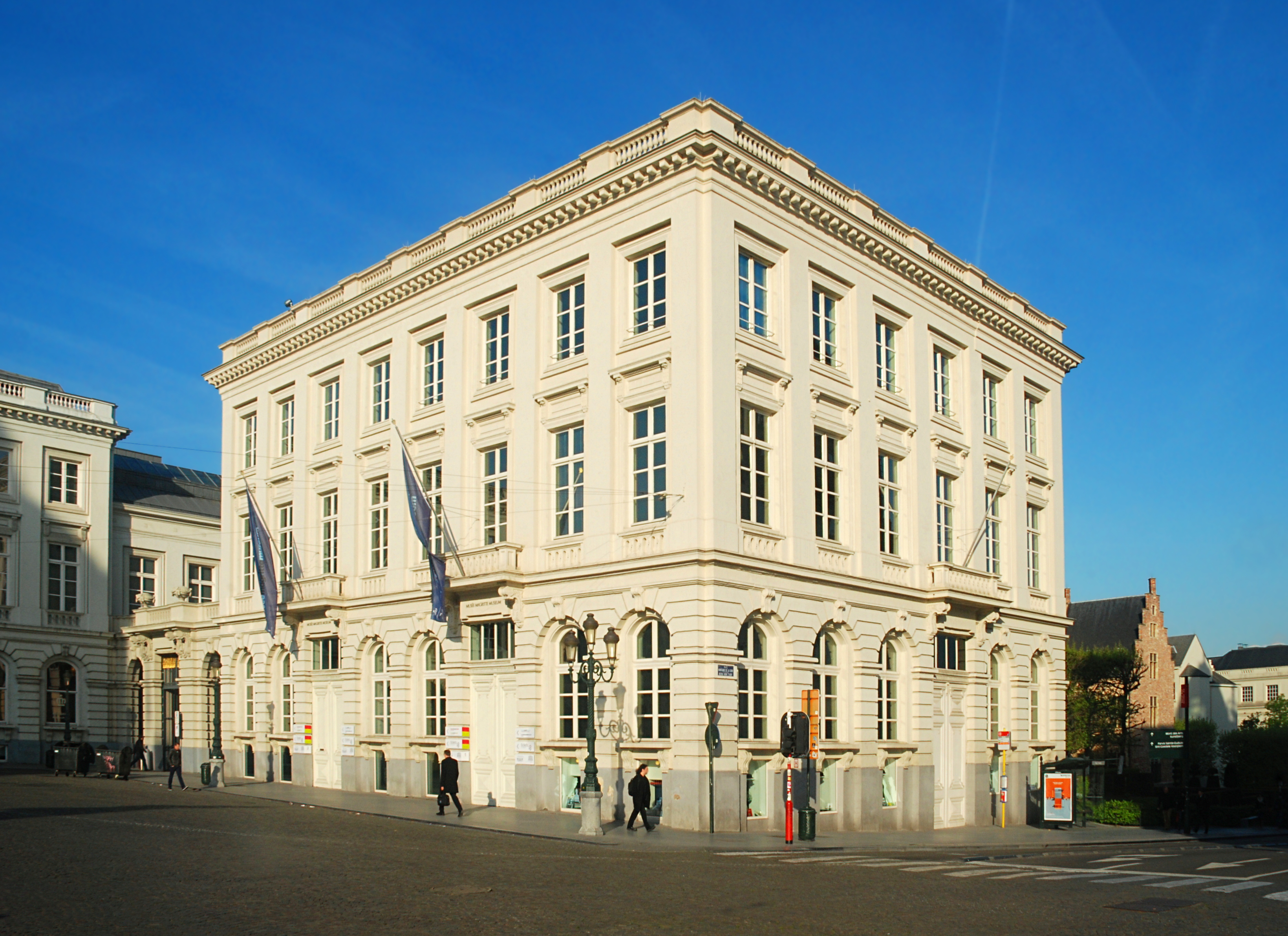
Hôtel du Lotto or Hôtel Altenloh (no. 1–2)

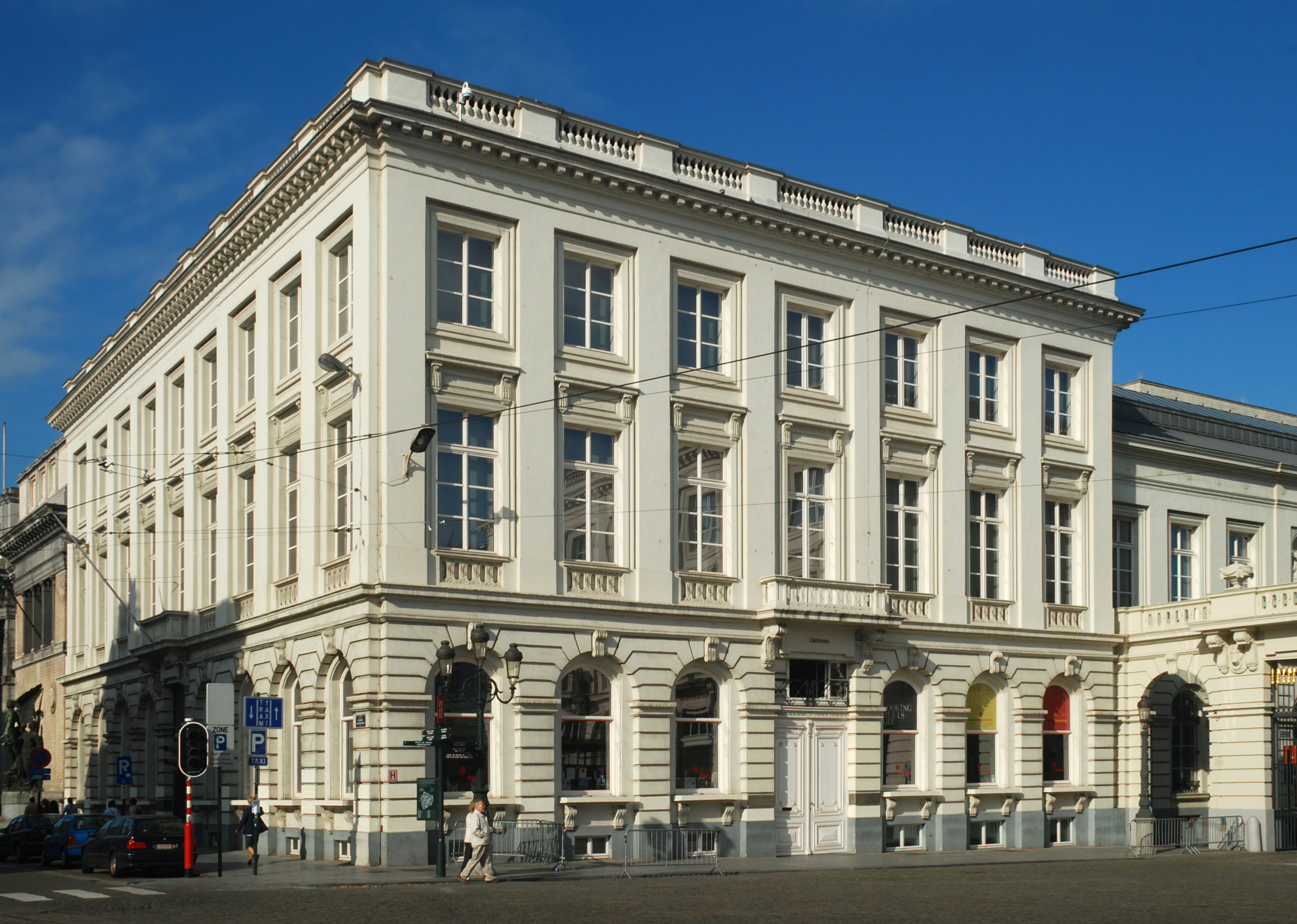
Hôtel des Brasseurs or Hôtel Gresham (no. 3)

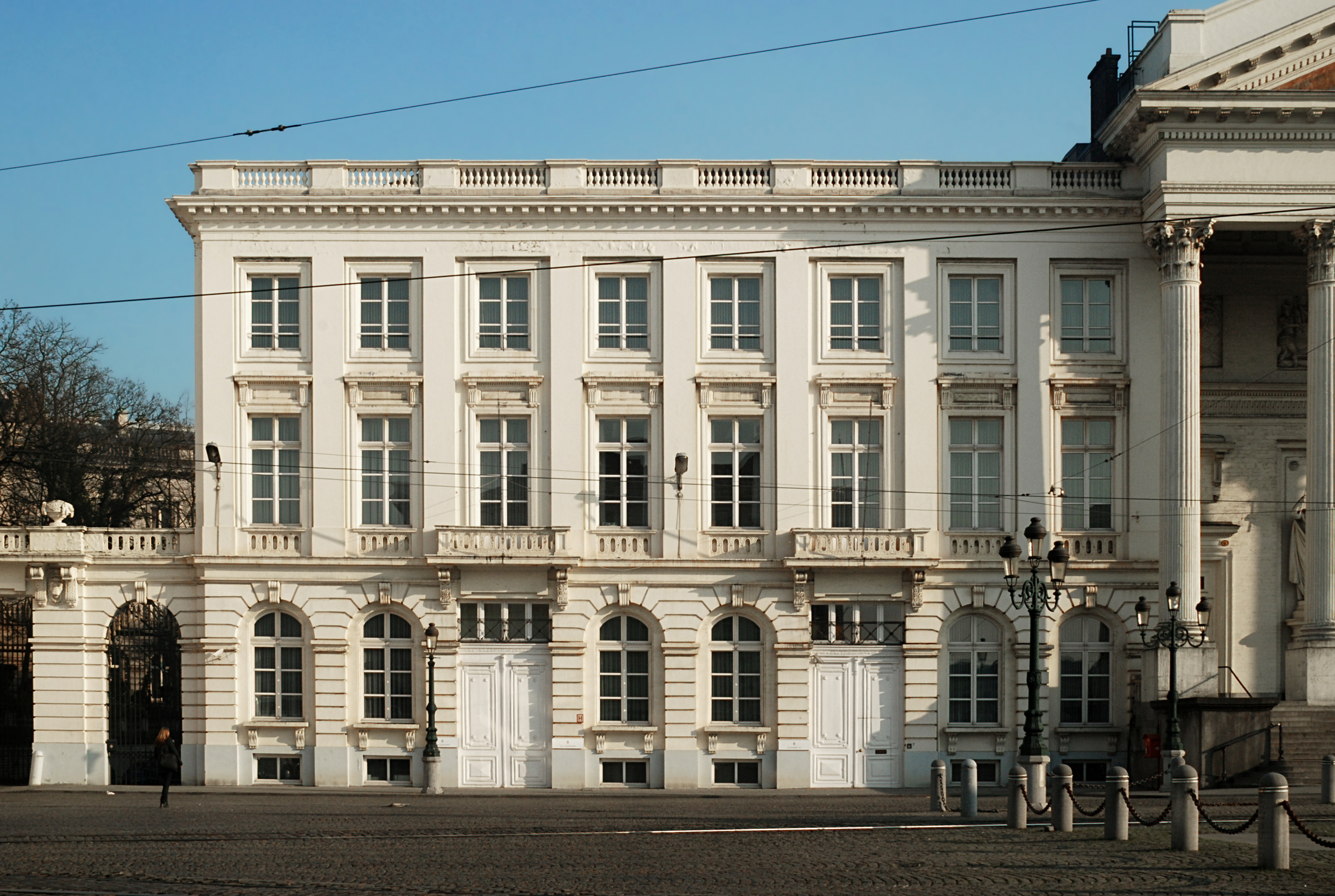
Hôtel de Coudenberg (no. 7–8)

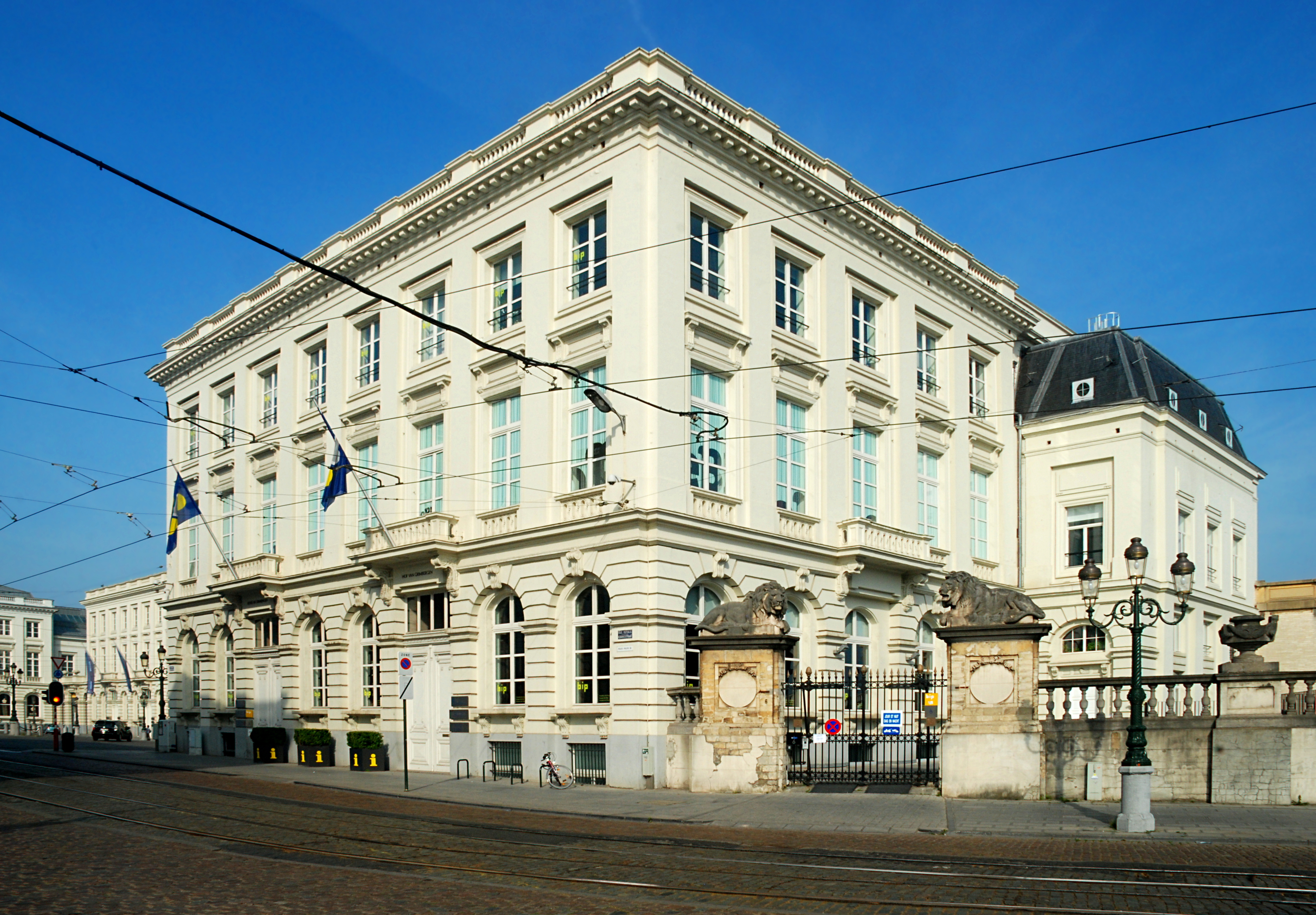
Hôtel de Grimbergen (no. 10)

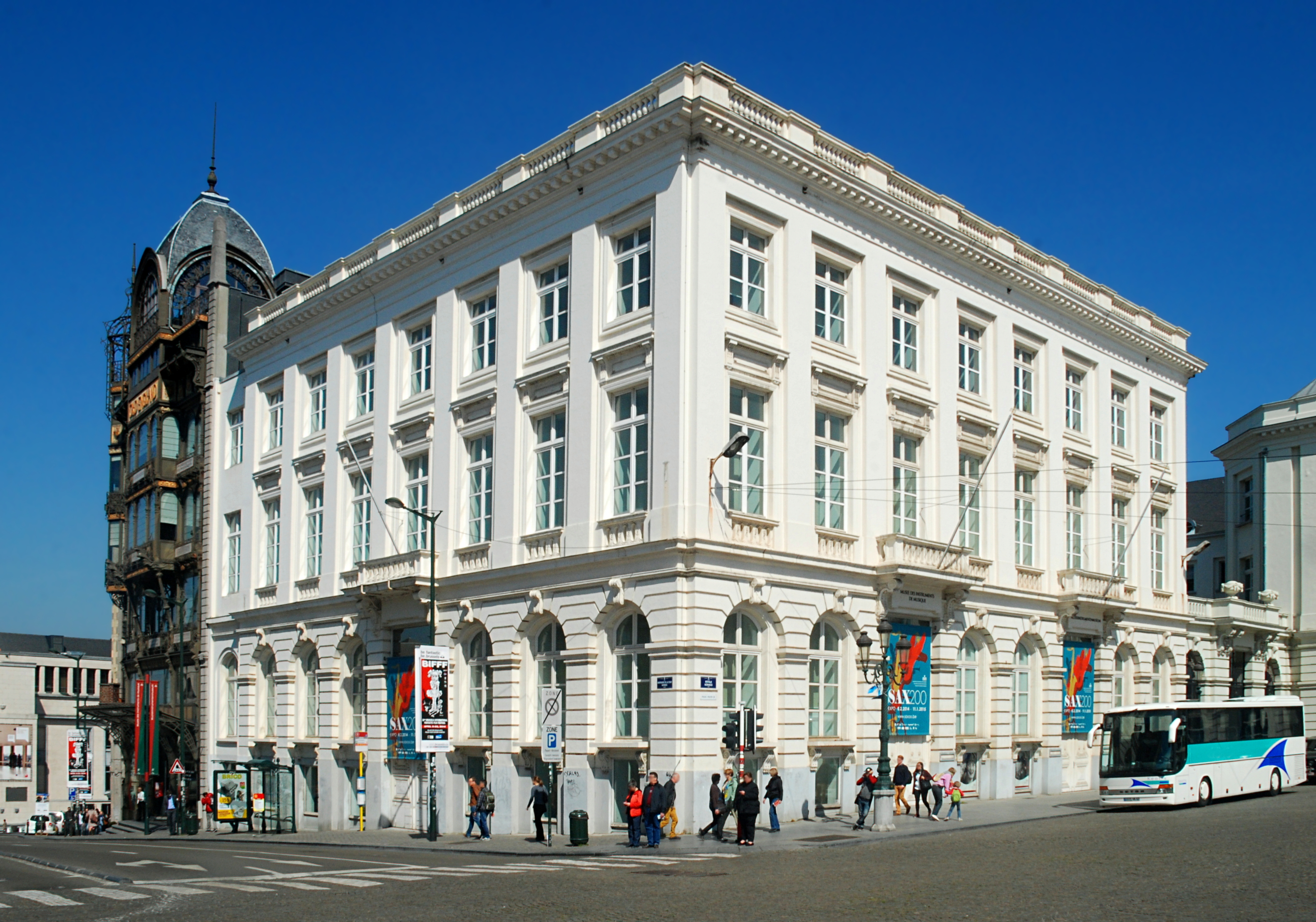
Hôtel de Spangen (no. 11–14)

=== Porticoes ===
At the corners of the square, porticoes provide a link between the pavilions towards the Impasse du Borgendael/Borgendaalgang, the Rue de Namur/Naamsestraat and the Rue du Musée/Museumstraat, the height, arrangement and decoration of which are almost identical to those of the ground floor of the pavilions.

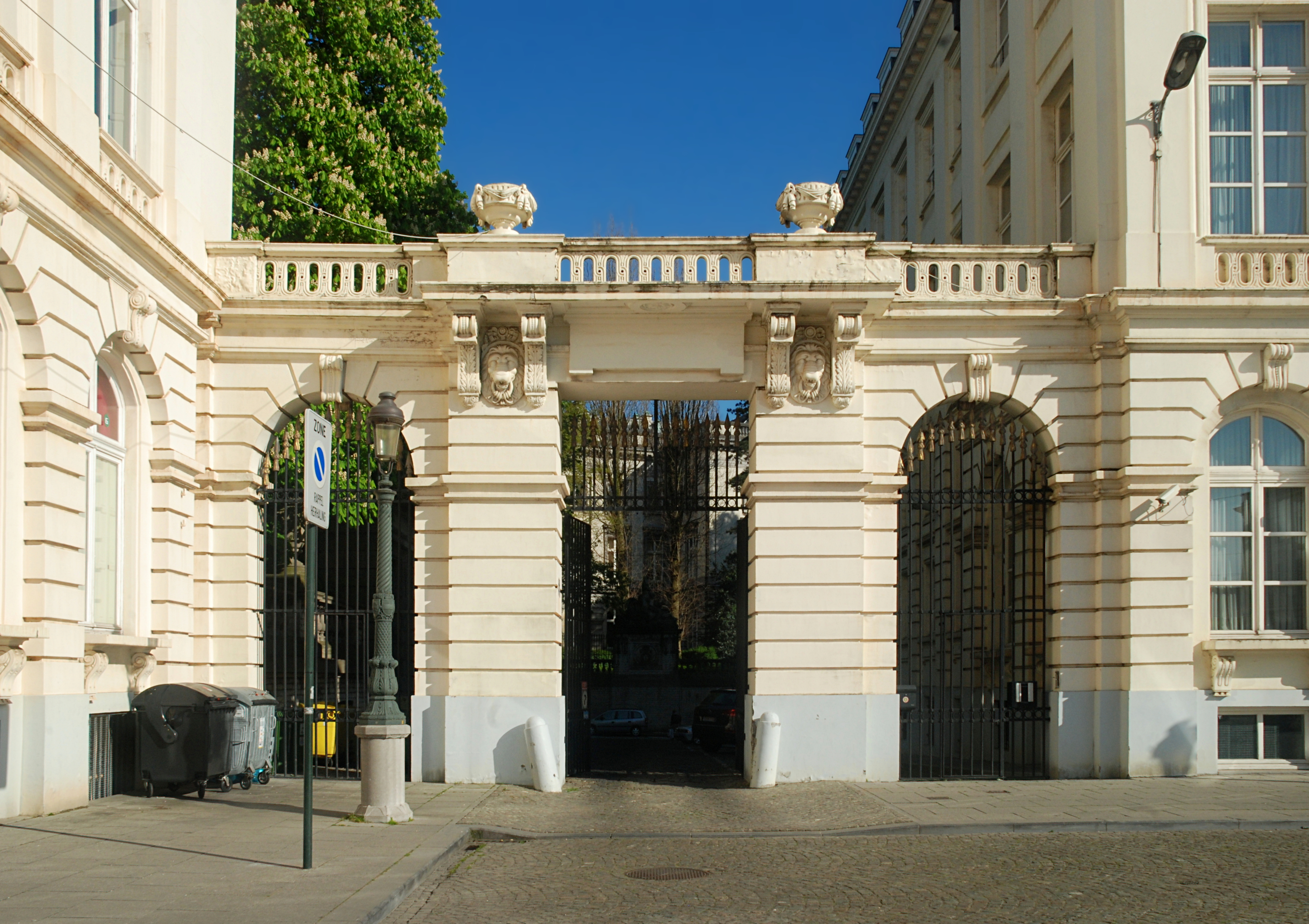
Portico of the Impasse du Borgendael/Borgendaalgang

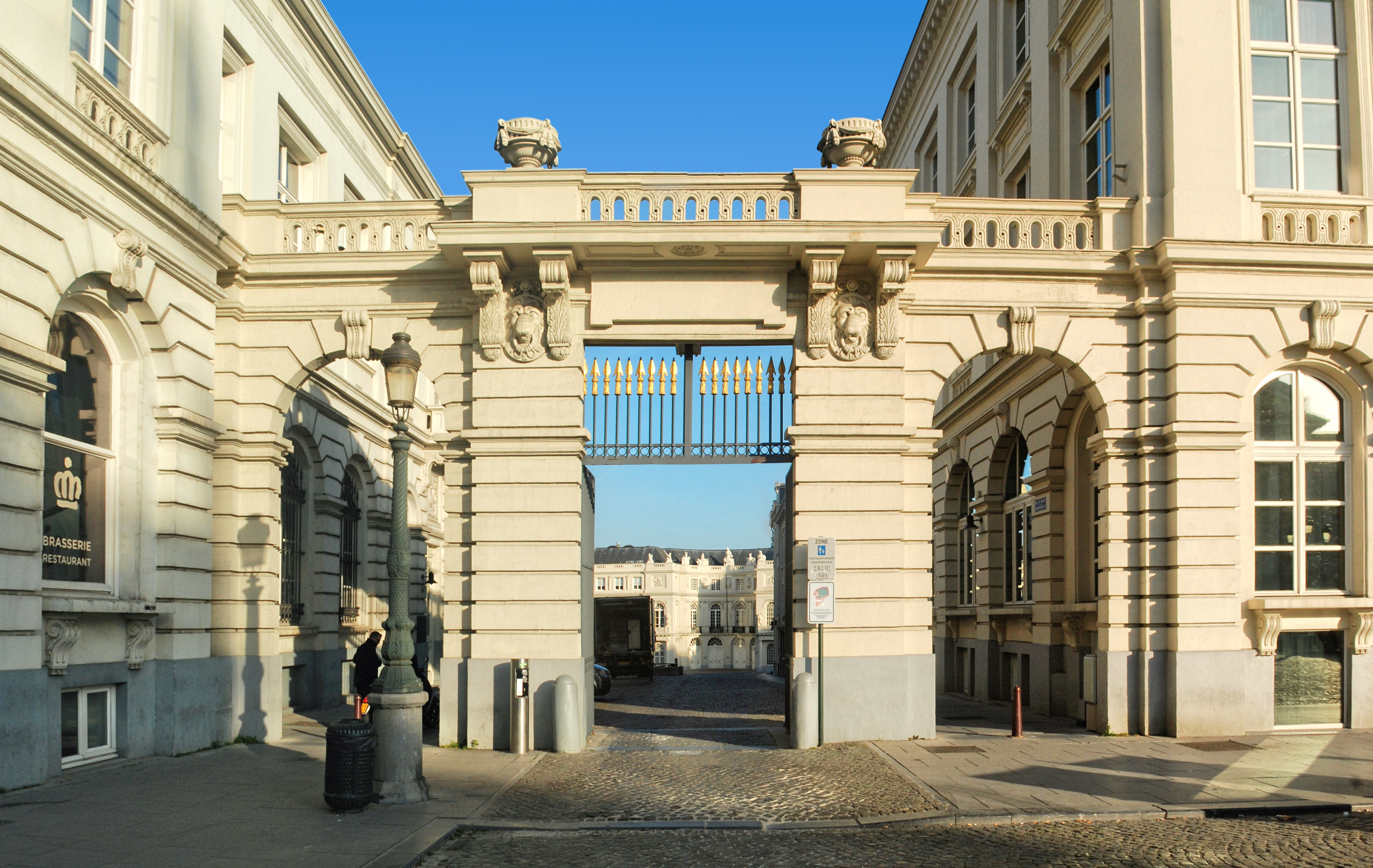
Portico of the Rue du Musée/Museumstraat

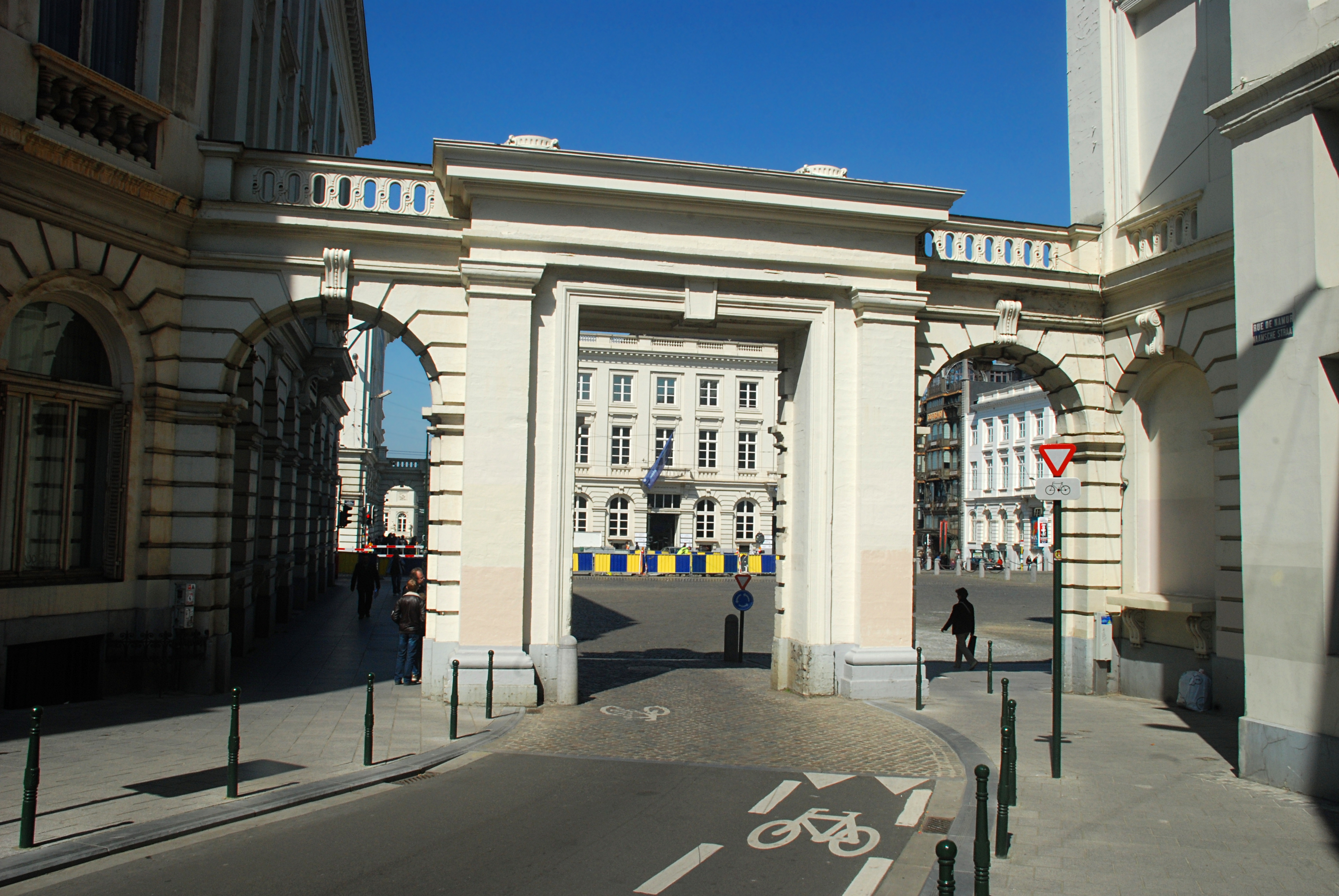
Portico of the Rue de Namur/Naamsestraat

== See also ==
- Place des Martyrs/Martelaarsplein
- Neoclassical architecture in Belgium
- History of Brussels
- Belgium in the long nineteenth century
