= Royal Quarter =

Neighbourhood in Brussels, Belgium

Royal Quarter: Quartier Royal (French); Koninklijke Wijk (Dutch)
- Neighbourhood
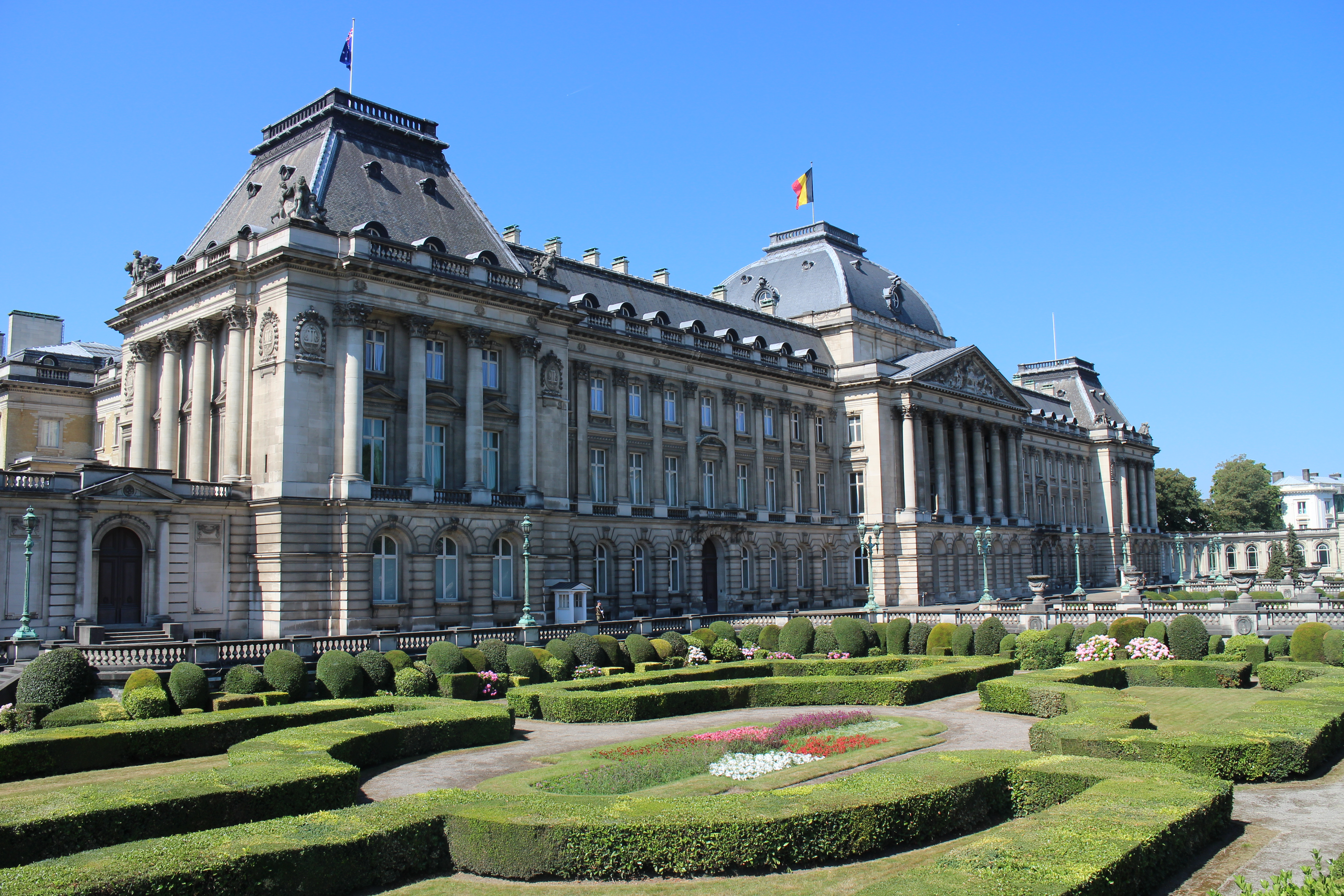
- Royal Palace of Brussels

- Location within Brussels Royal Quarter (Belgium)
- Coordinates: 50°50′40″N 4°21′48″E
- Country: Belgium
- Region: Brussels-Capital Region
- Arrondissement: Brussels-Capital
- Municipality: City of Brussels
- Time zone: UTC+1 (CET)
  - Summer (DST): UTC+2 (CEST)
- Postal code: 1000
- Area codes: 02

The Royal Quarter (French: Quartier Royal [kaʁtje ʁwajal] or Quartier de la Cour [kaʁtje də la kuʁ]; Dutch: Koninklijke Wijk [ˈkoːnɪŋkləkə ˈʋɛik] or Koningswijk [ˈkoːnɪŋsˌʋɛik]) is a quarter in the historic upper town of Brussels, Belgium. It is situated between Brussels Park, the Royal Palace, the Mont des Arts/Kunstberg and the Sablon/Zavel. It is an excellent example of 18th-century urban architecture.

== History ==
The Royal Quarter's creation began in 1774 with the construction of the Place Royale/Konigsplein at the instigation of Prince Charles Alexander of Lorraine, Governor-General of the Austrian Netherlands. The authors of the project were the French architects Jean-Benoît-Vincent Barré and Gilles-Barnabé Guimard. It was largely complete by 1783.

At the centre of the new district is Brussels Park, the main alley of which forms an axis connecting the Royal Palace and the Palace of the Council of Brabant (today's Palace of the Nation). The streets surrounding the park were built in accordance with the strict rules of neoclassical architecture.

The district marked a new stage in the history of Brussels' urban development. It was there that, for the first time in the city's history, such urban planning elements and principles as straight "perspective" streets, standard façades, and pavements were widely used. As such, it is a striking example of urban development and architecture of the Enlightenment.

== See also ==
- Neighbourhoods in Brussels
- Neoclassical architecture in Belgium
- History of Brussels
- Culture of Belgium
- Belgium in the long nineteenth century
