= Palace of the Nation =

Seat of the Belgian Federal Parliament in Brussels, Belgium

- Paleis der Natie (Dutch); Palais de la Nation (French); Palast der Nation (German)
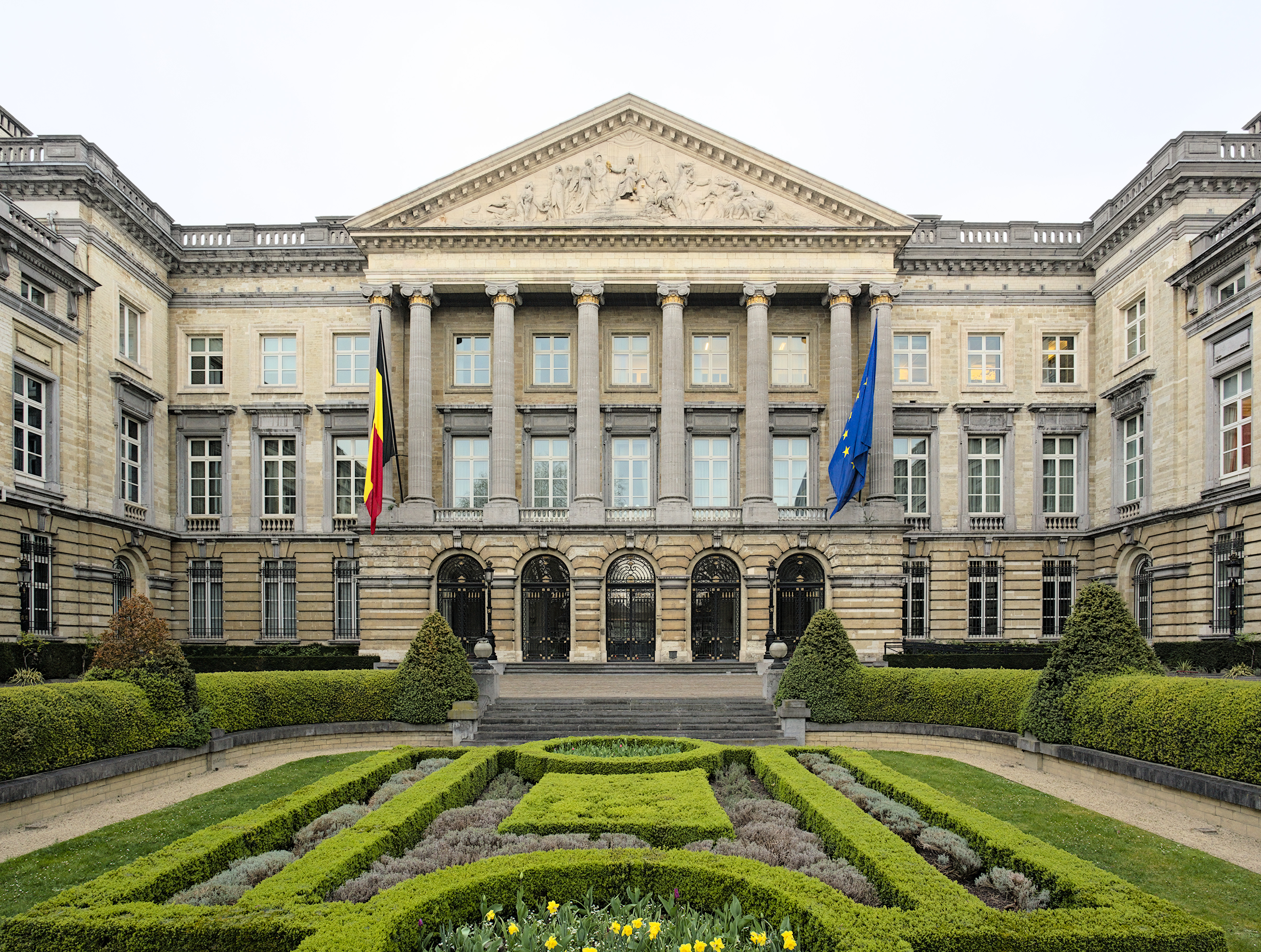
- Front view of the Palace of the Nation seen from the Rue de la Loi/Wetstraat
- Interactive map of the Palace of the Nation area
- Former names: Palace of the Council of Brabant

General information
- Architectural style: Neoclassical
- Location: Place de la Nation / Natieplein 2, 1008 City of Brussels, Brussels-Capital Region, Belgium
- Coordinates: 50°50′49″N 4°21′54″E
- Current tenants: Belgian Federal Parliament
- Construction started: 1778
- Completed: 1783

Other information
- Public transit: Brussels-Central; 1 5 Parc/Park and 1 2 5 6 Arts-Loi/Kunst-Wet

The Palace of the Nation (Dutch: Paleis der Natie; (Note: Flemish pronunciation: [paːˈlɛis dɛr ˈnaː(t)si].) French: Palais de la Nation; (Note: French pronunciation: [palɛ d(ə) la nɑsjɔ̃].) German: Palast der Nation) (Note: German pronunciation: [paˈlast deːɐ naˈtsi̯oːn].) is a neoclassical palace in Brussels, Belgium, housing the Belgian Federal Parliament. The Parliament consists of both the Chamber of Representatives (lower house) and the Senate (upper house), which convene in two separate hemicycles.

The palace was built from 1778 to 1783 to a neoclassical design by the French architect Gilles-Barnabé Guimard and includes sculptures by Gilles-Lambert Godecharle. Under Austrian rule, it housed the Sovereign Council of Brabant before being used as a courthouse during the French period. During the Dutch period, it was one of two homes of the Parliament of the United Kingdom of the Netherlands, the other being in The Hague. The palace was partially rebuilt at that time by the architect Charles Vander Straeten. Following Belgian independence in 1830, the Provisional Government of Belgium and Belgian National Congress moved into the building and the first session of the Chamber of Representatives and Senate was held there a year later.

The building stands across the street from Brussels Park's northern entrance, near the site of the former palace of the Dukes of Brabant, which was destroyed by fire in 1731, and has itself been badly damaged by fire, in 1820 and 1883. In the 1930s, a bunker was built underneath the park, connected by tunnels to the House of Parliament.

== History ==
=== Austrian Netherlands ===
The initial building, which was then called the Palace of the Council of Brabant (French: Palais du Conseil du Brabant), was built between 1778 and 1783, during the time of the Austrian Netherlands, to the plans of the French architect Gilles-Barnabé Guimard.

At the time, it consisted of three parts:

- a central part, consisting of a U-shaped building around a main courtyard (currently called the Place de la Nation/Natieplein), intended to house the Sovereign Council of Brabant, the highest court and administrative body of the Duchy of Brabant, which administered the Belgian provinces under Prince Charles Alexander of Lorraine, Governor-General of the Austrian Netherlands;
- a west wing (left wing) intended for the Chancellor;
- an east wing (right wing) intended for the Chamber of Accounts.

The pediment of the central part is decorated with a bas-relief by the sculptor Gilles-Lambert Godecharle, which represents Justice punishing Vices and rewarding Virtues.

=== United Kingdom of the Netherlands ===
The central body of the building was transformed in 1816–1818 by the architect Charles Vander Straeten to house the States General established by King William I of the Netherlands. The hemicycle built for this occasion at the rear burned down in 1820 and was rebuilt in 1821–22 by Vander Straeten.

=== Kingdom of Belgium ===
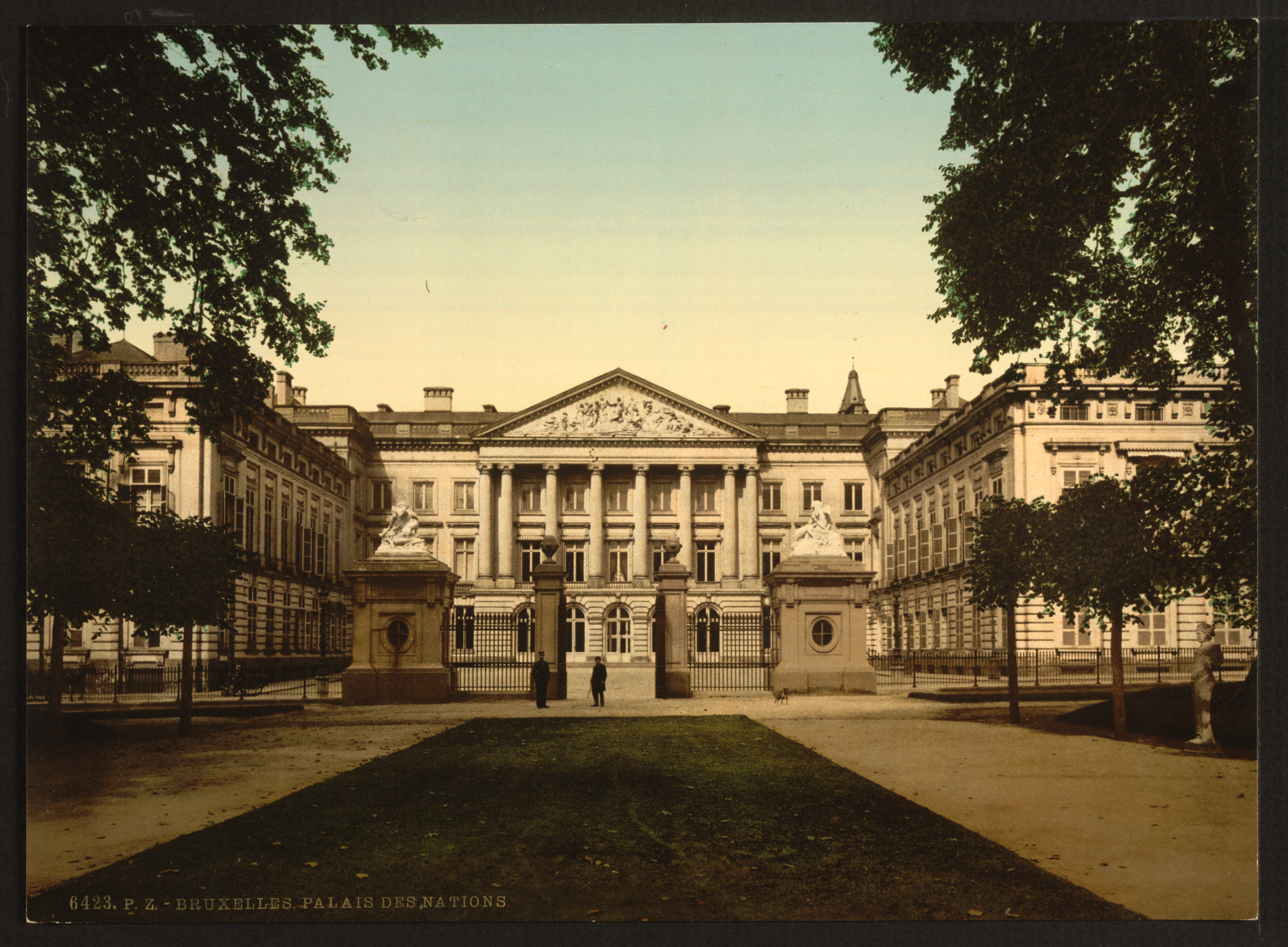
The Palace of the Nation in the late 19th century

==== The Chamber ====
In 1831, after Belgian independence, the building, merged with the palaces of the Chancellery and the Chamber of Accounts, took the name of Palace of the Nation (French: Palais de la Nation, Dutch: Paleis der Natie, German: Palast der Nation). The semicircular hall built by Vander Straeten has since housed the Chamber of Representatives.

In 1883, the Chamber was ravaged by a second fire and it took the architect Henri Beyaert three years, until 1886, to rebuild it.

==== The Senate ====
In 1847–1849, a second hemicycle was built by the architect Tilman-François Suys to house the Senate. It was enlarged in 1902–03 by Gédéon Bordiau.

== Gallery ==
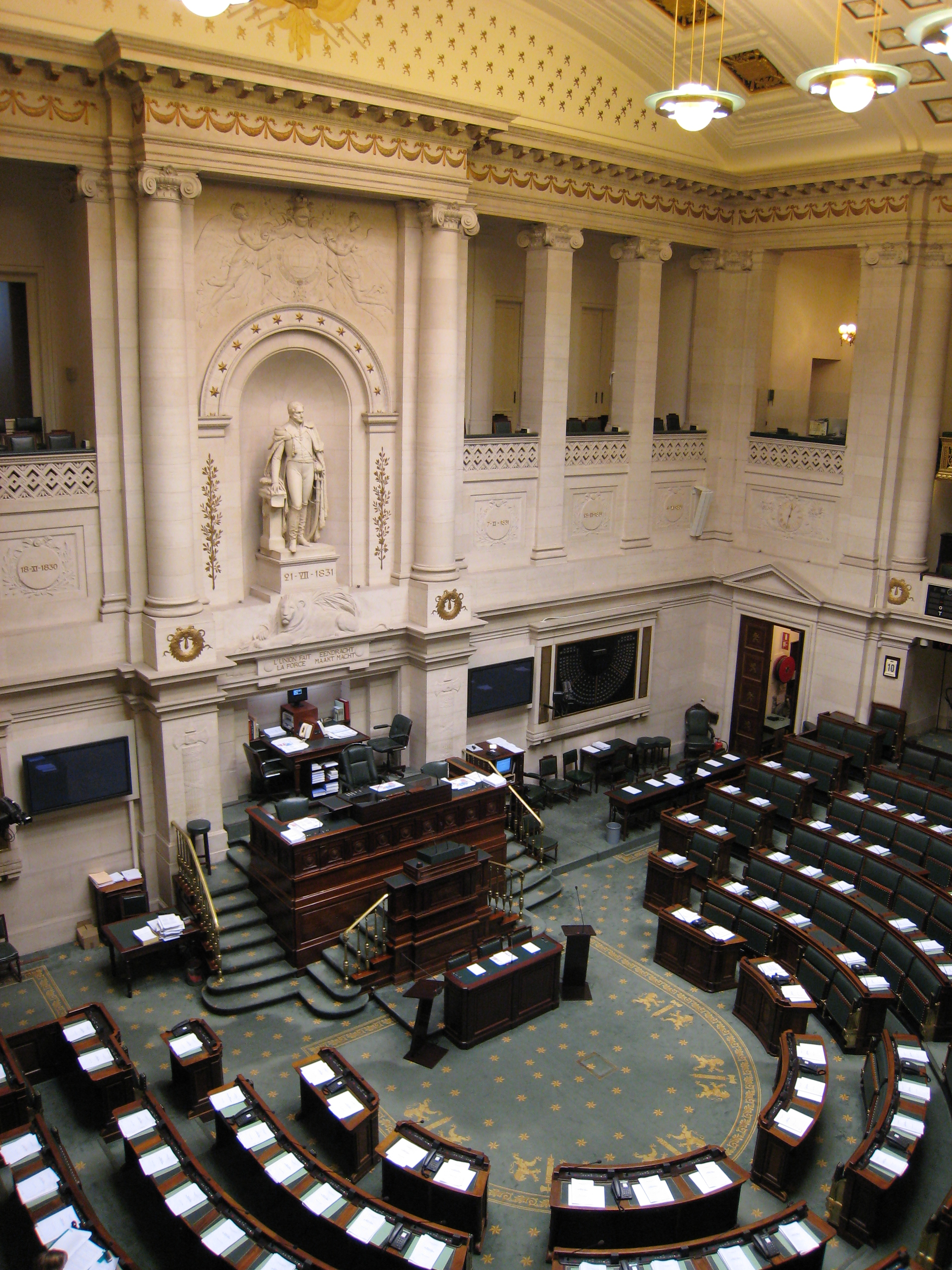
Chamber hemicycle

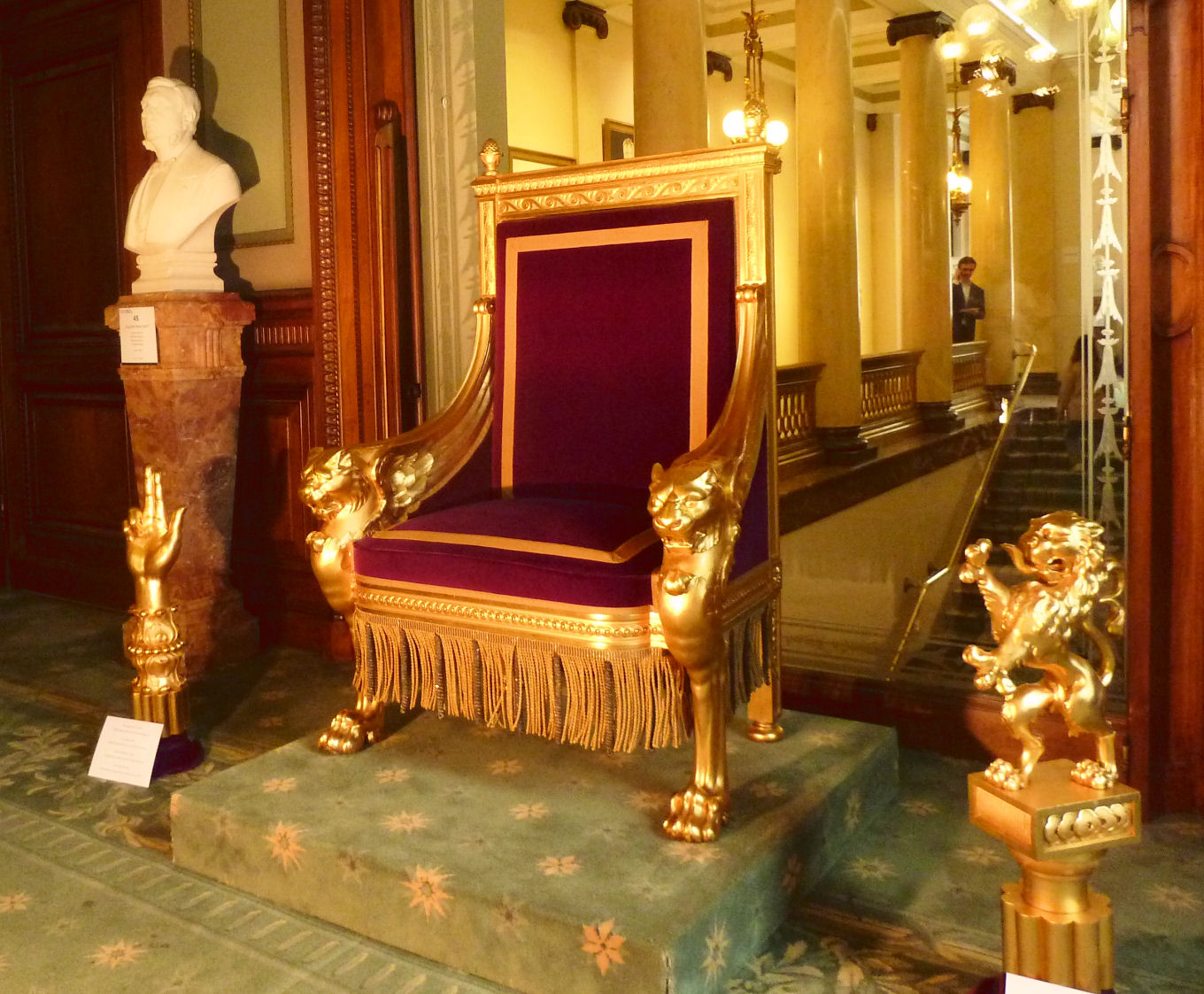
Throne of the King of the Belgians, Chamber

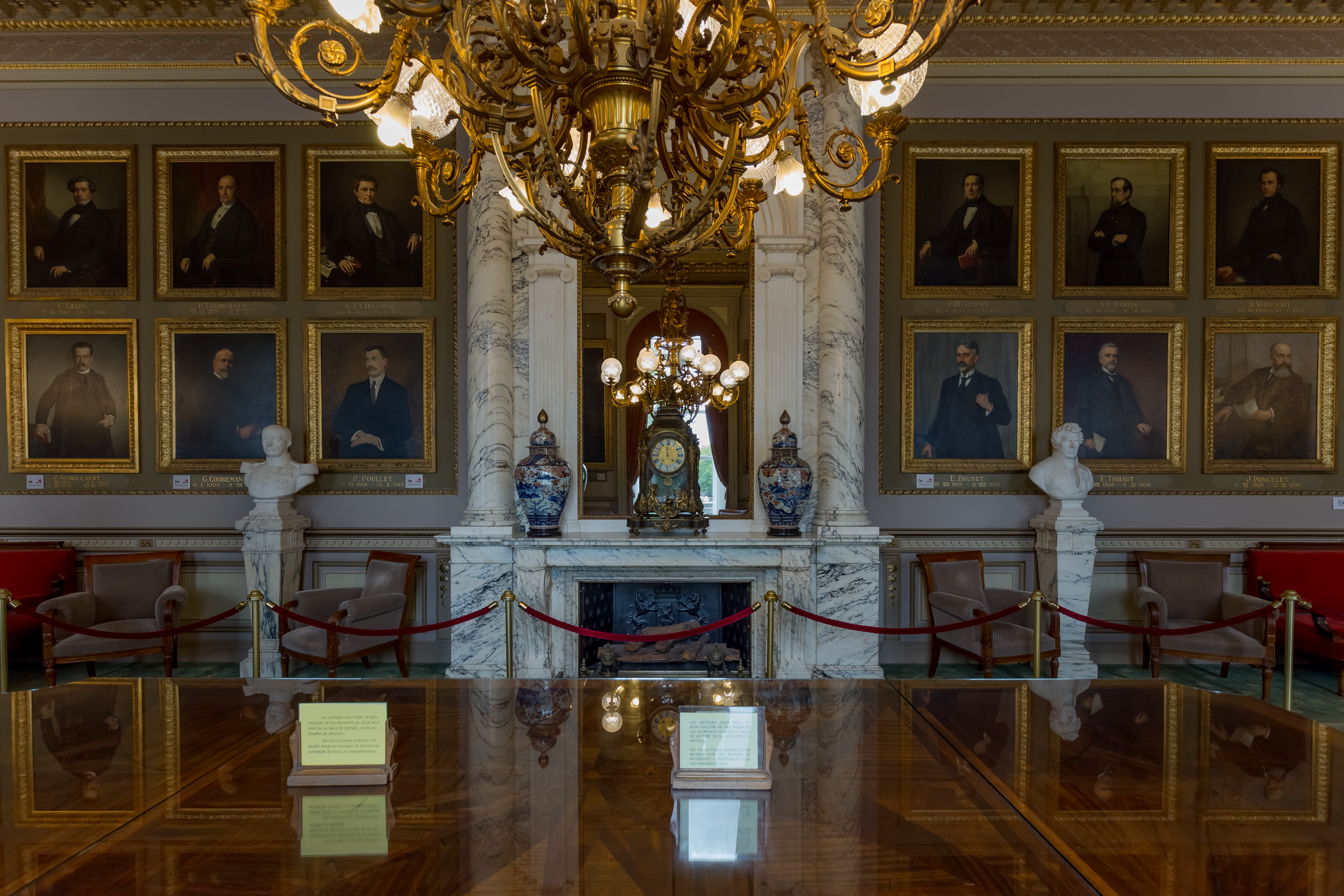
Reading Room, Chamber

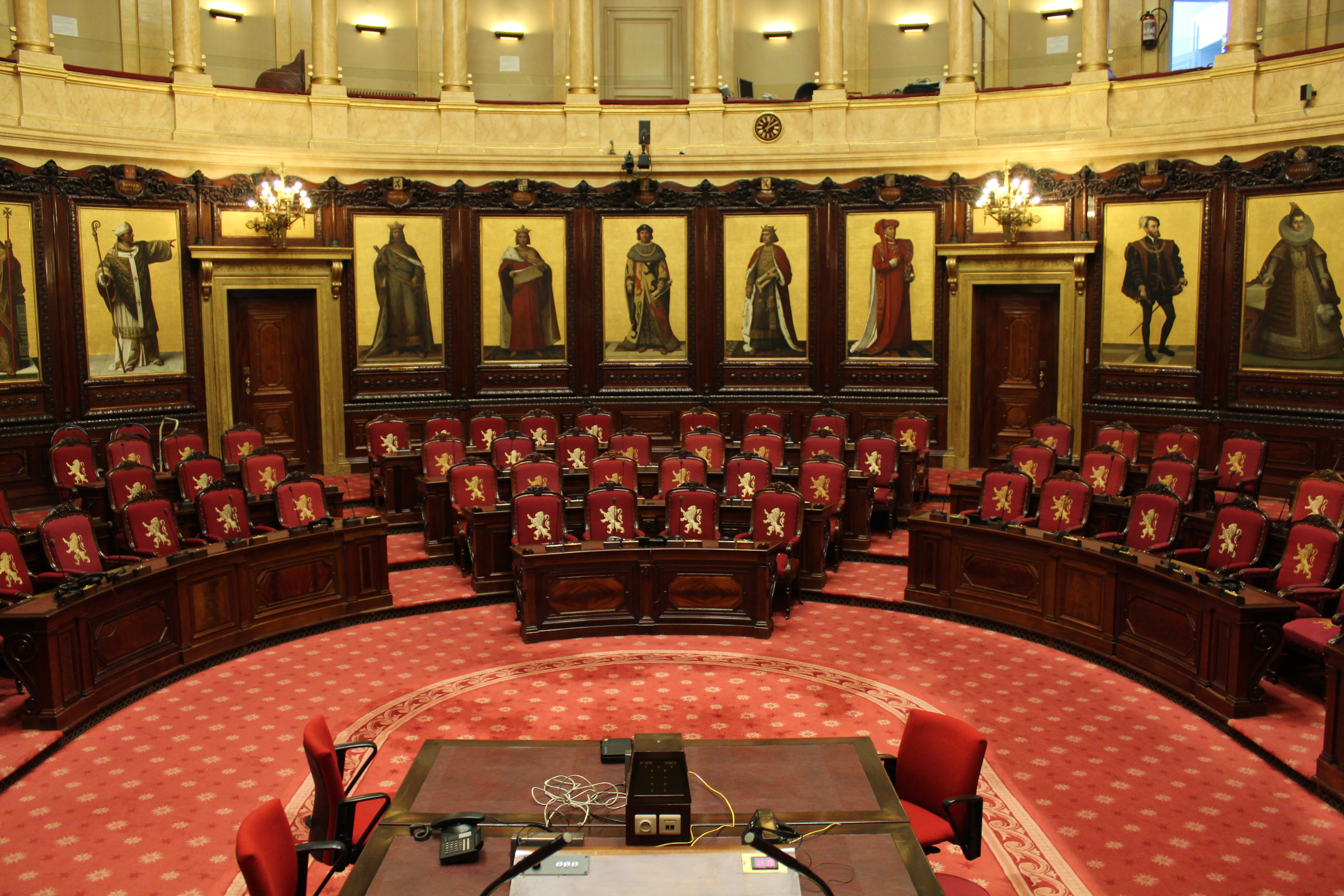
Senate hemicycle

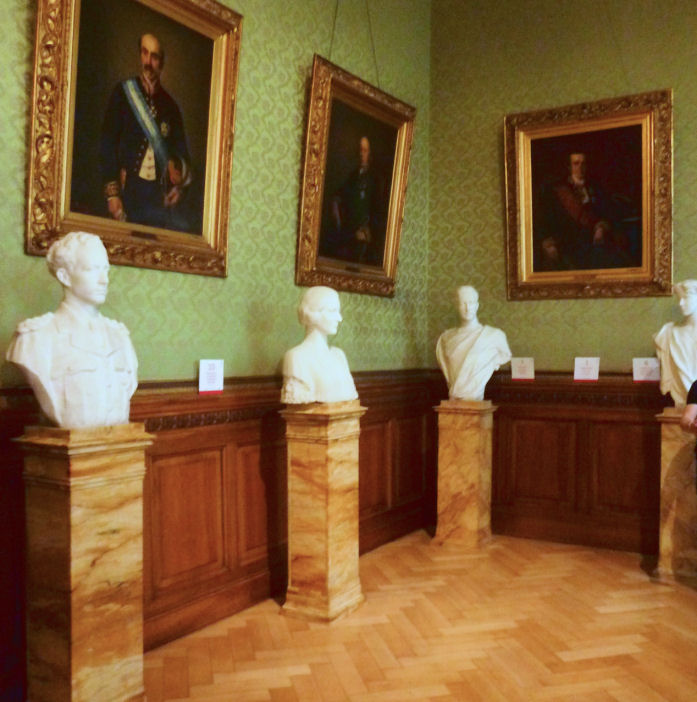
Green Salon, Senate

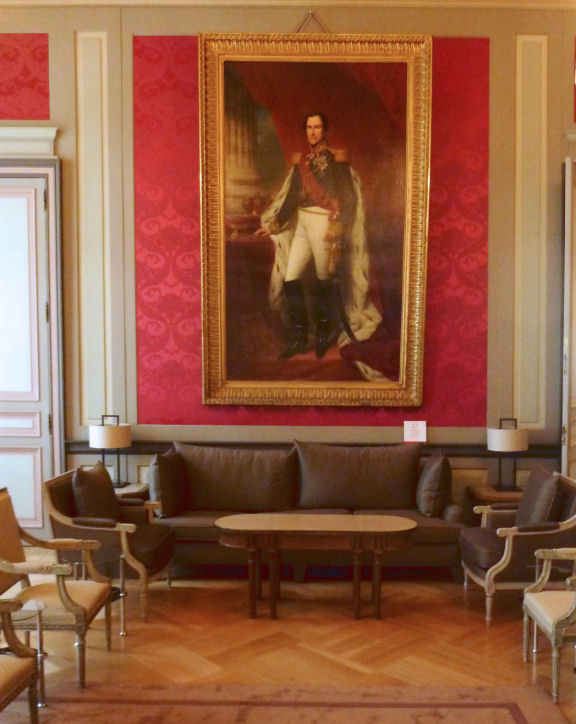
Red Salon, Senate

== See also ==
- Neoclassical architecture in Belgium
- History of Brussels
- Belgium in the long nineteenth century
