= Barnabé Guimard =

18th-century French architect

Gilles-Barnabé Guimard
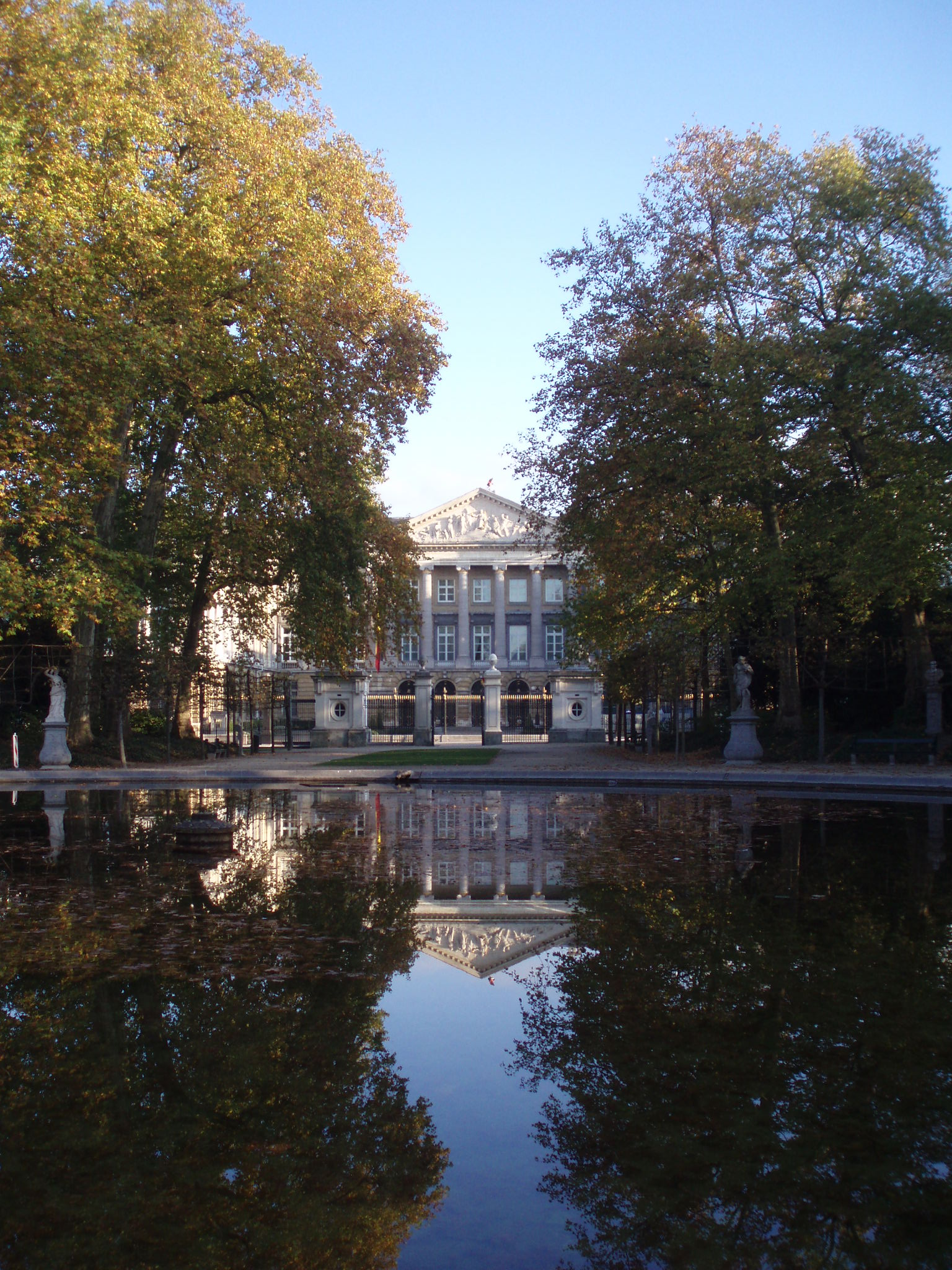
- Born: 1734; Amboise, France
- Died: 21 September 1805 (aged 70–71); Mosnes, France
- Occupation: Architect
- Buildings: Palace of the Council of Brabant in Brussels (now the Belgian Parliament)
- Projects: Place Royale/Koningsplein in Brussels; Brussels Park

Gilles-Barnabé Guimard (French pronunciation: [ʒil baʁnabe ɡimaʁ]; also Gilles Barnabé Guymard de Larabe or Barnabé Guimard; 1734 – 1805) was a French architect.

He spent his entire career in the Habsburg Netherlands (present-day Belgium) where he led important architectural and urbanistic projects such as the Place Royale/Koningsplein and the Palace of the Council of Brabant, which today houses the Belgian Federal Parliament, both in the City of Brussels.

== Life and work ==
Guimard was trained at the prestigious Académie royale d'architecture in Paris. There he participated at the Concours de fin d'année twice: the first time in 1759 with a design for an equestrian school, a second time in 1760 under the patronage of Jacques-François Blondel with a design for a parish church.

From August 1761, Guimard's name can be found in the records of the Brussels court of Prince Charles Alexander of Lorraine where he worked under direction of court architect J. Faulte. In 1765, he left Faulte's studio, probably because the latter used his designs and ideas without acknowledging his patron. His talent was then recognised by the influential Count Cobenzl who also admired his knowledge of antique architecture and culture. After being introduced to the chancellor of the Habsburg Netherlands, Wenzel Anton, Prince of Kaunitz-Rietberg, he received his first official commissions; a catafalque for the funeral of Emperor Franz I in the Church of St. Michael and St. Gudula (now Brussels' cathedral) and a public fountain in the form of an obelisk near the Church of Our Lady of the Chapel (the latter monument has recently been reconstructed near the Chapel Church after the original designs).

In 1766, Guimard was installed as professor of architecture at the newly founded architecture section at the Brussels 'Academie'. He soon resigned this post to work full-time at new commissions in Brussels and Antwerp. For years he tried in vain to be appointed to an official function at the court. Instead of Guimard, it was the slightly older Walloon architect Laurent-Benoît Dewez who succeeded Faulte as official court architect. Guimard continued to work 'freelance' for the state and the court during several years, without receiving the benefits of an official function.

In 1768, Charles Alexander of Lorraine asked him to make the plans for the levelling of the former site of the Coudenberg Palace which had been destroyed by fire in 1731. This area would eventually become the new centre of government in Brussels, with realisations such as Brussels Park, the Place Royale/Koningsplein and the Palace of the Council of Brabant. From 1770 onwards he mainly worked at the different plans for this new 'Royal Quarter'. For this task he had to collaborate with other architects that were consulted by the government such as Jean-Benoît-Vincent Barré for the designs of the Place Royale or the Austrian landscape architect Joachim Zinner for the lay-out of Brussels Park. The design of the Place Royale has long been attributed to Guimard. In fact Guimard had the task to supervise the works in Brussels, carried out after the plans that Barré had sent from Paris. Still Guimard had an important input, as it was his task to adapt the plans to the local situation and to overcome unforeseen practical difficulties.

In 1773, Guimard made a project design for a new state prison that the government planned in Vilvoorde near Brussels. His project is close to contemporary French designs of this kind. At the end, he did not get the commission and the building was eventually carried out after the project of court architect Laurent-Benoît Dewez.

Guimard was involved in the design and execution of numerous mansions erected in a uniform style around Brussels Park such as the Hotel Errera. His most important personal realisation within the project of the Royal Quarter were the designs of the Palace of the Council of Brabant. In the early 1780s, the government entrusted him with the design for the monumental gateways of Brussels Park. This commission was executed in collaboration with the sculptor Gilles-Lambert Godecharle who also made the designs for the relief decorating the pediment of the Palace of the Council of Brabant. After the death of Charles Alexander of Lorraine the government of the Habsburg Netherlands was entrusted to Archduchess Maria Christina of Austria and her husband Albert of Saxe-Teschen. As also Dewez had fallen into disfavour - officially due to shortcomings in his designs for the Vilvoorde prison - they choose for new architects to work in their service such as Charles de Wailly and Louis Montoyer. Ironically the last official commission that Guimard received was a triumphal arch erected in Brussels at the occasion of the Triumphant Entry of the new Governors into their Capital (1781).

In the last years under Austrian rule, Guimard designed his most important private commission; the Château of Wannegem-Lede. It is a small but elegant country house on the top of a hill in a Romantic English garden. It is a fine neoclassical design, strongly reminiscent to Ange-Jacques Gabriel's Petit Trianon. After the occupation of the Habsburg Netherlands by the French revolutionary troops Guimard returned to his country of origin where he was named professor of the Ecole Centrale in Tours in 1796.
