= Gourmet =

Cultural ideal associated with the culinary arts of fine food and drink

Gourmet (US: /ɡɔːrˈmeɪ/, UK: /ˈɡɔːrmeɪ/) is a cultural idea associated with the culinary arts of fine food and drink, or haute cuisine, which is characterized by their high level of refined and elaborate food preparation techniques and displays of balanced meals that have an aesthetically pleasing presentation of several contrasting, often quite rich courses. Historically the ingredients used in the meal tended to be rare for the region, which could also be impacted by the local state and religious customs. The term and the related characteristics are typically used to describe people with more discerning palates and enthusiasm. Gourmet food is more frequently provided with small servings and in more upscale and posh fine dining establishments that cater to a more affluent and exclusive client base. When it comes to cooking gourmet dishes, there are also frequent cross-cultural interactions that introduce new, exotic, and expensive ingredients, materials, and traditions with more refined, complex, formal, and sophisticated high-level cooking and food preparation techniques.

== Origin of term ==
The word gourmet is from the French term for a wine broker or taste-vin employed by a wine dealer. Friand was formerly the reputable name for a connoisseur of delicious things that were not eaten primarily for nourishment: "A good gourmet", wrote the conservative eighteenth-century Dictionnaire de Trévoux, employing this original sense, "must have le goût friand", or a refined palate. The pleasure is also visual: "J'aime un ragoût, et je suis friand", Giacomo Casanova declared, "mais s'il n'a pas bonne mine, il me semble mauvais". In the eighteenth century, gourmet and gourmand carried disreputable connotations of gluttony, which only gourmand has retained. Gourmet was rendered respectable by Monsieur Grimod de la Reynière, whose Almanach des Gourmands, essentially the first restaurant guide, appeared in Paris from 1803 to 1812. Previously, even the liberal Encyclopédie offered a moralising tone in its entry Gourmandise, defined as "refined and uncontrolled love of good food", employing reproving illustrations that contrasted the frugal ancient Spartans and Roman Republic with the decadent luxury of Sybaris. The Jesuits' Dictionnaire de Trévoux took the Encyclopédistes to task, reminding its readers that gourmandise was one of the Seven Deadly Sins.

== Associated terms ==
The term gourmet can refer to a person with refined or discriminating taste who is knowledgeable in the craft and art of food and food preparation.

Gourmand carries additional connotations of one who enjoys food in great quantities.

An epicure is similar to a gourmet, but the word may sometimes carry overtones of excessive refinement.

A gourmet chef is used to refer to a chef with a particularly high caliber of cooking talent and culinary skill.

== Regional differences ==
What is considered gourmet is different depending on the time and geographic region. What is gourmet historically depended upon what ingredients the people of that region had access to and how easily they acquire them. For instance, seafood could be considered a luxury in an area that lacks fish, whereas it would not be seen as such in an area near the ocean or a great river. Gourmet tended, and still does in many parts of the world, to be revered by a person with access to wealth because gourmet food has always been expensive. The expense was the result of a scarcity of ingredients for a particular food in the region at the time. This fact meant they needed to be brought in from far away, which brought a variety of risks to the merchants. Merchants would have to deal with weather conditions, thieves, and broken equipment, intermediaries, and other such factors that could delay or interrupt the shipment of the good at the cost of their lives and fortune. Thus they asked for higher prices. For millennia, about 10% of the population could eat food that may have been considered gourmet in their time. Potentially 80% of the global population worked in food production and would have eaten more typical meals to survive. The typical meal would be what they could most easily get their hands on. In Britain, for instance, that was gruels, vegetables, small amounts of wild game, and grains.

== Cultural exchange ==
This trading from non-local regions, also means, almost by necessity, that there was much cultural exchange between different groups to get these goods. The Columbian Exchange introduced many ingredients and styles to the new world and Europe starting with the expansion of the Iberian Empires. The new world introduced to Europeans tomatoes, potatoes, chocolate, and much more. Another example would be interactions with the Islamic world, which impacted Catholic cuisine in the 1100s. These interactions introduced many spices, the theory of the culinary cosmos, and cooking items such as North African pottery. These trades were facilitated by rich merchant states that traded with them, the most notable being Venice.

== Food ==
Gourmet may describe a class of restaurant, cuisine, meal or ingredient of high quality, of special presentation, or high sophistication. In the United States, a 1980s gourmet food movement evolved from a long-term division between elitist (or "gourmet") tastes and a populist aversion to fancy foods. Gourmet is an industry classification for high-quality premium foods in the United States. In the 2000s, there has been an accelerating increase in the American gourmet market, due in part to rising income, globalization of taste, and health and nutrition concerns. Individual food and beverage categories, such as coffee, are often divided between a standard and a "gourmet" sub-market.

== Gourmet pursuits ==
Certain events such as wine tastings cater to people who consider themselves gourmets and foodies. Television programs (such as those on the Food Network) and publications such as Gourmet magazine often serve gourmets with food columns and features. Gourmet tourism is a niche industry catering to people who travel to food or wine tastings, restaurants, or food and wine production regions for leisure.

== Related concepts ==
Foodie is often used by the media as a conversational synonym for gourmet, although it is a different concept (distinct from that of a food aficionado or food enthusiast). The word foodie was coined synchronously by Gael Greene in the magazine New York and by Paul Levy and Ann Barr, co-authors of The Official Foodie Handbook (1984).

== See also ==
- Delicatessen
- Fooding – a restaurant guide
- Gastronomy
- Les Marmitons
- Michelin Guide – a restaurant guide
- Specialty foods
- Sumito Estévez
