= Néo-physiologie du goût par ordre alphabétique =

Title page of first edition, 1839

Néo-physiologie du goût par ordre alphabétique, ou, Dictionnaire général de la cuisine francaise, ancient et moderne, ainsi que de l'office et de la pharmacie domestique (Neo-physiology of taste in alphabetical order, or, General Dictionary of French Cuisine, Ancient and Modern, as well as of the Office and Domestic Pharmacy) is a culinary reference book, published in Paris in 1839.

== Title ==
The title is drawn from Physiologie du goût (The Physiology of Taste) by Jean Anthelme Brillat-Savarin, published in 1825; it prompted a spate of "physiologies" from French writers, including Balzac's The Physiology of Marriage in 1829, and works by less famous writers on "the physiology of the opera", "the physiology of the café", and the physiologies of the umbrella, billiards, and the ridiculous.

== Authorship ==
According to the preface, the book is a collaboration between three contributors:

a lady of high society who has no children, who is no longer young, and who has not very much with which to occupy herself; secondly, her doctor, one of the cleverest of German medical men, who wishes, from philanthropic motives, to offer a system of hygiene suitable for French cookery; thirdly, her cook, not the least intelligent of the three, who is tormented by the desire to speak the truth about the science of his profession. (Note: "Premièrement, une femme de bonne compagnie, qui n'a pas d'enfants, qui n'est plus jeune et qui n’a pas grand chose à faire; deuxièmement, son Docteur, qui est un des plus habiles médecins germaniques, et qui voudrait faire concorder le système hygiénique avec la cuisine française, par philanthropie; troisièmement, son cuisinier, qui n'est pas le moins habile des trois, qui est tourmenté par le besoin de dire la vérité sur la science qu'il professe"..)

The preface states that the work includes a few recipes from unpublished papers of Grimod de La Reynière.

The bibliographer Joseph-Marie Quérard contends that the book was in fact written by Maurice Cousin, comte de Courchamps, a celebrated gourmet. The title page of the book carries a dedication to "the author of the Memoirs of the Marquise de Créquy", who according to Quérard (and the Bibliothèque nationale de France), was Courchamps himself.

== Content ==
According to the author or authors the book is:

a work in which one will find all the prescriptions necessary for the preparation of nutritious or ornamental foods for the use of the richest and poorest; a publication which should make up for all the cookery books with whose charlatanism, inadequacy and obscurity the public is only too familiar: enriched with several menus, culinary prescriptions, and other unpublished pamphlets by M. de la Reynière ... followed by a general collection of French menus since the twelfth century, and concluded by a pharmacopoeia.

The first and largest section of the book is an A to Z of culinary terms from Abaisse (thinly-rolled pastry) to Zuchetti (Italian ragout of mushrooms and courgettes). Most of the terms are French, but foreign dishes are mentioned, including English dumplings, Spanish-style lettuce, Italian ravioli and Welch Rabbit

Menu for a dinner given by Talleyrand for Alexander I of Russia

The second section gives details of grand dinners from the fifteenth century onwards, including a banquet for Louis XIV in 1666:

- First course
  - Eight pots of soup and sixteen hot hors d'oeuvres
- Second course
  - Eight large relevés of soups and sixteen entrées of fine meats
- Third course
  - Eight roast dishes and sixteen vegetable dishes served with meat coulis
- Fourth course
  - Eight pâtés or cold meats and fish, and sixteen pancakes in oil, cream or butter
- Fifth and last couse
  - Twenty-four miscellaneous pastries
  - Twenty-four bowls of fruit
  - Twenty-four plates of sweets.

A menu for a dinner given by Talleyrand for Alexander I of Russia lists sixteen courses comprising fifty-two dishes.

The third and last section, Recueil des recettes médicales, is a collection of medical recipes, including tisanes, light soups, and home-made pills and potions.

== Publication ==
The book was first published in 1839, issued by the Bureau de Dictionnaire Géneral de Cuisine. It was reissued by Audot in 1853 and by Éditions Plon in 1866 and 1886.

== Sources ==
- Courchamps, Maurice Cousin, comte de (conjecturally) (1839). Néo-physiologie du goût par ordre alphabétique. Paris: Bureau de Dictionnaire Géneral de Cuisine. OCLC 1040235441.
- David, Elizabeth (2008) [1960]. French Provincial Cooking. London: Folio Society. OCLC 809349711.
- Davidson, Alan (1999). The Oxford Companion to Food. Oxford: Oxford University Press. ISBN 978-0-19-211579-9.
- Vicaire, Georges (1890). Bibliographie gastronomique. Paris: Rouquette et fils. OCLC 1040218762.
