= Jean-Benoît-Vincent Barré =

French architect

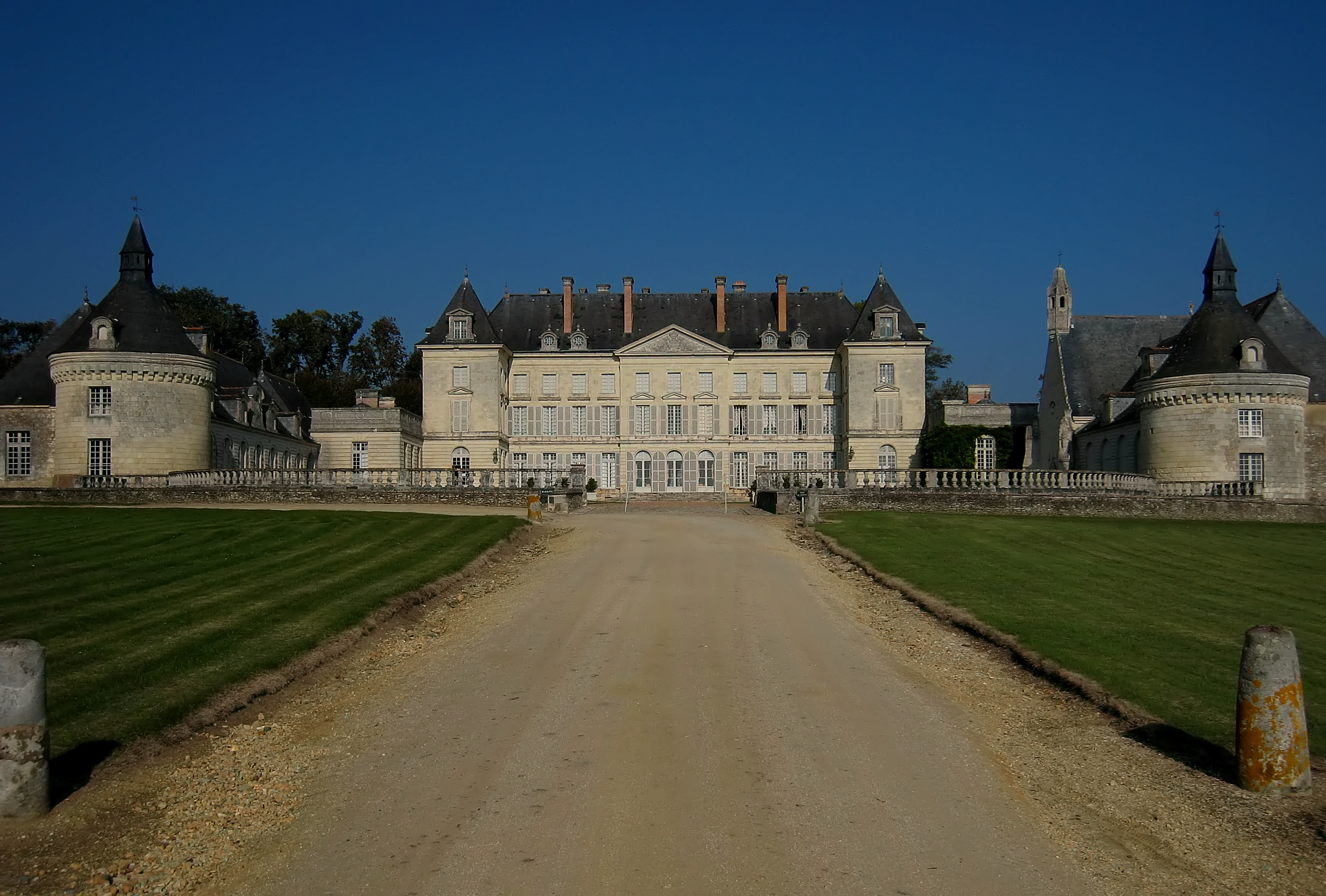
Castle Montgeoffroy 2007

Jean Benoît Vincent Barré (French pronunciation: [ʒɑ̃ bənwa vɛ̃sɑ̃ baʁe]; Seine-Port, Seine-et-Marne, 22 January 1735 – Seine-Port, 27 January 1824) was a French architect. He was one of the most important architects of the 18th century and one of the creators of the 'Louis XVI style' of architecture.

== Biography ==
Jean Benoît Vincent Barré learned architecture in the school of Antoine Matthieu Le Carpentier, from whom he also derived part of his clientele. He worked for very rich patrons, erecting sumptuous and elegant buildings, perfectly fitted to the taste of the day. His career nevertheless remains relatively unknown. He worked for financiers like Laurent Grimod de La Reynière, for whom he built the famous Hôtel Grimod de La Reynière in Paris, Jean-Joseph de Laborde or for Laborde's father-in-law, Mathias de Nettine, banker at the Austrian court.

Through Nettine's influence, he was commissioned for the redevelopment of a vast section of Brussels following the demolition of the ruined Palace of Coudenberg in the early 1770s, including the master plan for the Place Royale/Koningsplein and Church of St. James on Coudenberg whose final design would be produced by Barnabé Guimard. He is also credited for the design of one of the mansions on rue Royale, at present-day numbers 54 and 56, the only one not designed by Guimard.

In 1770, Barré was named inspector of the buildings for the king's gunpowder and saltpeter, during which appointment he built his best-known work, the château du Marais (1772–1779), for Jean Le Maître de La Martinière, treasurer-general of the artillery. For Louis Georges Érasme de Contades, maréchal de Contades, he rebuilt the château de Montgeoffroy, in Anjou. Underrated by his fellow architects, only one other backed he is presenting himself to the Royal Academy of Architecture.

In 1772, Barré gave himself over to property speculation in the Nouvelle France quartier of Paris, in association with Jean-François Perrin de Cypierre, intendent of the généralité of Orléans. Later he speculated in association with Antoine Roy, who married Barré's daughter Adélaïde-Sophie in 1793 and had two daughters by her. (Roy made a great fortune and became finance minister upon the Bourbon Restoration.)

In 1797, Barré retired to his property of La Chesnaye at Seine-Port where he died of old age in 1824.

== Main projects ==
- Château d'Hénonville (Oise), between Pontoise and Beauvais, rebuilt for Jean-Marie Roslin d'Ivry, 1765–1771.
- Château de Montgeoffroy (Maine-et-Loire), 1772–1775, rebuilt for marshal Louis Georges Érasme de Contades.
- Château du Marais (Essonne), main work of the Louis XVI style, 1772–1779.
- Hôtel Grimod de La Reynière, corner of Avenue Gabriel and Rue Boissy d'Anglas, Paris, for Laurent Grimod de La Reynière, 1775 (destroyed).
- Château du Lude (Sarthe), 1785, for the marquess of La Vieuville : Barré realised an important landscaped garden in removing the previous courtyard, building a portico to the western rooms and constructing the wing in the Louis XVI style. To the east, he masked the towers using parallel pavillons with higher roofs than the central pavillon, created a unified facade. The somewhat archaistic allure of this facade also avoids too marked a rupture with the 17th century parts of the building.
- For the financier Jean-Joseph de Laborde, Barré created interior decorative schemes and, above all, more of his famous garden landscapes (in collaboration with the painter Hubert Robert) : cenotaph of Cook, rostrum-type column, temple of filial Pietas, Gothic tower, ruined bridge.
- Hôtel Micault d'Harvelay, quartier de la chaussée d'Antin, Paris, for Joseph Micault d'Harvelay, Jean-Joseph de Laborde's father in law (destroyed).
- Hôtel d'Aubeterre, quartier de la chaussée d'Antin, Paris (destroyed).
- Hôtel de Cypierre, 26 rue du Faubourg-Poissonnière, Paris, for Jean-François Perrin de Cypierre (destroyed).
- Hôtel Barré, 24 rue du Faubourg-Poissonnière, Paris, for himself.
- Hôtel de Lalive, rue d’Artois
- Maison de Monsieur Girault, Boulevard de la Chaussée d’Antin
- Hôtel de Laborde, Boulevard des Italiens
- Transformation of the château de Chevilly (Loiret), for Jean-François Perrin de Cypierre.
- rue Royale 54-56, Brussels; later home of Banque Matthieu, Compagnie de Bruxelles, and head office annex of Forminière, rebuilt in 1909 (56) and 1937 (54) with original façade design preserved
