= Ferme générale =

Historical tax collection system in France

The ferme générale (French pronunciation: [fɛʁm ʒeneʁal], "general farm") was, in ancien régime France, essentially an outsourced customs, excise and indirect tax operation. It collected duties on behalf of the King (plus hefty bonus fees for themselves), under renewable six-year contracts. The major tax collectors in that highly unpopular tax farming system were known as the fermiers généraux (singular fermier général), which would be tax farmers-general (Note: The English word "farmer" in the sense of "agricultural producer" is derived from the French word fermier which means "leaseholder" (of an agricultural business or any other thing). Initially the word "farmer" designated in England only those agricultural producers who were not the owners of the land they were cultivating. Subsequently "farmer" became the generic term of all agricultural entrepreneurs, whether they owned the cultivated soil or not.) in English.

In the 17th and 18th centuries the fermiers généraux became immensely rich and figure prominently in the history of cultural patronage, as supporters of French music, major collectors of paintings and sculpture, patrons of the marchands-merciers and consumers of the luxury arts in the vanguard of Parisian fashions. In his 1833 novel Ferragus, writer Honoré de Balzac attributes the sad air that hangs about the Île Saint-Louis in central Paris to the many houses there owned by fermiers généraux. Their sons or grandsons purchased patents of nobility and their daughters often married into the aristocracy. Especially members of impoverished aristocratic families were eager to marry daughters of the fermiers généraux in order to restore the wealth they had prior to their ruin. This was called in popular French redorer son blason (literally "to re-gild one's coat of arms").

== History ==
Before the French Revolution in 1789, the public revenue was based largely on the following taxes:

- The Taille – Direct land tax imposed on French peasant and non-noble households, based on how much land they held. In some provinces, the principle of taille réelle was used, which meant that the tax was based on the actual market value of the real estate. In a majority of provinces the taille personnelle was applied: the tax level was the result of an arbitrary and gross estimation of the real estate value. Noblemen, public office holders and the inhabitants of the large cities were exempt from the taille.
- The Taillon – Tax for military expenditure.
- The Vingtième (one-twentieth) – Based solely on revenue (5 percent of net earnings from land, property, commerce, industry and from official offices).
- The Gabelle – A very complicated system of taxes and outsourced regional monopolies on salt, with enormous price disparities between the different provinces (e.g. the salt price in Paris was thirty times higher than in Brittany) that were a strong enticement to smuggling.
- The Aides – National tariffs on various products, including wine and tobacco.
- The Traites – Custom duties for either the import or export of goods to and from France, or for the transport of goods from one French province to the neighbouring one (internal customs).
- The Octroi – A local tariff levied on products entering the cities, especially Paris.
- The Droits féodaux (feudal rights), a long list of petty duties for every possible event or activity in a peasant's life (the right to marry, to inherit, to use the mill, to use the roads of the local aristocrat, to be exempt from doing mandatory chores for the local lord, etc.), to be paid to the local lord, the King or both and generally considered by the peasant to be arbitrary and humiliating.
- The Dîme ("the tenth [part]) – A mandatory tithe to support the state church and its clergy, collected by the local vicars, monks or bishops (and so, not a tax in the legal sense). The Dîme had to be paid either in legal tender (money) or in material assets by all residents regardless of their religion.

=== Tax farming before Colbert ===
The Ferme générale developed at a time when the monarchy suffered from chronic financial difficulties. The Affermage (leasing, outsourcing) of the collection of the traite (customs duties and taxes) had the advantage of guaranteeing the Treasury foreseeable and regular receipts, while reducing the perception of its role in tax-collection. The rights were initially contracted separately to various tax farmers, who were named traitants (who had the right to collect the traite) or partisans (who had a share (partie) in the collection of the traite). They were obliged to pay to the Royal Treasury the sum stipulated in their lease, and they received a share of the income and a share of any "unexpected" surplus. Each right was leased separately, which caused great administrative complexity: the taking of goods out of bond could involve several tax farms. Prior to 1598, this system had developed so that the tax farms were allocated among five pays (parts of France).

In 1598 the Superintendent of Finances, the Duke of Sully, entrusted tax collection to one farm instead of five separate ones, and subjected the collection of duties raised in the provinces to the rights of the King. The single tax farm was called the Cinq Grosses Fermes (five large farms). In 1607, he issued new rules (Règlement Général sur les Traites) on the collection of duties in an attempt to harmonize procedures. He also attempted to constitute the whole of France into a single customs area, but was without success, as the provinces "considered foreign" (i.e. which became part of France after the foundation of the Kingdom; especially the south and Brittany) refused to merge with the zone covered by the Cinq Grosses Fermes. By the middle of the 17th century, France was divided for tax purposes into three principal zones:

- Provinces of the Cinq Grosses Fermes without any internal customs duties (since 1664 by decision of Colbert)
- Provinces "considered foreign" and therefore had negotiated lower rates on some taxes
- Provinces "effectively following the example of the provinces considered foreign" (i.e. the last to become part of France; especially Lorraine and Alsatia) which formed tax-free zones when doing trade with the neighbouring foreign countries.

Not all fermiers-généraux constrained their viewpoint to their own enrichment: Pierre-Paul Riquet, appointed collector in Languedoc-Roussillon in 1630, used his fortune to build the Canal du Midi that links the Mediterranean coast of France to Toulouse and then on to the system of canals and rivers that ran across to the Bay of Biscay on the Atlantic coast, considered to be one of the great engineering feats of the 17th century.

=== The farm under Colbert: traitants and partisans ===
The process was further developed under the aegis of Jean-Baptiste Colbert, Minister of Finance to King Louis XIV. To reduce the number of these farmers and to increase the share of the collection transferred to the Royal Treasury, Colbert sought to gather a great number of rights together in fermes générales (general farms). The first fermes générales was instituted in 1680 to collect gabelles, aides, taille and douane .

Although sometimes of obscure origin, the financiers which took these rights often quickly accumulated immense fortunes which enabled them to play a significant political and social role. Their greed and excesses shocked the public and were often turned into objects of ridicule in literature, for example by playwright Alain-René Lesage in his 1709 comedy Turcaret, which was inspired by financier Paul Poisson de Bourvallais.

=== The Ferme générale (1726–90) ===
In 1726, all the existing farms were gathered in a single lease. The forty farmers-general, who held guarantees as contractors of the lease, became powerful and fabulously rich. Examples of the first generation of these tax farmers include Antoine Crozat, the first private owner of French Louisiana, the four Pâris brothers, and Alexandre Le Riche de La Poupelinière.

Increased criticism of the Ferme générale system led the government to introduce new regulations in 1769, which turned the collection of taxes and the administration of the service to which taxation was entrusted to public organisations, with their managers receiving a fixed remuneration. The public career of the reforming economist Anne-Robert-Jacques Turgot began with his appointment in 1761 as intendant of the généralité of Limoges.

In 1780, at the initiative of Jacques Necker, finance minister to Louis XVI, indirect taxes were distributed between three tax farm companies: the Ferme générale (for customs duties), the Ligue générale (for taxes on alcohol) and the Administration générale des domaines et des droits domaniaux (for land taxes and fees for land registration).

By the end of the 18th century, the Ferme générale system became a symbol of an unequal society. The Ferme générale, and the great wealth of its proprietors, was seen as encapsulating all the perversions of the political and social system. People blamed the injustices and annoyances – which actually arose from the complexity of the tax system – on the company itself, including the brutality of tax collecting troops and the brutal repression of smuggling. The gabelle (tax on salt) was the most unpopular of all the taxes.

The Ferme générale was thus one of the institutions of the Ancien Régime which was most criticised during the 1789 French Revolution. It was depicted as a group of predatory tyrants; the Girondist politician Antoine Français de Nantes, made an early reputation for himself attacking this prominent target. The Ferme générale was then suppressed in 1790, with farmers-general paying the price at the scaffold: 28 former members of the consortium were guillotined on 8 May 1794. Among them was Antoine Lavoisier, the father of modern chemistry, whose laboratory had been supported by income from his administration of the Ferme générale. His wife, the chemist Marie-Anne Pierrette Paulze, who escaped the guillotine, was herself the daughter of another farmer-general, Jacques Paulze.

=== Organisation ===
The lease of the Ferme générale was regulated by six-year contracts between the King and an individual who acted as a figurehead for the company. The Ferme générale held guarantee for the contractor. The number of partners was fixed at 40, after having reached nearly 90 earlier. The contractor committed himself to paying the Royal Treasury the amount of the lease and received in return any surplus. In 1780 an upper limit was set for this remuneration.

The Ferme générale had its headquarters in Paris. In its central offices it employed nearly 700 people, including two chaplains. Its local operations included up to 42 provincial offices and nearly 25,000 agents distributed in two branches of activity; that of the offices which checked, liquidated and charged the fees and that of the guards' brigades which sought and suppressed smuggling with very severe punishments (such as hard labour or hanging).

The employees of the Ferme générale were not royal civil servants but they acted in the name of the king, and therefore benefited from particular privileges and the protection of the law. In addition, members of the guards' brigades had the right to bear weapons. The managing of the company was handled collectively by the Ferme générale. They met as committees of experts and had control of the company's external services.

The day before the French Revolution in 1789, almost all the rights of indirect drafts and rights (like the gabelle, the tax on tobacco, and a number of local taxes) were awarded. On the other hand, the Royal Treasury's income from the Ferme générale represented more than half of the total public revenue. The company had also built the 24-kilometre Wall of the Farmers-General between 1784 and 1791 in Paris to ensure the payment of taxes on goods entering the city.

== Criticism of tax collection methods ==
The Ferme générale was one of the most hated components of the ancien régime because of the profits it took at the expense of the state, the secrecy of the terms of its contracts, and the violence of its armed agents. Criticism of the Ferme générale also include:

- Public bodies were deprived of a resource
- Service rendered was not always better in the long term
- The cost could be higher for the taxpayer, who paid his taxes plus the margin taken by the Ferme générale
- The recovery of debts (of tax arrears) by the Ferme générale could be brutal
- Depriving itself of a resource, the community became involved in debt, and had to find new taxes to obtain additional money

Therefore, at the end of the 18th century, the French state had become involved in considerable debt, which factored among the causes of the French Revolution.

== Cultural role of farmers-general ==
The farmers-general of the Ancien Régime figure prominently in the history of cultural patronage in France. The enlightened farmer-general Le Normant de Tournehem was the legal guardian of Madame de Pompadour, responsible for her education - in turn, thanks to her influence, he was made director-general of the Bâtiments du Roi in December 1745, and held the post, overseeing royal building works at the King's residences in and around Paris, until his death in 1751. As American architect Fiske Kimball observed, “Without artistic prejudices, he was a man of ability, honesty and simplicity, who devoted himself to efficient administration".

Farmers-general also figured among prominent supporters of French music and collectors of paintings and sculpture, such as Pierre Grimod du Fort, and as patrons of the marchands-mercier, a type of merchants who dealt with decorative art objects.

As consumers of luxurious art the farmers-general were at the vanguard of Parisian fashion, like Ange Laurent Lalive de Jully, a patron of arts who embraced the early form of neoclassicist style in decorative arts called the goût grec (lit. "Greek taste"). Others merely made themselves notorious for their squander, like Ange Laurent's brother Denis Joseph de La Live d'Épinay, the estranged husband of the writer and saloniste Louise d'Épinay. The gourmand Alexandre Balthazar Laurent Grimod de La Reynière was the son of the farmer-general Laurent Grimod de La Reynière.

Sons or grandsons of farmer-generals often purchased patents of nobility, with their daughters marrying into aristocracy.

== Voltaire and the fermiers ==
In his Voltaire, A Life (pp. 427–31), Ian Davidson describes events on Voltaire's estate at Ferney, north of Geneva, in the 1770s.

In 1770, hundreds of watchmakers fled the political ructions in Geneva and went to make a new life at Ferney. Voltaire helped them to set up a new watchmaking business. He negotiated a tax exemption for the watchmakers with the duc de Choiseul, Prime Minister of France. But by 1774, the business was prospering and the tax farmers started to take an interest. Three-way negotiations between the tax farmers, Voltaire and Turgot ensued. In December 1775, Turgot confirmed the watchmakers' exemption from the salt tax (gabelle) and from road maintenance duties (corvée) and a figure was agreed to compensate the tax farmers for loss of revenue. Voltaire addressed a public meeting on 12 December and the watchmakers accepted the settlement.

Two days later, Voltaire wrote to his friend Mme de Saint-Julien:

... while we were gently passing our time in thanking M. Turgot, and while the whole province was busy drinking, the gendarmes of the tax farmers, whose time runs out on 1 January, had orders to sabotage us. They marched about in groups of fifty, stopped all the vehicles, searched all the pockets, forced their way into all the houses and made every kind of damage there in the name of the king, and made the peasants buy them off with money. I cannot conceive why the people did not ring the tocsin against them in all the villages, and why they were not exterminated. It is very strange that the ferme générale, with only another fortnight left for them to keep their troops here in winter quarters, should have permitted or even encouraged them in such criminal excesses. The decent people were very wise and held back the ordinary folk, who wanted to throw themselves on these brigands, as if on mad wolves.

According to Davidson, good sense prevailed despite this violence, Voltaire was appointed a tax commissioner, profits peaked in 1776 and the watchmaking business survived the revolution and continued "well into the nineteenth century".

== See also ==
- Smuggling in pre-revolutionary France
- Wall of the Fermiers généraux
