= Jean Anthelme Brillat-Savarin =

French lawyer, politician and culinary writer

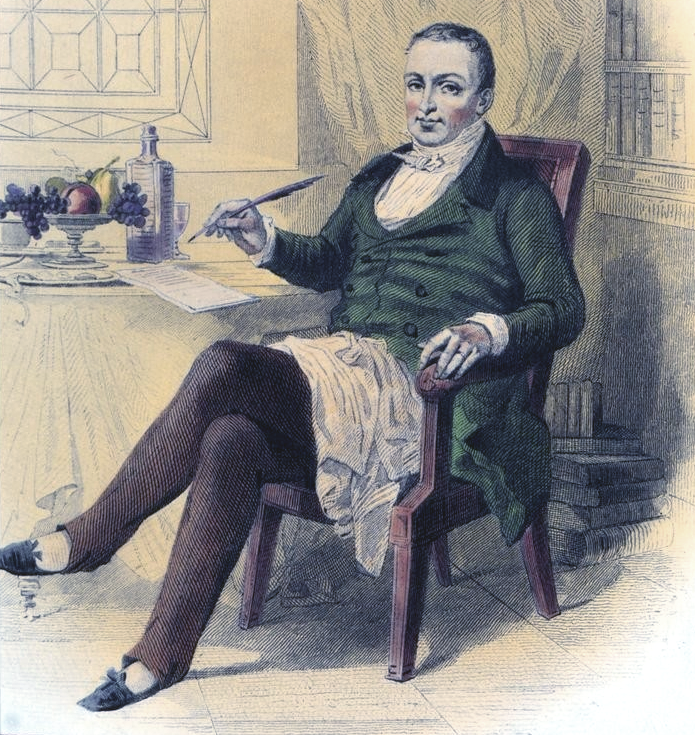
- Posthumous portrait, 1848
- Born: 2 April 1755 Belley, France
- Died: 2 February 1826 (aged 70) Paris, France
- Resting place: Père Lachaise Cemetery
- Notable works: Physiologie du goût (The Physiology of Taste)

"Tell me what you eat, and I will tell you what you are."

— Aphorism IV, Physiologie du goût

Jean Anthelme Brillat-Savarin (French pronunciation: [ʒɑ̃ ɑ̃tɛlm bʁija savaʁɛ̃]; 2 April 1755 – 2 February 1826) was a French lawyer and politician, who, as the author of Physiologie du goût (The Physiology of Taste), became celebrated for his culinary reminiscences and reflections on the craft and science of cookery and the art of eating.

Rising to modest eminence in the last years of France's Ancien Régime, Brillat-Savarin had to escape into exile when the Reign of Terror began in 1793. He spent nearly three years in the United States, teaching French and playing the violin to support himself, before returning to France when it became safe to do so, resuming his career as a lawyer, and rising to the top of the French judiciary.

The Physiology of Taste was the product of many years' writing in the author's spare time. Published weeks before his death in 1826, the work established him alongside Grimod de La Reynière as one of the founders of the genre of the gastronomic essay.

== Life and career ==
=== Early years ===
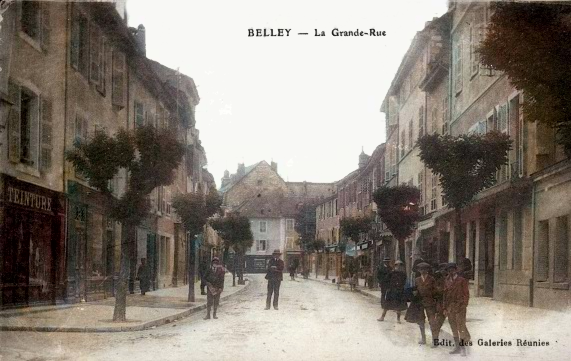
La Grande Rue, Belley, Brillat-Savarin's birthplace (c. 1900 photograph)

Jean Anthelme Brillat-Savarin was born on 2 April 1755 in the small cathedral city of Belley, Ain, 80 kilometres (50 miles) east of Lyon and a similar distance south of Bourg-en-Bresse. Belley was the principal city of the region of Bugey, which had been absorbed into France under the 1601 Treaty of Lyon.

Brillat-Savarin was descended on both sides from families of lawyers; his father, Marc-Anthelme Brillat-Savarin, was a leading lawyer in the city; his mother, Claudine-Aurore née Récamier, was the daughter of Belley's Notary Royal. Jean Anthelme was the eldest of the couple's eight children; of his two brothers, Xavier followed into the legal profession and Frédéric became an army officer.

In the household and region in which Brillat-Savarin grew up, good food was taken seriously; his relative and fellow lawyer Lucien Tendret wrote:

No region offers a greater variety of provisions for the table. Our beef is of prime quality, the flesh of the sheep reared in our mountains has the succulent flavour of that of pré-salé lamb, the hams cooked in our homes are as highly appreciated as the most famous in the world, and the traditional Belley sausage is as good as the Bologna mortadella. In our markets you will find plump capons, chickens, and ducks. Crayfish, trout, and pike abound in our rivers ... There is a profusion of truffles, morels, and mushrooms in our woods.

Brillat-Savarin learned from friends and acquaintances of his parents many unusual things about food, including a three-day method of cooking spinach, how to eat small game birds like ortolans, and how to prepare chocolate for drinking. His formal education proceeded along more conventional lines: he entered the Collège de Belley in 1764 or 1765. Although founded as a religious institution and with many of its staff in holy orders, the college was secular in outlook; theology was not in the curriculum and the library contained works on agriculture and science as well as books by La Rochefoucauld, Montesquieu, Rabelais, Voltaire and Rousseau. As a schoolboy, Brillat-Savarin took up the violin; he loved playing it, and although destined for the law he hankered for a while after a career as a violinist.

In the spring of 1774 Brillat-Savarin enrolled at the University of Dijon. His main study was law, but he undertook some extracurricular studies in medicine and attended lectures in chemistry by Louis-Bernard Guyton de Morveau, who became a friend and helpful counsellor.

=== Ancien Régime and revolution ===
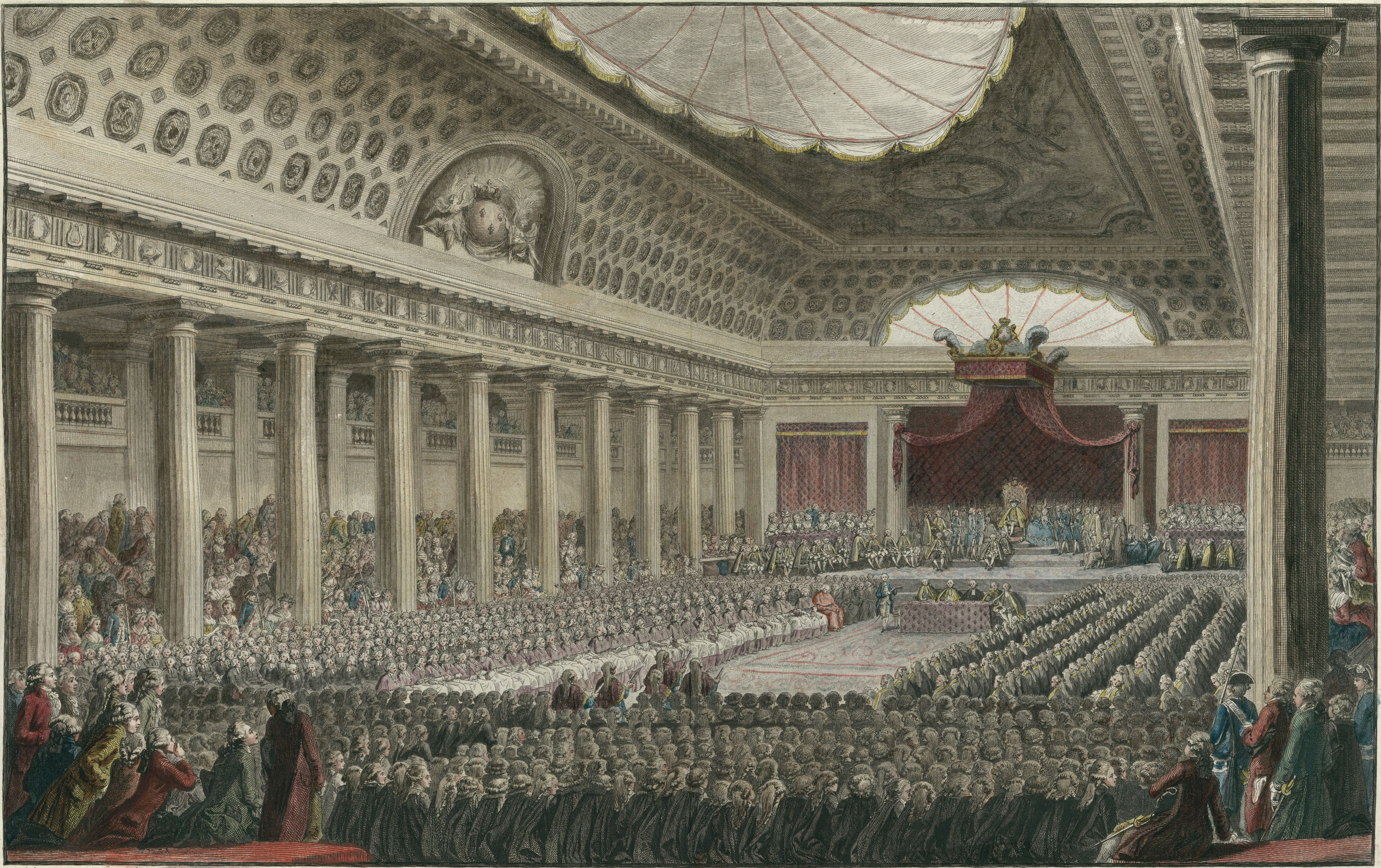
Opening of the Estates General, 1789

After graduating in 1778 Brillat-Savarin returned to Belley and practised law, making his first court appearance in September. He made good progress in his profession, and in 1781 he was appointed as a magistrate in the local civil court – lieutenant civil du bailliage. As he became more eminent locally he became involved with seeking action to alleviate the deprivations of the poor caused by years of financial crisis and poor harvests. In 1787 he first visited the royal residence, the Château de Versailles; his purpose may have been to seek help for the poor of his region, but he left no details of his mission.

Riots broke out in Grenoble in June 1788 in protest against the abolition of traditional and supposedly guaranteed local freedoms, and it became clear that effective government had so seriously collapsed that Louis XVI would have to summon a meeting of the Estates General, the closest approximation in Ancien Régime France to a national parliament; it had not met since 1614, and in the words of the historian Karen Diane Haywood it "generally met only in dire situations when the king and his ministers had no other choice".

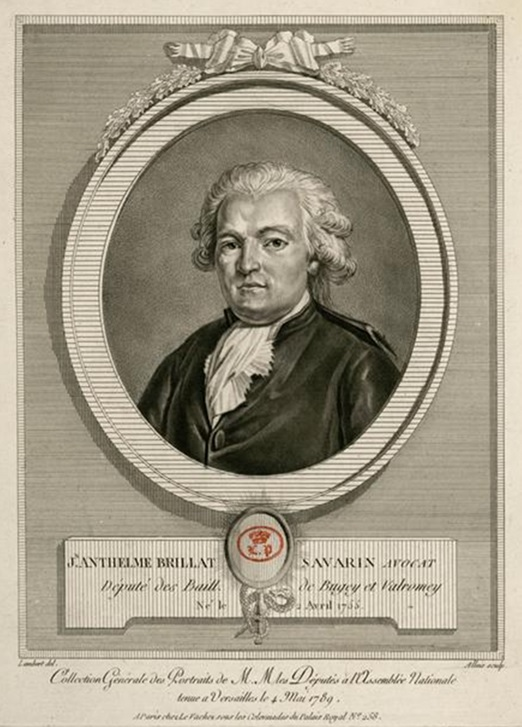
As a deputy to the National Constituent Assembly

When the King summoned the Estates General in 1789 Brillat-Savarin was elected to represent the Third Estate of Belley. In a biographical sketch Anne Drayton observes "there was nothing of the revolutionary in his make-up", and when the Estates General reformed as the National Constituent Assembly he made speeches opposing the division of France into eighty-three administrative departments, the introduction of trial by jury and the abolition of capital punishment.

At the end of his term of office in September 1791 Brillat-Savarin returned home as president of the civil tribunal of the new department of Ain, but as politics in Paris became increasingly radical, with the abolition of the monarchy, he was persona non grata with the new regime, and was dismissed from his post for royalist sympathies. Such was his popularity among his fellow citizens that in December 1792 he was elected mayor of Belley. For nearly a year he strove to protect his city from the excesses of the revolution, but when the Reign of Terror began in September 1793 he felt increasingly at risk of arrest and execution.

On 10 or 11 December he fled from France to Switzerland, where he took up residence in Lausanne. He later stayed with relations in Moudon, from whom he learnt his celebrated and later controversial recipe for fondue. (Note: According to Elizabeth David, "Brillat-Savarin's famous fondue ... is really a cream of eggs and cheese (not, be it noted, scrambled eggs and cheese) and has been rejected, I fancy, as being unauthentic either because it is more difficult to cook correctly than the Swiss version or because it is the cheese purveyors rather than the egg-marketeers who have been on the job".) He was joined by a fellow exile, Jean-Antoine de Rostaing, whose father, the Marquis Just-Antoine de Rostaing, had fought with the French forces in the American War of Independence. Rostaing suggested sailing to the United States; Brillat-Savarin agreed. They made their way to Rotterdam, where they took ship for an eighty-day voyage to Manhattan, disembarking on 30 September 1794.

=== American exile ===
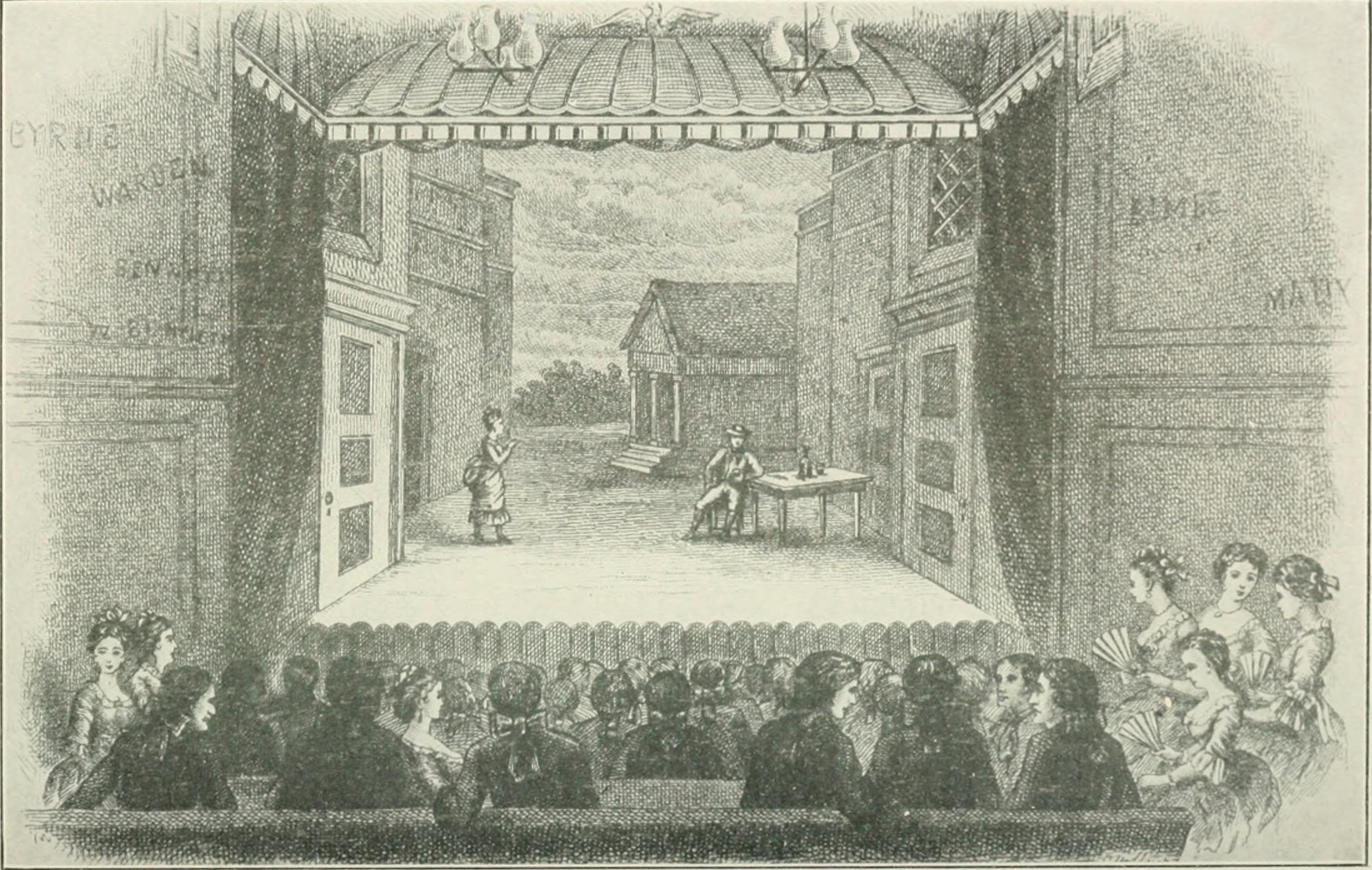
John Street Theatre, New York, where Brillat-Savarin earned a living as a violinist

Brillat-Savarin remained in the US for nearly two years, supporting himself by giving French and violin lessons. His biographer Giles MacDonogh observes, "He awarded himself the title of Professeur, by which he jocularly referred to himself to the end of his days". He also played first violin in America's only professional orchestra, at the John Street Theatre, New York. He later had fond memories of his time in America:

The happiness I enjoyed there was chiefly due to the fact that from the day of my arrival among the Americans, I spoke their language, dressed like them, took care not to be wittier than they, and praised all their ways; thus repaying the hospitality they showed me by a form of condescension which I consider essential and which I commend to all who may find themselves in a similar position.

While staying with a friend in Hartford, Connecticut he shot a wild turkey (Note: Turkeys had been familiar in France since the early 16th century, but were farmed there rather than wild, as in their native America.) and brought it back to the kitchen: he wrote of the roast bird that it was, "charming to behold, pleasing to smell, and delicious to taste". One of his favourite memories of his American stay was an evening at Little's Tavern in New York when he and two other French émigrés beat two Englishmen in a competitive drinking bout, in which they all consumed large quantities of claret, port, Madeira and punch.

=== Return to France ===
Rostaing grew tired of life in the US and returned to France in May 1795. Without him Brillat-Savarin was deprived of the closest friend of his years of exile. He continued to amuse himself with, among other diversions, what a biographer calls "undoubtedly numerous" encounters with the opposite sex; Brillat-Savarin commented, "being able to speak the language and flirt with women, I was able to reap the richest rewards". He hoped, nonetheless, to return to France, not least because he was running short of funds, and he sailed for home, arriving at the end of August 1796. By this time the political scene in France was no longer dominated by extremists: Robespierre and his allies from the Reign of Terror had fallen and France was ruled by the more moderate Directory. Brillat-Savarin persuaded the authorities that the legal penalties imposed on émigrés should be rescinded in his case.

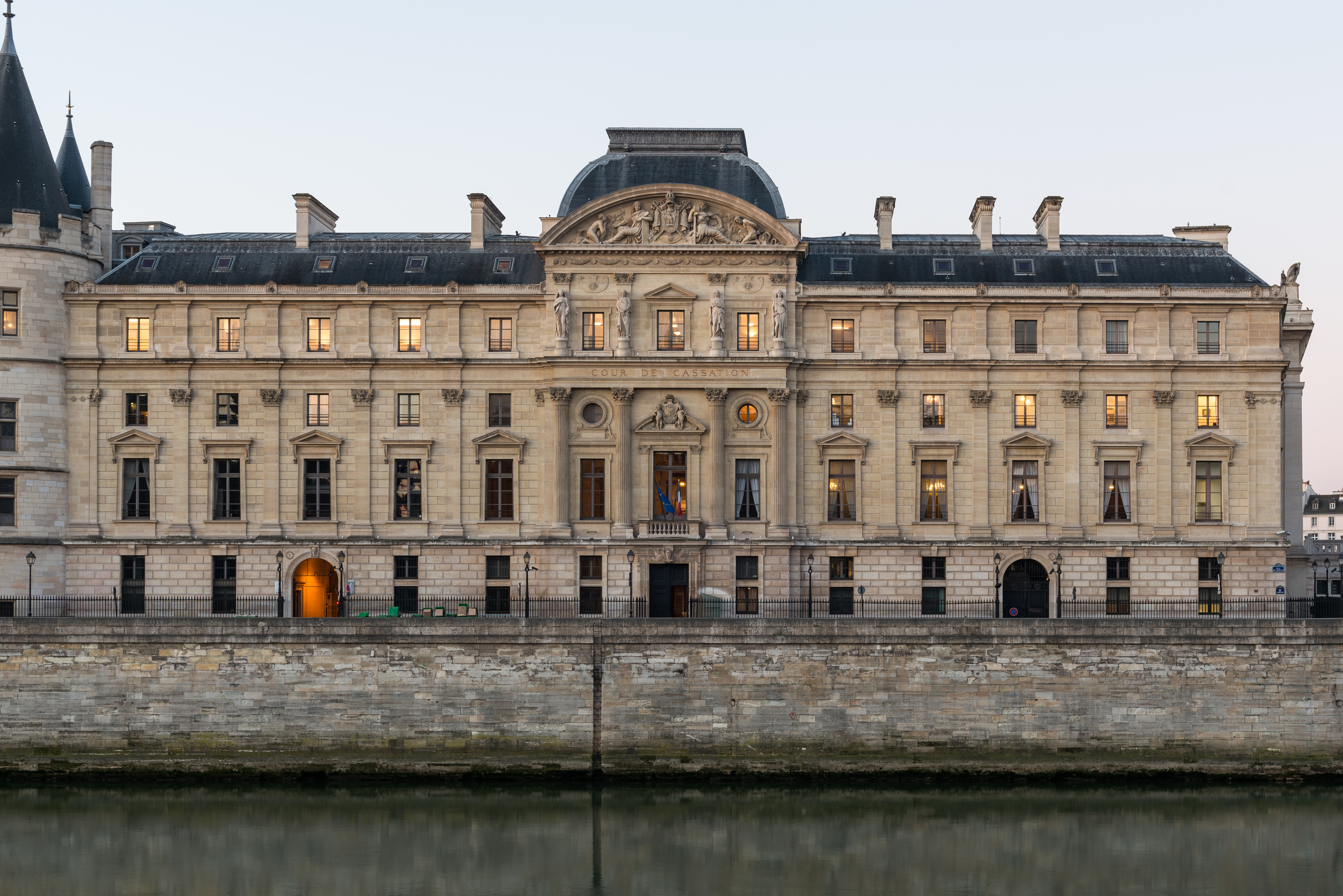
The Cour de cassation, Paris, to which Brillat-Savarin was appointed a judge in 1799

Through the influence of Rostaing, Brillat-Savarin was appointed as secretary to the staff of General Charles-Pierre Augereau, who led the French army fighting on the Rhine. Drayton comments that by this time Brillat-Savarin had obviously acquired a certain reputation as a gourmet, "for he was promptly put in charge of catering for the general staff, a task which he performed to the delighted satisfaction of his fellow officers".

After the end of the Rhine campaign the Directory appointed him as President of the Criminal Court of the Ain Department, based in Bourg-en-Bresse, in 1798, and then State Prosecutor for the Department of Seine-et-Oise, based in Versailles. After Napoleon Bonaparte engineered the fall of the Directory and establishment of the Consulate in 1799, Brillat-Savarin was appointed as a judge in the Tribunal de cassation, the supreme court of appeal, which sat in Paris. He was awarded the Legion of Honour in 1804, and in 1808 Napoleon made him a Chevalier de l'Empire.

=== Later years ===
For the rest of his life Brillat-Savarin led a contented existence, carrying out his judicial functions conscientiously, entertaining his friends, and writing. He remained a lifelong bachelor. Playing the violin continued to be a favourite pastime – by this time he could afford a Stradivarius – and although he never played professionally again he performed for his friends. In a study of Brillat-Savarin published in 1892, Lucien Tendret, one of his successors as mayor of Belley and one of the founders of L'Académie des Gastronomes, related a story of Brillat-Savarin's playing:

One day in the winter of 1808 he had come to dine at the home of one of his friends in the Faubourg Saint-Germain. When dinner was over, the young girls had a strong desire to dance, but none of them could play the music. One of the guests, the Abbé de Bombelles, recently promoted to the bishopric of Amiens, took to the piano, M. Brillat-Savarin took a violin and the dances began, led by this unique orchestra consisting of a bishop and a judge of the supreme court.

The dinners given by Brillat-Savarin at his house in the rue de Richelieu in Paris became famous for their excellence. Drayton comments that some of them were graced by the presence of his beautiful cousin, Juliette Récamier, who is mentioned in several places in Physiologie du goût. She looked to him for his wise advice, and Drayton surmises that he was in love with her: "So at least we may assume from the references to her in his great work, and from the dedication he wrote in the copy he sent her just before he died":

Madame, receive kindly and read indulgently the work of an old man. It is a tribute of a friendship which dates from your childhood and, perhaps, the homage of a more tender feeling. ... How can I tell? At my age a man no longer dares interrogate his heart.

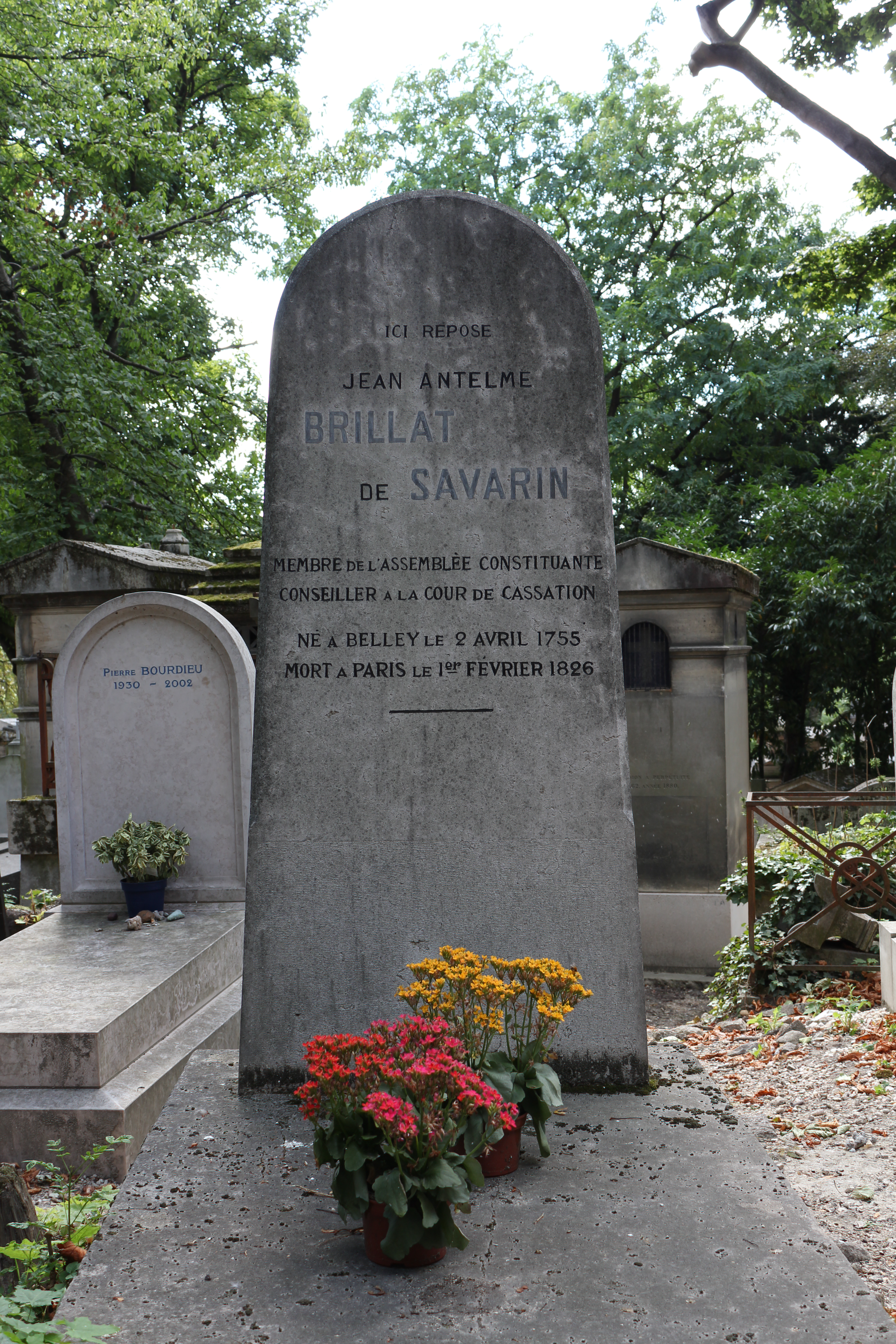
The grave of Brillat-Savarin, at Père-Lachaise, beside Pierre Bourdieu

For years Brillat-Savarin worked intermittently on his Physiologie du goût, adding, revising and polishing. Its contents were well known to his friends, and he finally yielded to their calls for him to publish it. He did so anonymously, although the author's name was soon widely known. It was published in December 1825, two months before his death.

On 2 February 1826, at the age of seventy, Brillat-Savarin died in Paris having attended a service in the Basilica of Saint-Denis while already having a cold, which turned to pneumonia. He was buried at the Père Lachaise Cemetery.

== Works ==
=== Physiologie du goût ===
The full title of the work for which Brillat-Savarin is known is Physiologie du goût, ou méditations de gastronomie transcendante; ouvrage théorique, historique et à l'ordre du jour, dédié aux gastronomes parisiens, par un professeur, membre de plusieurs sociétés littéraires et savantes. (Note: "The physiology of taste, or, Meditations of transcendent gastronomy; a theoretical, historical and topical work, dedicated to the gastronomes of Paris by a professor, member of several literary and scholarly societies") The book has been in print in France continuously since it first appeared in 1825.

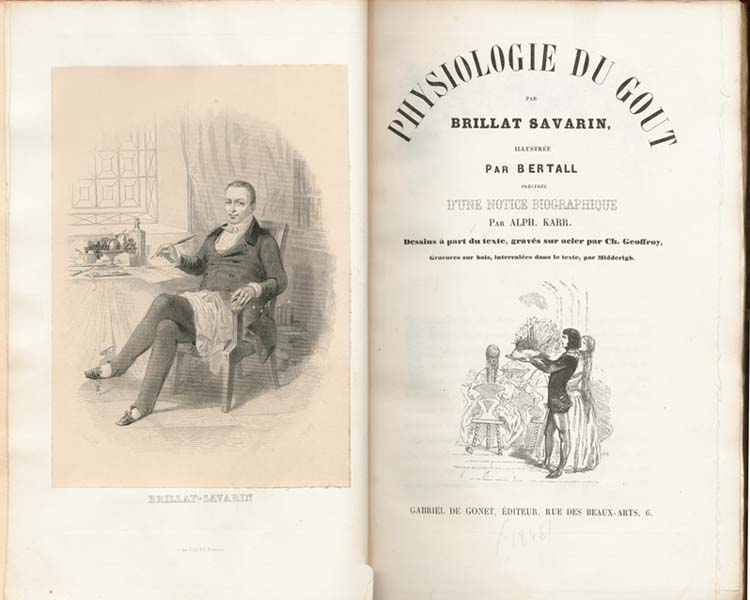
Title page of Physiologie du goût with a portrait of the author, 1848 edition

Translations into foreign languages followed. The first English version, by Fayette Robinson, was published in the US in 1854 under the title The Physiology of Taste: Or, Transcendental Gastronomy. Two translations were published in Britain during the 19th century: the first, which set a pattern for giving the book a new title, was The Handbook of Dining; Or, How to Dine, Theoretically, Philosophically and Historically Considered, translated by Leonard Francis Simpson (1859). (Note: In later editions the title of this translation was changed to Handbook of Dining: or Corpulency and Leanness Scientifically Considered.) It was followed by Gastronomy as a Fine Art: or, The Science of Good Living (1879), in a translation by R. E. Anderson. These three versions contained most, but not all, of Brillat-Savarin's text; the first complete translation into English was issued in 1884 by the London publishers Nimmo and Bain.

In The Oxford Companion to Food, Alan Davidson praises M. F. K. Fisher's American translation (The Physiology of Taste, 1949) as outstanding. (Note: Fisher said that her translation of Brillat-Savarin was her own favourite of her many books: "I like it, I respect it. I did it because his French was so good. It was so pure, so not effusive. He was just straight good prose.") A new English translation by Anne Drayton was published in 1970 under the title The Philosopher in the Kitchen; this version was reissued with a new title, The Pleasures of the Table, in 2011.

C. Vogt's German translation was published in 1865 as Physiologie des Geschmacks oder physiologische Anleitung zum Studium der Tafelgenüsse (Physiology of taste or physiological guidance for the study of pleasures of the table). It was followed by versions in Russian (Fiziologija vkusa, 1867), Spanish (Fisiología del gusto, 1869), Swedish (Smakens fysiologi, 1883), and Italian (La Fisiologia del Gusto, 1914).

The book is in two main sections. They are preceded by an opening section headed "Aphorisms", consisting of twenty short assertions about gastronomic topics, such as "Animals feed: man eats: only the man of intellect knows how to eat" and "The pleasures of the table belong to all times and all ages, to every country and every day; they go hand in hand with all our other pleasures, outlast them, and remain to console us for their loss". The longest section of the book is headed "Gastronomical Meditations", in which the author devotes short chapters to thirty topics, ranging from taste, appetite, thirst, digestion and rest to gourmands, obesity, exhaustion and restaurateurs. The second and smaller part of the main text consists of "Miscellanea", including many anecdotes on a gastronomic theme such as the bishop who mischievously presented his eager guests with fake asparagus made of wood, and memories of the author's exile.

=== Other works ===
In addition to his magnum opus, Brillat-Savarin wrote works about law and political economy: Vues et Projets d'Economie Politique (Political Economy: Plans and Prospects) (1802), Fragments d'un Ouvrage Manuscrit Intitulé Théorie Judiciare (Fragments of a work in manuscript entitled "Legal Theory") (1818), and a study of the archaeology of the Ain department (1820). He also wrote a history of duelling, and what Drayton calls "a number of rather racy short stories, most of which are lost", although one, Voyage à Arras, remains extant.

== Commemorations ==
The soft Brillat-Savarin cheese, made mainly in Normandy and also in Burgundy, was named in the writer's honour by the cheese-maker Henri Androuët in the 1930s. It is an industriel cheese with an affinage of one to two weeks. The writer is also commemorated in the dish Bordure de pommes Brillat-Savarin (Apple ring Brillat-Savarin), in which a cake steeped in syrup and flavoured with rum is surrounded with stewed apples bound with rum-flavoured crème pâtissière. The cake, known as a savarin, was invented by a Parisian maitre pâtissier, Julien, as a variant of a rum baba; it was originally called a Brillat-Savarin, later shortened to savarin.

To mark the centenary of Brillat-Savarin's death, commemorative banquets were given in 1926 at the Hôtel de Crillon in Paris and the Savoy Hotel in London. The dishes at the latter included two marking his name and birthplace: Les delices de Belley (a blend of foie gras and crayfish) and Les œufs brouilles Brillat-Savarin (scrambled eggs with truffles).

Brillat-Savarin's name is commemorated in streets in France and Belgium: avenues Brillat-Savarin in Brussels, Belley and Saint-Denis-en-Bugey and rues Brillat-Savarin in Paris, Bourg-en-Bresse, Nîmes and Dijon.

== Reputation and influence ==
Along with Grimod de La Reynière, Brillat-Savarin is credited with founding the genre of the gastronomic essay. Anthony Lane writes of him, "To say that The Physiology of Taste is a cookbook is like saying that Turgenev's Sportsman's Sketches is a guide to hunting."

By his choice of title Brillat-Savarin seems to have been responsible for a temporary change in French writers' use of the word physiologie, although he himself used it literally, in the sense of "a scientific analysis of the workings of living beings". Davidson points out that a third of the book is devoted to the chemistry and physiology of food and eating. Nonetheless:

Balzac, who wrote an admiring biographical essay on Brillat-Savarin, published The Physiology of Marriage in 1829, and less notable scholars dilated in succeeding decades on the physiology of the opera, the café, the umbrella, billiards, and 'the ridiculous,' among other things. In this short-lived genre, physiology was reduced to a synonym for character or portrait.

Thirteen years after his death, Brillat-Savarin's title was repurposed by an anonymous author or authors for Néo-physiologie du goût.

Brillat-Savarin was an early proponent of a low-carbohydrate diet. He considered sugar and white flour to be the cause of obesity and he suggested, instead, protein-rich ingredients:

Sure enough, carnivorous animals never grow fat (consider wolves, jackals, birds of prey, crows, etc.). Herbivorous animals do not grow fat easily, at least until age has reduced them to a state of inactivity; but they fatten very quickly as soon as they begin to be fed on potatoes, grain, or any kind of flour. ... The second of the chief causes of obesity is the floury and starchy substances which man makes the prime ingredients of his daily nourishment. As we have said already, all animals that live on farinaceous food grow fat willy-nilly, and man is no exception to the universal law.

He promoted a diet that avoided starch, grains, sugar and flour. He recommended meats, root vegetables, cabbage and fruit. Brillat-Savarin was concerned to reduce the use of fattening foods, but apparently did not consider cheese one of these. He was criticised in the 20th century by Elizabeth David for his remark that "dessert without cheese is like a pretty woman with only one eye", (Note: In the original French, Brillat-Savarin writes "Un dessert sans fromage est une belle à qui il manque un oeil" – "a dessert without cheese is a pretty woman who lacks an eye" – but the customary English rendition, used by Drayton and earlier translators reads "... is like a..." rather than "... is a...") David asked: "How much harm has that tyrannical maxim of Brillat-Savarin's done to all our waistlines and our digestions?"

The philosopher William Charlton writes that Brillat-Savarin "upstaged the aestheticians by treating taste simply as the sense by which we discern flavours". Charlton adds that Brillat-Savarin transmutes cooking, "which Plato had despised as a mere 'routine'", into philosophy, shaming Descartes and Kant in his meditations on, respectively, "Dreams" and "The End of the World". Charlton concludes that we can all profit from the Aphorisms with which Brillat-Savarin begins his book, for instance "The discovery of a new dish does more for the happiness of mankind than the discovery of a star".

== Notes, references and sources ==
=== Sources ===
- Androuët, Pierre (1983). Guide du fromage (in French). Paris: Stock. ISBN 978-2-23-401671-2.
- Boissel, Thierry (1989). Brillat-Savarin, 1755–1826: un chevalier candide (in French). Paris: Presses de la Renaissance. ISBN 978-2-85-616529-4.
- Bray, George A. (2011). A Guide to Obesity and the Metabolic Syndrome: Origins and Treatment. Boca Ralton: CRC Press. ISBN 978-1-4398-1458-1.
- Brillat-Savarin, Jean Anthelme (1852). Physiologie du goût (in French). Paris: Alphonse Pigoreau. OCLC 1040260000.
- Brillat-Savarin, Jean Anthelme (1981). The Philosopher in the Kitchen. London: Penguin. ISBN 978-0-14-046157-2.
- David, Elizabeth (1986) [1984]. An Omelette and a Glass of Wine. London: Penguin. ISBN 978-0-14-046721-5.
- David, Elizabeth (2008) [1960]. French Provincial Cooking. London: Folio Society. OCLC 809349711.
- Davidson, Alan (1999). The Oxford Companion to Food. Oxford: Oxford University Press. ISBN 978-0-19-211579-9.
- Drayton, Anne (1981). "Introduction". The Philosopher in the Kitchen. London: Penguin. ISBN 978-0-14-046157-2.
- Engelmann, Brigitte; Peter Holler (2008). Le Guide des gourmets fromage (in French). Toulouse: Ullmann. ISBN 978-3-83-315083-8.
- Fisher, M. F. K. (1992). Conversations with M. F. K. Fisher. Jackson: University Press of Mississippi. OCLC 1193399350.
- Harbutt, Juliet (1999). Cheese. Minocqua: Willow Creek Press. ISBN 978-1-57-223200-6.
- Haywood, Karen Diane (2017). The French Revolution: The Power of the People. New York: Lucent Press. ISBN 978-1-53-456051-2.
- Lok, Matthijs (2023). Europe Against Revolution: Conservatism, Enlightenment, and the Making of the Past. Oxford: Oxford University Press. ISBN 978-0-19-887215-3.
- MacDonogh, Giles (1992). Brillat-Savarin: The Judge and his Stomach. London: John Murray. ISBN 978-0-71-954711-9.
- Masui, Kazuko; Tomoko Yamada (2005). French Cheeses. London: Dorling Kindersley. ISBN 978-1-40-531211-0.
- Mennell, Stephen (1996). All Manners of Food: Eating and Taste in England and France from the Middle Ages to the Present (second ed.). Urbana: University of Illinois Press. ISBN 978-0-63-113244-8.
- Montagné, Prosper (1976). Larousse gastronomique. London: Hamlyn. OCLC 1285641881.
- Sperat-Czar, Arnaud; Rolland Barthelemy (2003). Guide du fromage (in French). Paris: Hachette Pratique. ISBN 2-01-23-6867-0.
- Tendret, Lucien (1892). La table au pays de Brillat-Savarin (in French). Belley: L. Bailly fils. OCLC 1040244307.
