= Ligue des Gourmands =

European dining club (1912–1914)

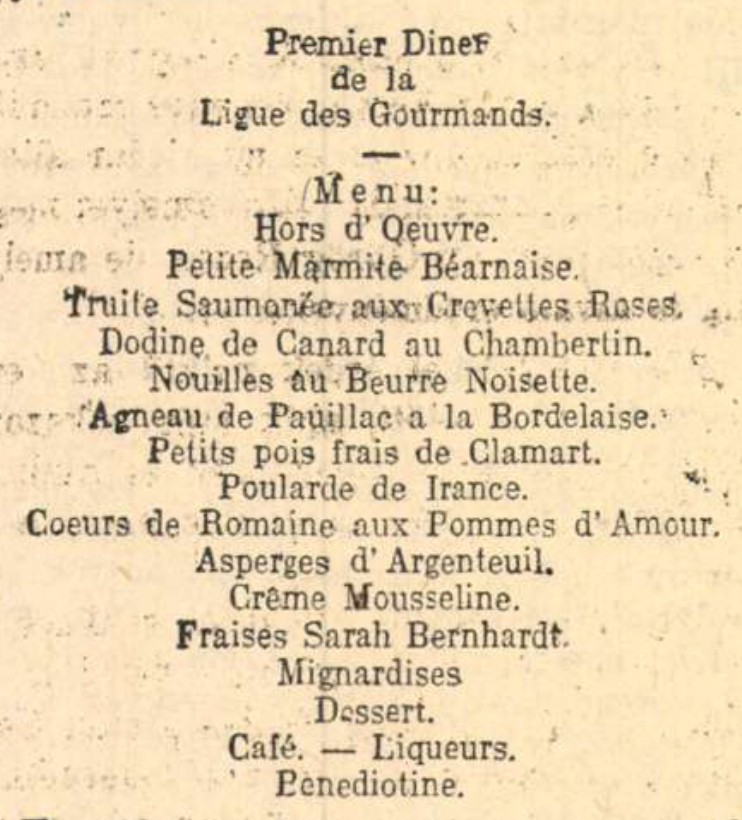

La Ligue des Gourmands was a dining club founded by Auguste Escoffier and his friends in February 1912. This club spread throughout Europe and attracted thousands of members. It is notable for the Dîners d'Epicure—menus that were served simultaneously in many restaurants. The first was served to over 4000 members in 37 European cities; the last, held in July 1914, was served to over 10,000 diners in 140 different cities.

The first menu included dodine de canard au chambertin, a duck casserole cooked in a dodine.

Nathaniel Newnham-Davis, in the Gourmet's Guide to London devoted a full chapter to the Ligue des Gourmands, noting that in 1914, the branch in London takes the lead in the number of members (60 members), followed by Paris (43 members). "Marseilles, New York and Montreal tie for third place with twelve members each" (p. 326). Other cities with members included Brussels, Delhi, Yokohama, and Zurich. Davis notes that members of the Ligue are French cooks or chefs.

== See also ==
- Gourmand
