= Antoine Français de Nantes =

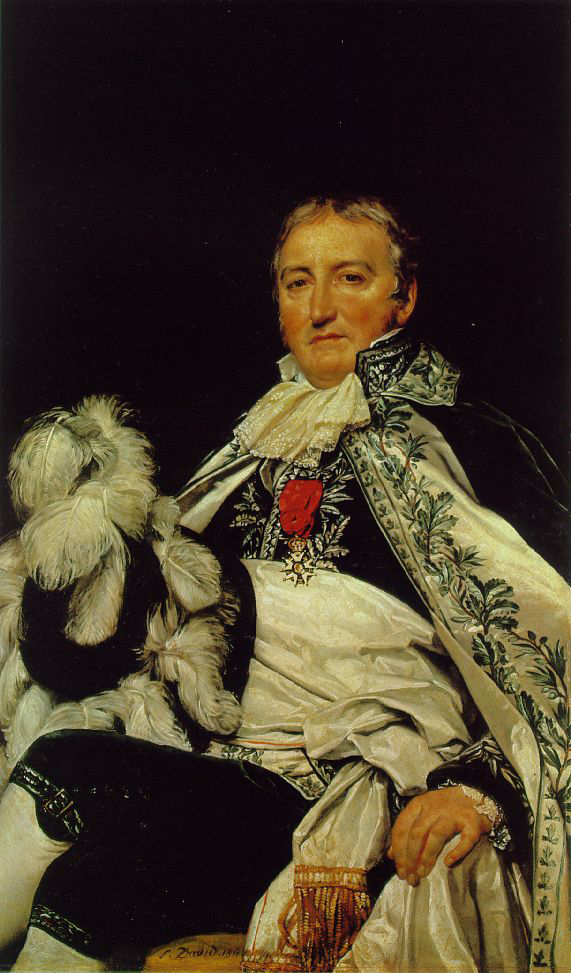
The Count Français of Nantes.

Antoine Français, comte de Nantes (1756 – 7 March 1836), better known as Français of Nantes, was a French Count active during the French Revolution and Empire.

== Biography ==
=== Revolution ===
Born in Beaurepaire, in the département of Isère, he was elected to the Legislative Assembly by the département of Loire-Inférieure in 1791, and was noted for his violent attacks upon the fermiers généraux and the Roman Catholic Church. However, he was not re-elected to the Convention.

During the Reign of Terror he had to seek refuge in the Alps, as he had belonged to the Girondist party. In 1798 he was elected to the French Directory's Council of Five Hundred by the département of Isère, and became one of its secretaries; and in the following year he voted against the Directory (see 18 Brumaire).

=== Consulate, Empire, and later life ===
Français of Nantes took office under the Consulate as préfet of Charente-Inférieure, rose to be a member of the Conseil d'État, and in 1804 obtained the important post of director-general of the indirect taxes (droits réunis). The value of his services was recognized by the titles of Count of the Empire and Grand Officer of the Legion of Honor.

On the Bourbon Restoration he retired into private life (as the owner of a Paris hôtel), but from 1819 to 1822 he was representative of the département of Isère, and after the July Revolution he was made a Peer of France. He died in Paris.

== Works ==
Français wrote a number of works, but his name is more likely to be preserved by the eulogies of the literary men to whom he afforded protection and assistance.

- Le Manuscrit de feu M. Jirme (1825)
- Recueil de fadaises composé sur la montagne à l'usage des habitants de la plaine (1826)
- Voyage dans la vallée des originaux (1828)
- Tableau de la vie rurale, ou l'agriculture enseignée d'une manière dramatique (1829).
