= Social club =

Group of people or place where they meet

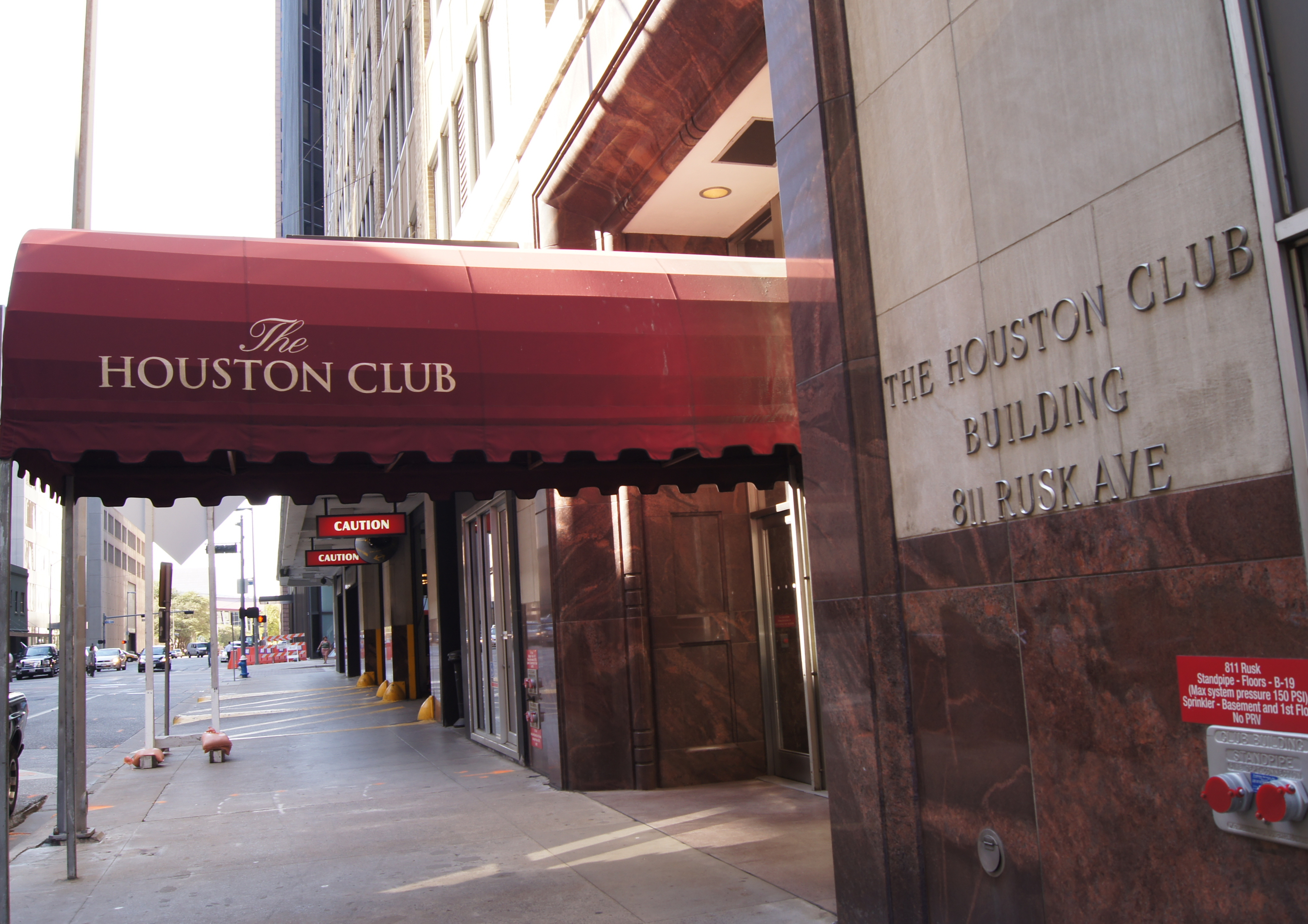
The Houston Club, a private social club in the U.S.

A social club or social organization may be a group of people or the place where they meet, generally formed around a common interest, occupation or activity with in an organizational association known as a club. Examples include book discussion clubs, chess clubs, country clubs, final clubs, strip clubs, fishing clubs, gaming clubs, women's clubs, gentlemen's clubs, private member’s clubs, hunting clubs, military officers' clubs, political clubs, religious clubs (such as Christian fellowships), traditional fraternal organizations, service clubs, fraternities and sororities (Greek-letter organizations), business networking clubs, science clubs, hobbyist clubs, informal professional associations, and university clubs. The term can also refer to a criminal headquarters, such as the Ravenite Social Club or the Cage.

This article covers only three distinct types of social clubs – the historic gentlemen's clubs, the modern activities clubs, and an introduction to fraternities and sororities. This article does not cover a variety of other types of clubs having some social characteristics. Social clubs have commonly been used by the Italian-American Mafia and other organized crime groups as headquarters, fronts, and meeting places, with many mob crews even being named after the club where they are based (The Palma Boys Crew, The Gemini Crew, The Veterans & Friends Crew).

== History ==
Working men's clubs developed in Britain during Victorian times as institutes where working class men could attend lectures and take part in recreational pursuits. The Reverend Henry Solly founded the Working Men's Club and Institute Union (CIU) for this purpose in 1862. Many middle-class social reformers founded these clubs during the temperance movement as a place to relax without alcohol, but in time this changed. They became a combination of public houses (pubs), music-halls and clubs, becoming places to be entertained, to drink socially and to play bar games. Working men's clubs are still prevalent across the United Kingdom, although not as popular.

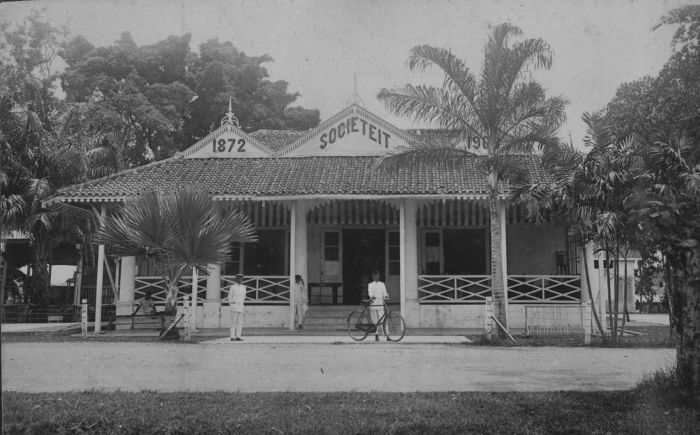
Sociëteit in Palembang, Sumatra

In the Dutch East Indies, sociëteits were established in various cities.

Modern clubs include Urban Diversion in San Francisco, which opened in 2003 as a general adventure and activities social club, and the Groucho Club in Soho, London, which opened in 1985 as "the antidote to the traditional club." The "traditional club" referred to is the elitist gentlemen's club, a fixture of British upper-class male society. This is not to be confused with the modern use of the phrase, which is now a euphemism for a strip club.

== Legalities ==
=== England and Wales ===
Clubs in England and Wales were not controlled by the licensing system until the Licensing Act 1902 was passed, or in Scotland until the Licensing (Scotland) Act 1903 (3 Edw. 7. c. 25) was passed. They were passed mainly to check the abuse of "clubs" being formed solely to sell intoxicating liquors free from the restrictions of the licensing acts, but it applied to all kinds of clubs in England and Wales. The act required the registration of every club that occupied any premises habitually used for the purposes of a club and in which intoxicating liquor was supplied to members or their guests. The secretary of every club was required to give a return to the clerk to the justices of the petty sessional division with this information:

1. the name and objects of the club
2. the address of the club
3. the name of the secretary
4. the number of members
5. the rules of the club relating to:
  1. the election of members and the admission of temporary and honorary members and of guests
  2. the terms of subscription and entrance fee, if any
  3. the cessation of membership
  4. the hours of opening and closing
  5. the mode of altering the rules

=== United States ===
Social and recreational clubs may be considered tax-exempt 501(c)(7) organizations under certain circumstances.

== Organization ==
=== United Kingdom ===
Typically, a social club has a constitution which states the club's objects, its structure, location of its activities, requirements of members, membership criteria and various other rules. British clubs are usually run by a committee that will also include three 'officer' positions – chair, secretary and treasurer.

== Social activities clubs ==
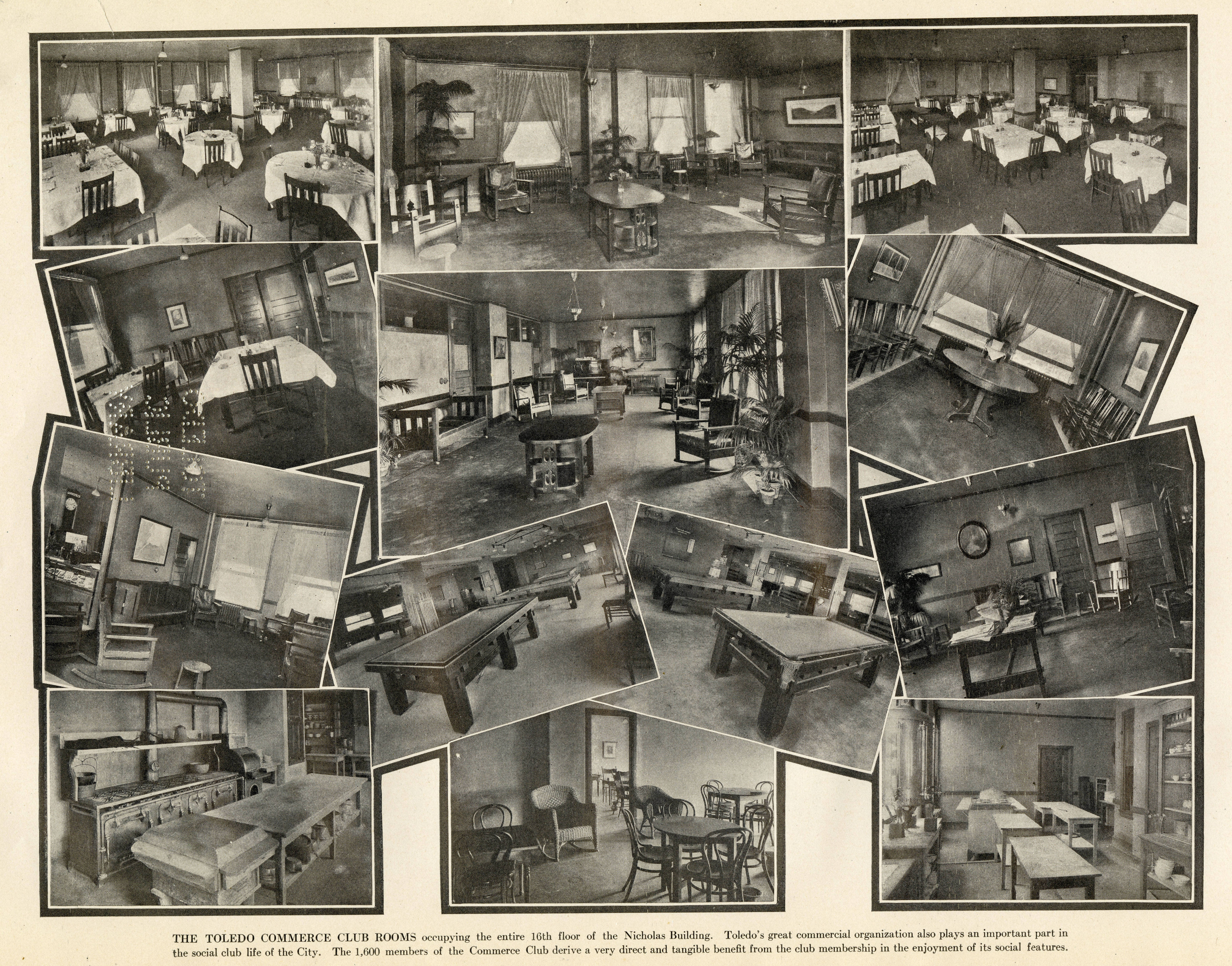
Views of the Toledo Commerce Club rooms as seen in "Bramble's views Toledo, Ohio: diamond anniversary 1837–1912"

Social activities clubs are a modern combination of several types of clubs and reflect today's more eclectic and varied society. These clubs are centered on the activities available to the club members in the city or area in which the club is located. Some have a traditional clubhouse, bar or restaurant where members gather, while others do not.

Events can include a broad range of activities, from sporting events and social parties to ballet, arts or book clubs. Unlike traditional clubs, they are not limited to one kind of event or special interest, but include a broad range of events in their monthly calendars. The members choose the events in which the club is going to take part, based upon the changing interests of the members. The members themselves determine the events they will attend of those offered.

Some social clubs are based around a shared identity among their members. Clubs exist for single people, married couples, and people of certain sexual orientations or ethnic backgrounds.

Membership can be limited or open to the general public, as can the events. Most clubs have a limited membership based upon specific criteria and restrict the events to members to increase their feeling of security, creating an increased sense of camaraderie and belonging. There are many examples of private social clubs, including the University Club of Chicago, The Mansion on O Street in D.C., the Penn Club of New York City and the New York Friars' Club.

Social activities clubs can be for-profit, non-profit or a combination of the two (a for-profit club with a non-profit charitable arm, for instance). Some social clubs have function halls which members, or sometimes the general public, can rent for parties.

A number of Jewish community centers and other organizations, such as the YMCA, have social clubs for people with social anxiety and learning disabilities. Membership in these clubs is limited to individuals with these conditions.

== Sororities and fraternities ==
Fraternities and sororities are part of "Greek life" prevalent in universities. Many young men and women pledge during their freshman year of college in order to become a "brother" or "sister" of a fraternity or sorority. These clubs are founded on principles of camaraderie and communal bonding. As social clubs, they are sometimes also philanthropic, hosting fundraisers for charities or on-campus events.

== See also ==
- Association of Conservative Clubs
- Cannabis Social Club
- Les Marmitons
- Liberal democracy
- List of American gentlemen's clubs
- Membership discrimination in California social clubs
- Socialist societies
