= Almanach des Gourmands =

19th-century French restaurant guide

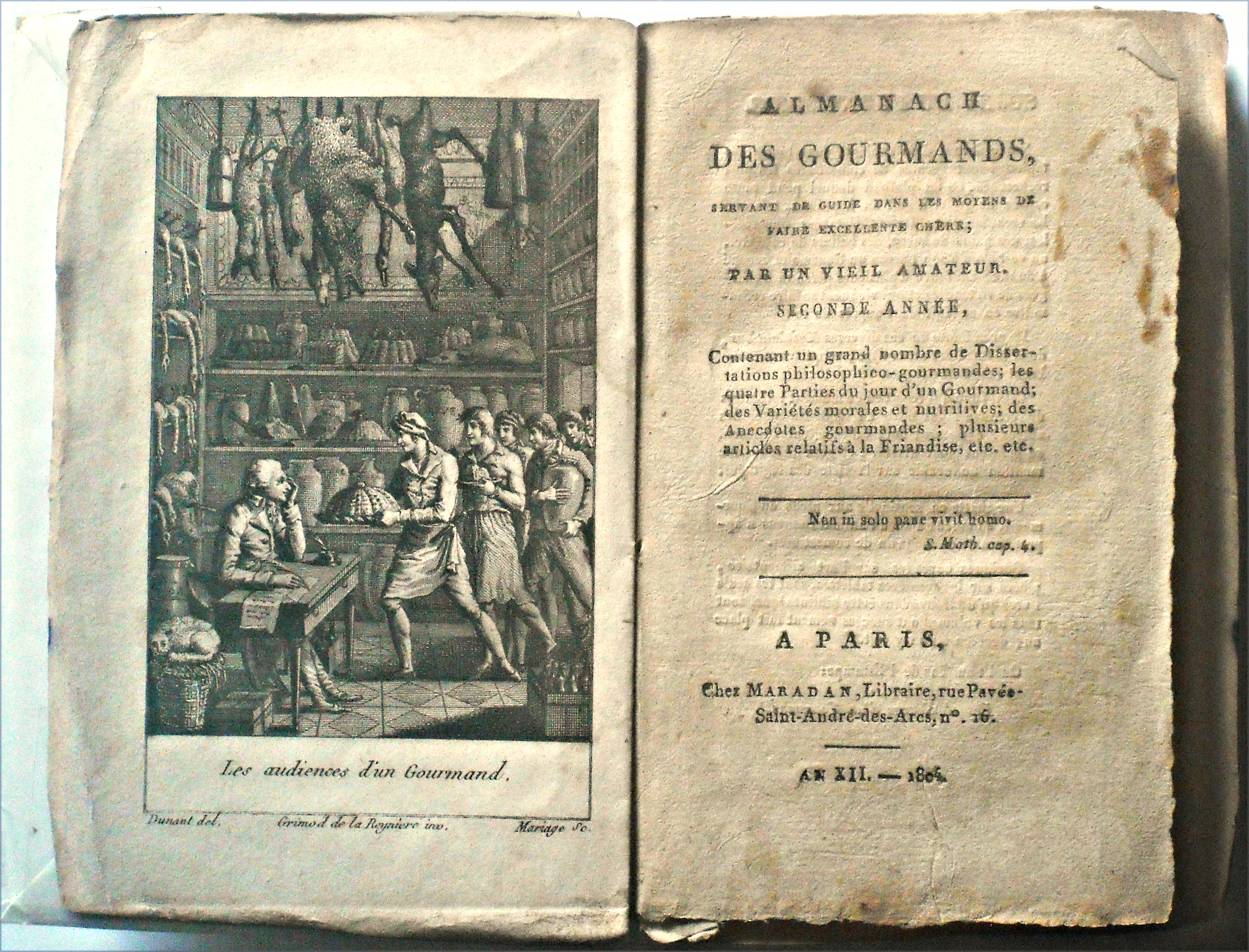
First page of Almanach des Gourmands, 2nd year

The Almanach des gourmands was a guide to the restaurants, pastry shops, and specialty food stores of Paris, edited and published by the French gastronome Alexandre-Balthazar-Laurent Grimod de La Reynière, known as Grimod, annually from 1803 to 1812. (Note: there was no 1809 or 1811 issue) It was written by a group of restaurant critics and Grimod himself. Grimod is thus often considered the first restaurant critic.

The Almanach was written for Parisians rather than travelers, and for the first time, wrote for consumers who sought taste rather than cheap prices or convenience. When it was published, restaurants were gaining prominence in Paris, the first having opened in the 1770s. Its reviews of food and establishments were sometimes strongly critical. Roy Strong argues that the Almanach opened up the culture around food to anyone who was literate, and increased competition between restaurants.

The title was revived several times:

- Nouvel almanach des gourmands, A.B. de Périgord (pseudonym for Horace-Napoléon Raisson and Léon Thiessé), from 1825-1827, continued the volume numbering although it was editorially distinct.
- Le Nouvel Almanach des gourmands, Charles Monselet, 1865, together with Alexandre Dumas (père), Aurélien Scholl, Jean-Camille Fulbert-Dumonteil, Ernest d'Hervilly, Joseph Albert Alexandre Glatigny, Adrien Marx, Timothée Trimm, Eugène Chavette, Victor Cochinat, Vermesch.
- L'Almanach des gourmands, François-Guillaume Dumas, (Note: not closely related to Alexandre Dumas) 1904, together with Phileas Gilbert, Auguste Escoffier, and Prosper Montagné.

== Sources ==
- Ferguson, Priscilla Parkhurst (2014). "The French Invention of Modern Cuisine". In Freedman, Paul; Chaplin, Joyce E; Albala, Ken (eds.). Food in Time and Place: The American Historical Association Companion to Food History. Oakland, California: University of California. ISBN 978-0-520-27745-8.
- Grimes, William (2009). Appetite City: A Culinary History of New York. New York: North Point Press. ISBN 978-0-86547-692-9.
- Spang, Rebecca L (2003). "Restaurants". In Katz, Solomon H (ed.). Encyclopedia of Food and Culture. Scribner Library of Daily Life. Vol. 3. New York: Charles Scribner’s Sons. ISBN 0-684-80567-7.
- Strong, Roy (2003) [2002]. Feast: A History of Grand Eating. London: Pimlico. ISBN 0-7126-6759-8.
- Symons, Michael (1982). One Continuous Picnic. Adelaide, South Australia: Duck Press. ISBN 0-9593047-0-3.
- Walter, Eugene (2007). "The Gumbo Cult". In O'Neill, Molly (ed.). American Food Writing: An Anthology with Classic Recipes. Library of America. ISBN 978-1-59853-005-6.
