= Adélaïde-Thérèse Feuchère =

French actress

Adélaïde-Thérèse Feuchère, known as Mademoiselle Feuchère (1768 - 1845), was a French actress, active in Paris, Sweden, and Lyon.

== Biography ==
Adélaïde-Thérèse Feuchère was born into a family of actors; her mother and sister were also actresses, engaged at the theater in Lyon. She made her debut at the age of fifteen at the Comédie-Française in Paris during the 1783–1784 season; she performed in comedies such as Les Dehors trompeurs by Louis de Boissy, Zénéide by Louis de Cahusac, and La jeune Indienne by Sébastien-Roch Nicolas de Chamfort. According to Le Censeur dramatique and Le Journal de Paris, her performance was well received. In 1784, she joined the troupe of the Comédie française de Sa Majesté le roi de Suède in Stockholm, where she performed until 1787.

She returned to France in 1787 and was engaged at the theater in Lyon.

In 1790, she met the writer, critic, and gastronome Alexandre Balthazar Laurent Grimod de La Reynière; he dedicated Consolation à Mademoiselle Feuchère to her. They married on an indeterminate date: the marriage is dated to September 4, 1790, according to Gustave Desnoiresterres, who based this on Grimod's correspondence, or June 6, 1812, according to Ned Rival, who consulted notarial records.
