= Les Marmitons =

Gastronomic and social club

Les Marmitons is a gastronomic and social club of gentlemen who have a common interest in fine food, wine and the culinary arts. Through regular gatherings, members gain knowledge and experience in the preparation and presentation of various fine cuisines under the direction a recognized chef invited to lead the event. Les Marmiton is a French phrase meaning "chef's helper" or "kitchen boy."

== History ==
The tradition of a group of gentlemen inviting master chefs to lead them in preparing elaborate meals began in Europe many years ago, and was introduced to North America over thirty years ago by Swiss immigrants.

The word "Marmitons" is French and means a kitchen boy, or chef's helper. The first North American chapter of Les Marmitons was established in Montreal in 1977. Since then, the interest in learning more about fine cuisine has led to the founding of over a dozen additional chapters throughout Canada and the United States. Members of any one chapter are always welcome to attend regular gatherings of any other chapter.

== Activities ==
Each chapter of Les Marmitons holds a minimum of eight regular monthly events each year. These are usually weekday evening gatherings during which members prepare and enjoy a four to six course gastronomic experience under the direction and guidance of an invited chef. Several special events are scheduled during the year, a favorite for many chapters being the December Dinner, a repast prepared by members and then enjoyed by both members and their spouses or guests.

In the spring, with the guidance of the Les Marmitons International Executive, one of the chapters hosts the Annual Event, inviting members of all chapters to a weekend of gastronomie in one of the club cities.

=== Monthly gatherings ===
A typical regular event of Les Marmitons begins around six in the evening as members gather to meet the guest chef and hear the chef explain the gourmet menu created for the evening. Teams of members are then formed and each team assumes the responsibility to prepare one of the courses and to serve it to the members and guest chef.

During preparation, the chef moves throughout the kitchen providing guidance to each team. Team members for one course also have ample opportunity to learn the techniques and special preparation tips for the other courses. Except for some final, finishing touches, the major preparation is completed by 8:30 and, accompanied by a wine that has been selected to complement or enhance each course, members sit to enjoy the fruits of their labor.

During the meal, the preparation and presentation of each course is explained by the team, and the chef provides additional comment and constructive critique. At the end of the meal, the guest chef provides his final summation and members show their appreciation for the creativity, professionalism and freely given time of the chef. A quick clean-up brings the evening to a close about eleven o'clock.

== Membership ==
Members in good standing may invite a guest to attend any of the regular events of the chapter. After having attended three regular monthly events, a prospective member may be eligible to be inducted into Les Marmitons, subject to approval of the executive board.

Upon acceptance for membership, a new member will pay a nominal new member fee to cover the cost of the annual dues as well as the purchase of the Les Marmitons uniform jacket, hat and medallion. Members maintain their good standing by keeping annual dues and event fees current and supporting regulations on safety, appropriate dress and behavior during club events.

== Attire ==
The chef's costume, the jacket and hat, or "toque", are steeped in history and tradition which members honor by dressing appropriately for each regular event and by wearing a Les Marmitons jacket and hat. Members are also required to bring their chef and paring knives to each cooking event.

At the Annual Meeting and other special events, members are required to wear the club jacket, hat and medallion as well as dress pants.

== Comportement ==
The French word "comportement", referring to one's manner or bearing, has special meaning at Les Marmitons. Members share a common desire to cultivate and enjoy the gastronomic and social aspects of the club - and excessive consumption as well as the conducting of commercial business is deemed inappropriate at club events.

== See also ==
- Sumito Estévez
