= Hôtel Grimod de La Reynière =

Historic mansion in Paris

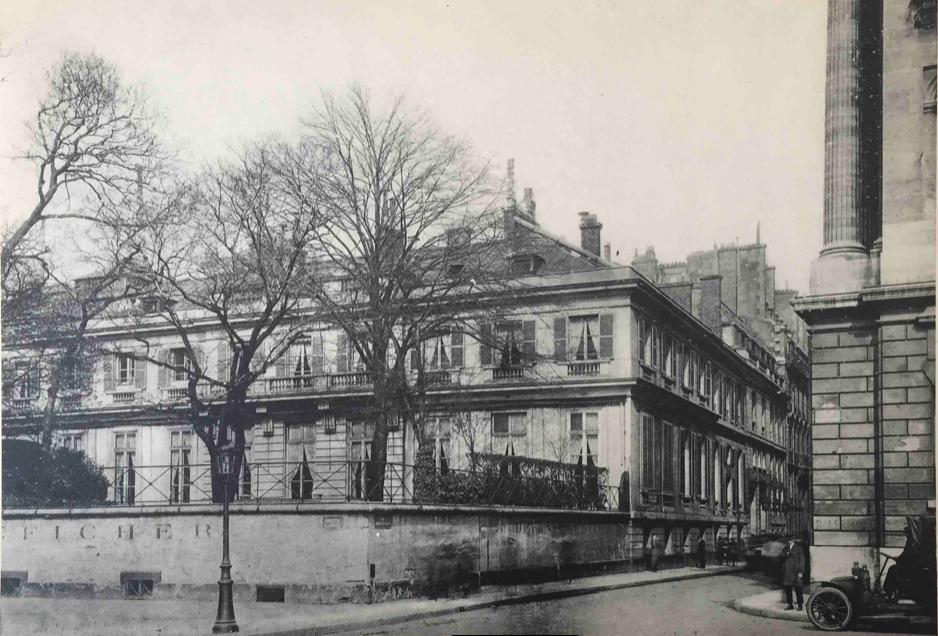
- The building at the beginning of the 20th century
- Interactive map of the Hôtel Grimod de La Reynière area

General information
- Architectural style: Neoclassical
- Location: Paris, France
- Coordinates: 48°52′02″N 2°19′14″E
- Construction started: 1775
- Demolished: 1932
- Client: Laurent Grimod de La Reynière

Design and construction
- Architect: Jean-Benoît-Vincent Barré

The Hôtel Grimod de La Reynière (French pronunciation: [otɛl ɡʁimo də la ʁɛnjɛʁ]) was an hôtel particulier in Paris, in the corner between Avenue Gabriel and Rue Boissy d'Anglas.

== Description ==
The layout of the rooms is known from a relief by the architect Johann Christian Kammsetzer, preserved at Cracow. The grand salon and the state rooms gave onto an English garden spread between the south facade and the gardens of the Champs-Élysées. The dining room was located in the west wing, between two courtyards and a small, oval internal garden, with heating. Two fountains were placed in a gallery between the kitchen and the buffet, a gallery reached through a billiards room and an octagonal hall. On the other side of the main courtyard was a picture gallery and a library, which gave onto Rue de la Bonne-Morue.

In the interior, Charles-Louis Clérisseau and Étienne de La Vallée Poussin executed the first decorative scheme in Europe to be inspired by the new archaeological discoveries at Pompeii and Herculanum. A set of eight painted boiseries depicting sixteen scenes from the life of Achilles were sold in 1850 and are now in the collection of the Victoria and Albert Museum in London.

== History ==
It was built in 1775 in a neo-classical style by Jean-Benoît-Vincent Barré for the fermier général (tax-farmer) Laurent Grimod de La Reynière (1733–1793). It used a plot occupied by a store for ancient statues in the royal collection, on which Grimod de La Reynière had obtained a royal concession to construct a building similar to the Hôtel Saint-Florentin (on the northeastern corner of the Place Louis XV, now Place de la Concorde, designed by Ange-Jacques Gabriel).

Up until the 19th century, the Hôtel housed the Cercle impérial, then the Cercle de l'Union artistique, which held exhibitions by the Society of Watercolourists in 1914. Disfigured by successive additions, it was demolished in 1932 and replaced by a neoclassical pastiche, built between 1931 and 1933 by the architects William Delano and Victor Laloux to house the US embassy.

== Bibliography ==
- Michel Gallet, Les architectes parisiens du XVIIIe siècle, Paris, Éditions Mengès, 1995 – ISBN 2-85620-370-1
