= Smuggling in pre-revolutionary France =

Smuggling in pre-revolutionary France was a reaction to the economic hardships and internal Taxations throughout the country. Though the trade of contraband was lucrative throughout Europe, it was especially so in France and contributed to national tensions. While tobacco was commonly smuggled, common items such as salt and calico were carried across provincial borders to avoid high taxes. The smuggling trade was very profitable, and it allowed families to increase their income while subverting corrupt tax farmers. The prevalence of smuggling and the economic motivations surrounding the trade helped lead France towards revolution.

== Economic factors ==
Several economic factors contributed to the prevalence of smuggling in the second half of the eighteenth century. Of the twenty-six million people in France, twenty-one million worked within the agricultural sector. However, most peasants who owned land held less than twenty acres, enough to support a single family. France strongly relied on its agricultural sector, and this over dependence left the population susceptible to droughts and other natural disasters. Urban peasants faced similar problems, as most of Paris's population served as Manual workers.

The census of 1791 revealed that there were 118,784 paupers, unskilled laborers, and beggars in Paris, about a quarter of the population. Therefore, most of the urban and rural populations were limited to lower-class occupations. There was also economic disparity between the sexes, as a male servant might earn 90 livres a year while a woman earned only 35–50 livres. Peasants dedicated half of their household income to food, leaving little money for other expenses.

== Foreign trade ==
Despite this wealth inequality, French foreign trade was widely successful until the beginning of the revolution, as the sugar trade in the West Indies brought great wealth to France's elite. The monarchy capitalized on this wealth by imposing trade monopolies with its Caribbean colonies. However, the Eden Treaty with England of May 1787 hindered the French manufacturing sector, as the agreement lowered internal tariffs on English goods. This trade agreement outraged French Merchants because they could not compete with British prices. Such Trade agreements contributed to poverty within France and encouraged illicit economic activity.

Smuggling within France was an extremely lucrative business due to high demand for expensive products, specifically tobacco, salt, and calico. Smugglers devised means of subverting the authorities. For example, female smugglers would often stuff salt into their dresses. Smugglers also trained dogs to carry salt, though no records exist on their prevalence or incarceration rates. In addition, many smuggling bands formed; French authorities were aware of at least 38 large smuggling bands in the second half of the eighteenth century. As indirect taxes were uniform throughout France, certain provinces charged vastly more for some items. For example, 49 kilos of salt cost 31 sous in Brittany but 591 sous in Anjoy. Crossing the Loire River, which separated the two territories, became a common means of transporting contraband.

Salt smuggling was particularly problematic for the authorities, as smugglers abused the gabelle, or salt tax. Many provinces mandated that every citizen buy at least seven pounds of salt per year. This salt could only be used for cooking, so many would have been required to buy more. As a result, many relied on purchasing contraband salt to escape these heavy fines. Calico was also a popular contraband item, as the French prized genuine Indian calico. Although calico's prohibition ended in 1759, calico's taxation remained high enough to justify smuggling. France's public monopoly and internal tax system also upset foreigners. Irish lawmaker Edmund Burke stated that the system was "unwisely, with being ill-contrived, [and] oppressive." Burke’s views show an international disapproval of France’s practices and an awareness that smuggling would be the taxes’ unintended consequence.

== Authorities ==
Smuggling posed a significant problem for authorities. French law considered smuggling a direct offense against the King; smugglers avoided paying indirect taxes which composed 47% of the government's income, so it was as if they were stealing from the monarch. Smugglers also undermined the ferme générale, or the "Five Great Farms." This was a tax farming institution which collected and profited off indirect taxes. Therefore, the law dealt harshly with offenders to discourage further smuggling. Punishments for smuggling varied across France's provinces but always worsened with repeat offenses. Offenders were always fined and often served additional time depending on the region. In Provence, smuggling bands of five and larger received fines of 500 livres and served nine years in galleys for a first offense.

The law was especially harsh on nobles who dealt in contraband; commonly, those elites who were caught were stripped of their titles and their houses were razed. The severe punishment of the contraband industry shaped France's prison infrastructure. From 1685 to 1791, over 100,000 men went to the galleys for illegal trade. The government needed to build more prisons to meet demands, and this influx of prisoners would lead the French government to create the modern French prison.

== Increased regulations ==
French authorities also reacted by imposing increased regulations on the business practices and movements of peasants. Officers viewed travelers with suspicion and demanded that merchants show their paperwork to prove the legitimacy of their wares. The government also increased the Farm police to 20,000 guards which became the largest paramilitary force of the time in Europe. They patrolled the river Loire and prohibited fishing at night. Officers would also physically search any suspects. For example, they would squeeze women where salt could be hidden, often the padding within their dresses.

Due to the heightened repression on underground trade, smugglers often played integral roles in inciting armed rebellions against taxation officers. From 1660 to 1789, tax rebellion was the primary form of revolt within France. Notably, these rebellions were larger than the bread riots which propelled the beginning of the French Revolution. The most prominent of these revolts occurred from 11 to 14 July in 1789, when smugglers and common workers destroyed forty customs gates. Occurring before the Storming of the Bastille, this was one of the first demonstrations of popular support for the French Revolution.

== Public support ==
Smugglers garnered large public support, and influential revolutionary figures and liberals defended these rebellions. Mirabeau, a noble and leader of the Revolution, argued that the true antagonist wasn't the smuggling trade but the Farm; he called these men "vampires" who control a system which "bleeds the people at the throat." These smuggler's rebellions also influenced physiocrats, liberal economic supporters for fair trade; they advocated for a completely altered fiscal system which replaced taxes on goods with other taxes. Others such as the President of the Paris "Cour des Aides" Malesherbes asserted in 1775 that this crime didn't warrant such severe punishment. He argued that the King could resolve this form of despotism by calling the Estates General, an institution last seen in 1614. Louis XVI would form the Estates General four years later.
