= One Continuous Picnic =

Nonfiction book by Michael Symons

- Author: Michael Symons
- Publisher: Duck Press
- Publication date: 1982
- Publication place: Adelaide, South Australia
- ISBN: 0-9593047-0-3

One Continuous Picnic: A History of Eating in Australia is a 1982 non-fiction book by the journalist and restauranteur Michael Symons, published by Duck Press, Adelaide.

== Contents ==
One Continuous Picnic was an early account of the development of Australian cuisine, published at a time when food history was becoming established as a field. It was preceded by the 1978 book The Tradition of Australian Cooking by Anne Gollan, with both identifying three, overlapping stages of the cuisine's evolution. For Symon, the first took place between 1788, the start of the British colonial period, through the 1860s, when growing and raising plants and animals became industrialised. In the second stage, which lasted until the 1930s, food processing and sale became industrialised. Finally, from the 1930s, cooking became industrialised as restaurants and factories took over the role of making goods such as convenience foods.

Symons is very critical of the development of Australia's cuisine. He credits this to Australia's colonisation in the late 19th century, meaning the country never had an agrarian peasantry. Symons writes, "There has never been the creative interplay between society and the soil … almost no food has ever been grown by the person who eats it, almost no food preserved in the home … Our history is without peasants". Such a view was influenced by time he had spent in Tuscany. For Symons, the food content in women's magazines also had a negative role. These had feminised cookery in Australia, to its detriment.

== Reception ==
One Continuous Picnic was very influential. Paul van Reyk writes that with the publication of One Continuous Picnic, Symons "birthed gastronomy in Australia", and writing in 2011, Colin Bannerman called One Continuous Picnic still "the dominant historical account of eating in Australia".

The book's thesis has been controversial. Other factors have been identified, and indeed Symons elaborated on his materialist account in 1993, in The Shared Table: Ideas for Australian Cuisine, describing multiculturalism as particularly influential. Gallegos and Newman ask in response to both: "What about the women?" They describe Symons' as a "an essentially masculinist history, a pessimistic derogatory view giving little value to domestic traditions passed from mother to daughter".

== Sources ==
- Bannerman, Colin (1998). Acquired Tastes: Celebrating Australia's Culinary History. Canberra, ACT: National Library of Australia. ISBN 0-642-10693-2.
- Bannerman, Colin (November 2011). "Making Australian Food History". Australian Humanities Review (51).
- Gallegos, Danielle; Newman, Felicity (1999). "What about the Women? Food, Migration and Mythology". M/C Journal. 2 (7). doi:10.5204/mcj.1798.
- Kingston, Beverley (1998). "Food". In Davison, Graeme; Hirst, John; Macintyre, Stuart (eds.). The Oxford Companion to Australian History. Melbourne & New York, London: Oxford University Press. ISBN 0-19-553597-9.
- Kirkby, Diane; Luckins, Tanja; Santich, Barbara (2007). "Introduction: Of Turtles, Dining and the Importance of History in Food, Food in History". In Kirkby, Diane Elizabeth; Luckins, Tanja (eds.). Dining on Turtles: Food Feasts and Drinking in History. New York, London: Palgrave Macmillan. ISBN 978-0-230-51715-8.
- Luckins, Tanja (August 2013). "Historiographic Foodways: A Survey of Food and Drink Histories in Australia". History Compass. 11 (8). doi:10.1111/hic3.12071.
- Newton, John (2018). The Getting of Garlic: Australian Food from Bland to Brilliant, with Recipes Old and New. Sydney, New South Wales: University of New South Wales Press.
- Symons, Michael (1982). One Continuous Picnic: A History of Eating in Australia. Adelaide: Duck Press.
- van Reyk, Paul (2021). True to the Land: A History of Food in Australia. London: Reaktion Books. ISBN 978-1-78914-406-2.
