= Sumito Estévez =

Venezuelan chef (born 1965)

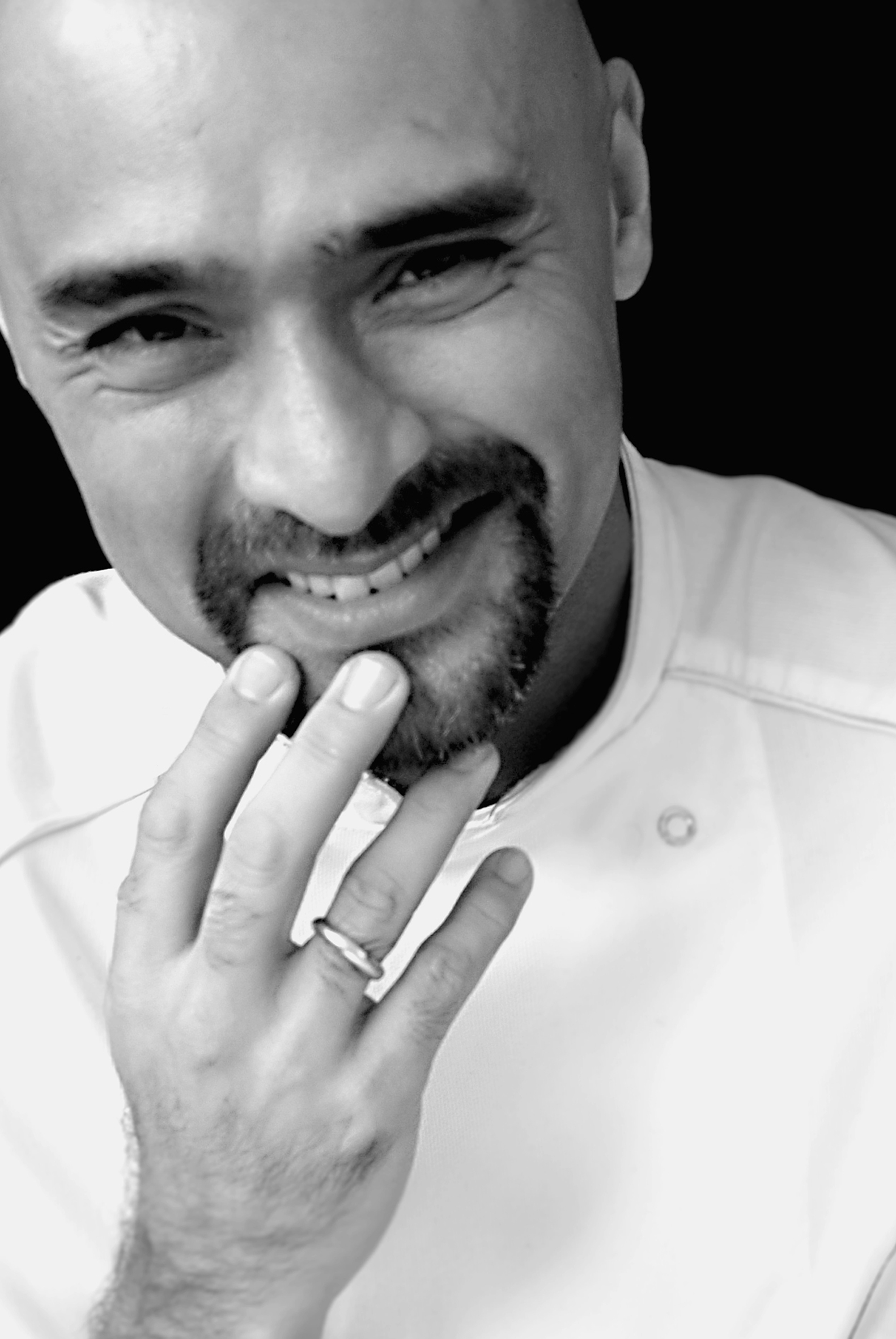
Sumito Estévez

Sumito Estévez Singh (born 22 October 1965 in Mérida, Venezuela) is a Venezuelan chef, writer, entrepreneur, educator and television personality.

== Career ==
He is one of the most recognized Venezuelan chefs in both Venezuela and abroad and one of the most renowned Venezuelans in general. Together with the chef Héctor Romero, Estévez founded the Instituto Culinario de Caracas, and has interests in commercial establishments in that city as well as abroad.

Estévez is also the conductor of culinary television programs, radio programs and has written articles and columns for several newspapers in Venezuela. Among his many occupations, he has been a judge and creator of culinary festivals.

Between 1998 and 2001, the newspaper El Nacional published two volumes with his recipes. In 2005, the same publisher extended its bibliography with the edition of fifteen volumes of La Cocina de Sumito, the gastronomic collection of greater tiraje published in Venezuela.

== Family and early life ==
He is the son of the marriage between the Venezuelan physicist Raúl Estévez and Anusuya Singh, of Punjabi origin.

His father graduated in the first promotion of the Patricio Lumumba University in the Soviet Union of Moscow and studied for a master's and a doctorate in the Stanford University in the United States. His father was one of the founders of the Faculty of Sciences of the University of the Andes (Universidad de Los Andes).

His paternal grandmother, María Laprea, was the second wife of Aquiles Nazoa after they both became widowed; they were married in 1949. Nazoa's previous wife had been Estrella Fernández-Viña Martí (granddaughter of the Cuban José Martí) who died of tuberculosis shortly after the marriage.

Estévez is the nephew of the chef and comedian Claudio Nazoa, who is the son of Laprea, and has a sister named Swapna Puni Estévez Singh, who is a psycho-pedagogue.

His maternal grandfather was Sri Gurbaksh Singh, writer in Punjabi and founder of Prit Nágar, a town in northern India.

Estévez lived between India and Venezuela during his childhood. From childhood, he had a taste for gastronomy. At the age of 14, he founded a gastronomic "club" with the filmmaker Alberto Arvelo. For three years, they dedicated themselves to selecting countries, reading about them and experimenting with their cuisine on Saturdays. Eventually, the group became thirty members.
