= Grimod de La Reynière =

French lawyer and food writer (1758–1837)

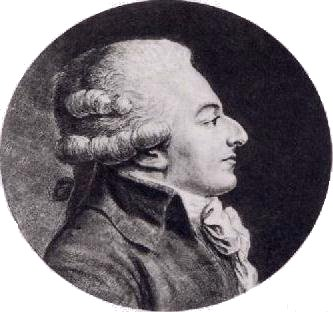
Grimod de La Reynière

Alexandre-Balthazar-Laurent Grimod de La Reynière (20 November [or September?] 1758 in Paris – 25 December 1837), commonly called Grimod, was a gastronome and gastronomic writer.

Son of Laurent Grimod de La Reynière, he inherited the family fortune on the death of his father, a fermier général, in 1793. He was a member of the Société du Caveau.

== Biography ==
Though his father built a stylish house in Paris with a garden that looked onto the bosquets of the Champs-Élysées and kept a great table, the younger Grimod had been born with deformed hands and was kept out of sight, a circumstance that developed his biting wit and dark sense of humour. The younger Grimod de La Reynière began his public career on his return from studies in Lausanne by collaborating in the review Journal des théâtres in 1777–78, continuing to write reviews of theatre, some of which he published himself, as Le Censeur Dramatique.

During his parents' absence he gave grand dinner parties in the Hôtel Grimod de La Reynière, at one of which his father returned suddenly to find a pig dressed up and presiding at the table. The story made the rounds in Paris, and a breach with the family ensued, which culminated in a lettre de cachet that disinherited him and confined him to an abbey close to Nancy, where at the table of the father abbot he began to learn the art of good eating. He was a correspondent to the scandal chronicle, Correspondence secrète, politique et littéraire (1790) relating to Paris during the reign of Louis XVI, and formed a liaison with the actress Adèle Feuchère, who bore their child in 1790.

Supported with a little money from his family, he had the idea of buying food directly from the producer, and selling it in a shop at a set price; to make a living, he opened a shop in Lyon selling groceries, tools and other exotic commodities. When he regained his liberty upon the death of his father in 1792, he returned to Paris and spread the activities of his "société Grimod et Cie", opening shops in other French cities. He reconciled with his mother, who was saved from the guillotine through his connections, and began a series of mock-funeral dinners.

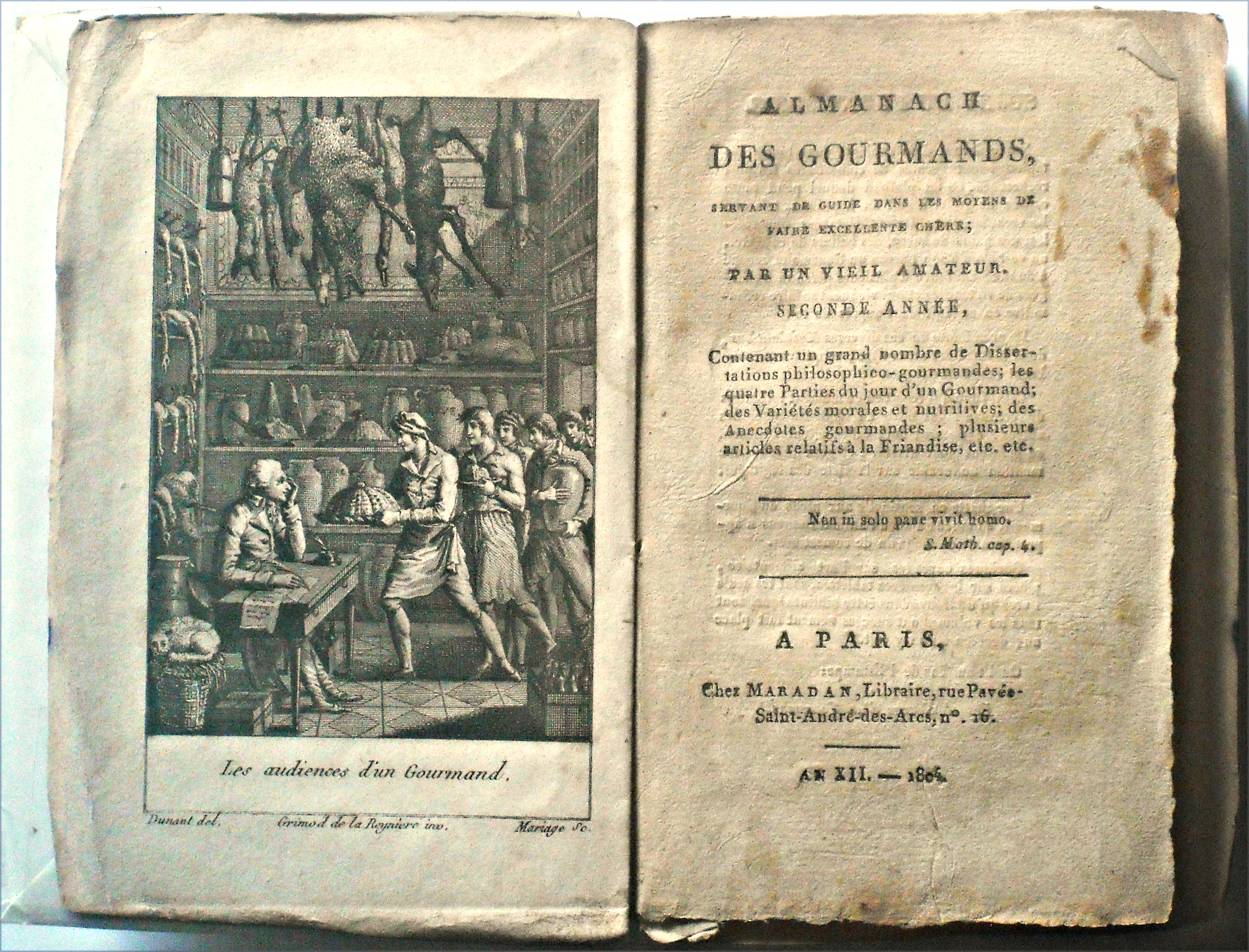
First page of Almanach des Gourmands by Grimod de La Reynière, 2nd year

He was the first public critic of cooking, and the first reviewer of the ambitious restaurants that had cropped up in Paris in the late 18th century and flowered under the Napoleonic regime. He is often compared to the noted gastronome Brillat-Savarin,and is regarded as a rich source of quotations in French gastronomic literature through the eight volumes of his annual L'Almanach des gourmands, which he edited and published from 1803 to 1812. Gourmand still retained its sense of "gluttony", one of the Seven Deadly Sins, and Grimod's choice of the word, when "friand" more usually connoted a connoisseur of fine food and wine, was a conscious one and wholly in character. Gourmand and gourmet first achieved their pleasant modern connotations in Grimod's Almanachs, which, among other innovations, were the first restaurant guides. The success of the Almanachs encouraged Grimod and his publishers to bring out the monthly Journal des Gourmandes et des Belles, which appeared for the first time in January 1806.

Its editorial board consisted of the friends who met weekly for dinner at the Hôtel Grimod de La Reynière, those "Dîners du Vaudeville", composed of dishes sent round by the premier restaurants of Paris for judgment, and Grimod as host and presiding genius. His Manuel des amphitryons (Hosts) appeared in 1808. Sainte-Beuve called him the "Father of the table".

He inherited the family fortune at the death of his mother in 1812, married his devoted mistress, gave his own funeral to see who would come, then retired to the Château de Villiers-sur-Orge, near Paris. Grimod de La Reynière died on Christmas Day 1837, aged 79.

== Literature and Impact ==
Pascal Ory considers Alexandre Grimod to be "one of the founders of the modern French culture," grouping him with the Comte de Saint-Simon and Alexis de Tocqueville. He "reestablished order, hierarchy, and distinctions in the realm of good taste" through the publication of texts that helped to define the French food scene.

While other critics focused on art, literature and drama, Grimod introduced the criticism of food and cookery, inventing the gastronomic guidebook (Almanach des Gourmands), the gastronomic treatise (Manuel des Amphitryons), and the gourmet periodical (Journal des Gourmands et des Belles). There was literature about food and eating before Grimod, but it was concerned only with technical aspects and recipes, while Grimod introduced the idea of epicurean criticism.

== Works ==
- Alexandre Balthazar Laurent Grimod de La Reynière, Almanach des gourmands, Ed. Mercure de France, coll. Le Petit Mercure, 1 April 2003; (ISBN 2-7152-2404-4) online version
- Alexandre Balthazar Laurent Grimod de La Reynière, Manuel des amphitryons, (1808) Ed. Métailié, 23 November 1995; (ISBN 2-86424-025-4 ) A condensation of material from his Almanach. online version
