= Laurent Grimod de La Reynière =

French financier (1734-1973)

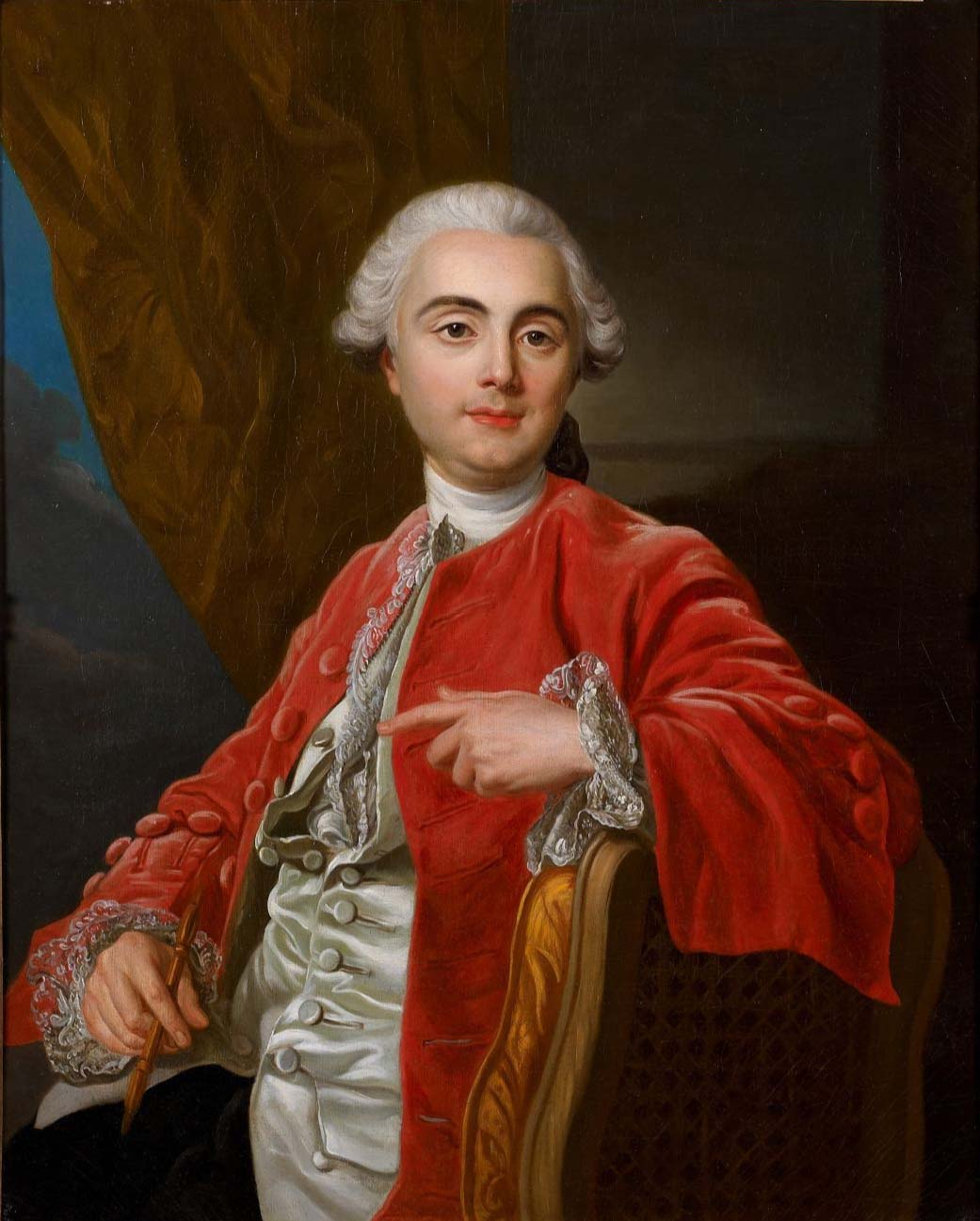
- Born: 1734
- Died: 1793 (aged 58–59); France
- Occupation: Financier

Laurent Grimod de La Reynière (11 February 1734 – 26 December 1793) was a French financier and fermier général. He was the son of Antoine-(Gaspard) Grimod, seigneur de La Reynière (1690 – 9 February 1754), another fermier général, and his third wife Marie-Madeleine Mazard (28 May 1716 – 23 February 1773), of whom a pastel portrait was executed by Maurice-(Quentin) de La Tour in 1751.

He was the husband of Françoise-(Elisabeth) de Jarente (the niece of the bishop of Orléans), whom he married on 1 February 1753. They were the parents of the famous French gastronome and author Alexandre Balthazar Laurent Grimod de La Reynière (1758–1837).

In 1775, he had the hôtel Grimod de La Reynière constructed in Paris in the corner between Avenue Gabriel and Rue Boissy d'Anglas. The architect was Jean-Benoît-Vincent Barré, and the painter Charles-Louis Clérisseau produced its interior decorative scheme, the first in Europe to be based on the archaeological discoveries at Pompeii and Herculanum.
