= Gourmand =

Person who takes great pleasure and interest in consuming good food and drink

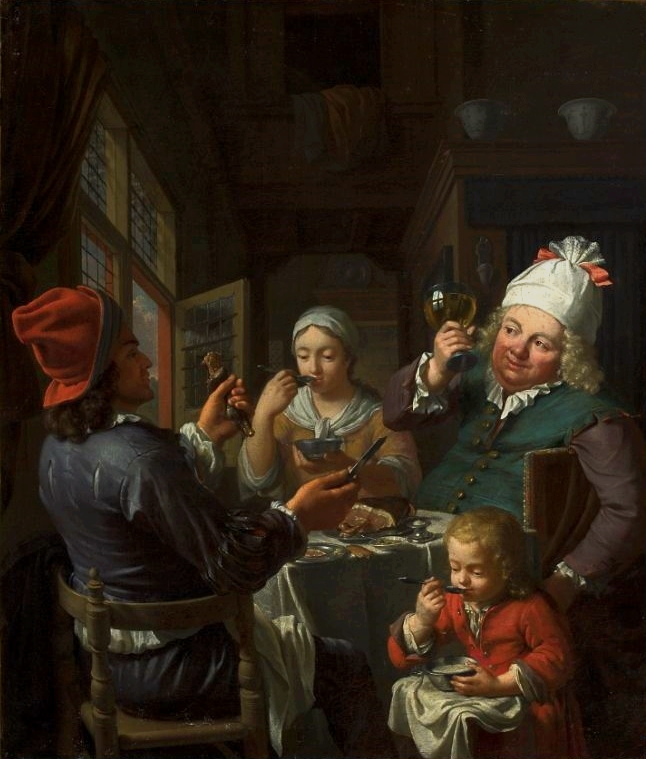
Gourmands by Krzysztof Lubieniecki, National Museum in Warsaw

A gourmand is a person who takes great pleasure and interest in consuming particularly good food and drink. Gourmand originally referred to a person who was "a glutton for food and drink", a person who eats and drinks excessively.

== Etymology ==
Gourmand was derived from a French word that has different connotations from the similar word gourmet, which emphasizes an individual with a refined, discerning palate and is more often applied to the preparer than the consumer of the food. But in practice, the two terms are closely linked, as both imply the enjoyment of good food. In his book Alamanach de las Gourmands, Grimod De la Reynière wrote that a gourmand is not only a person endowed with an excellent stomach and strong appetite, but also adds to these advantages a delight taste. Reynière concluded that the first principle lies in a single delicate palate, matured with a long experience. The French Academy dictionary suggested that the term 'gourmand' was a synonym of 'glutton' or 'greedy'.

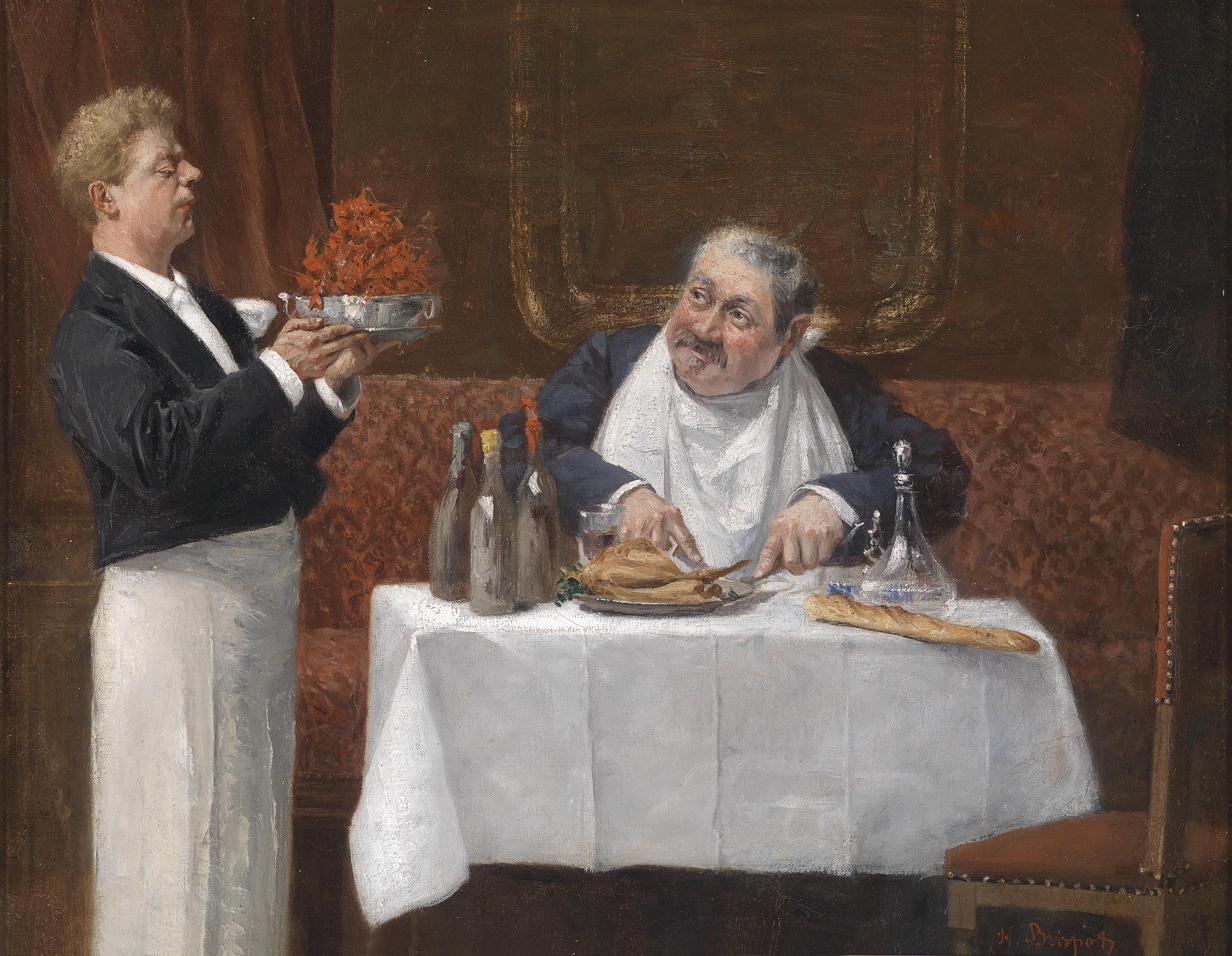
Henri Brispot's A gourmand

An alternative and older usage of the word is to describe a person given to excess in the consumption of food and drink, as a glutton or a trencherman.

Regarding the latter usage of the term, there is a parallel concern among the French people that their word for the appreciation of gourmet cuisine gourmandise is historically included in the French Catholic list of the seven deadly sins. In 2003, given the evolution in the meaning of gourmand (and gourmandise) away from gluttony and towards the connoisseur appreciation of good food, French culinary proponents petitioned the Catholic Church to update said list to refer to gloutonnerie rather than gourmandise.

Another alternative use has gained popularity among perfume and cologne designers. In this field, gourmand refers not to a person but to a category of scents related to foods, such as cocoa, apple, and plum.

== See also ==
- Ligue des Gourmands, founded by Auguste Escoffier in 1912
- An epicure or epicurean (lower-case) is one who pursues fine food and other pleasures, sometimes with overtones of excessive refinement; an Epicurean (capitalized) is one who follows Epicureanism, a system of philosophy developed by Epicurus.
