= Place des Palais =

Square in Brussels, Belgium

Place des Palais (French); Paleizenplein (Dutch)
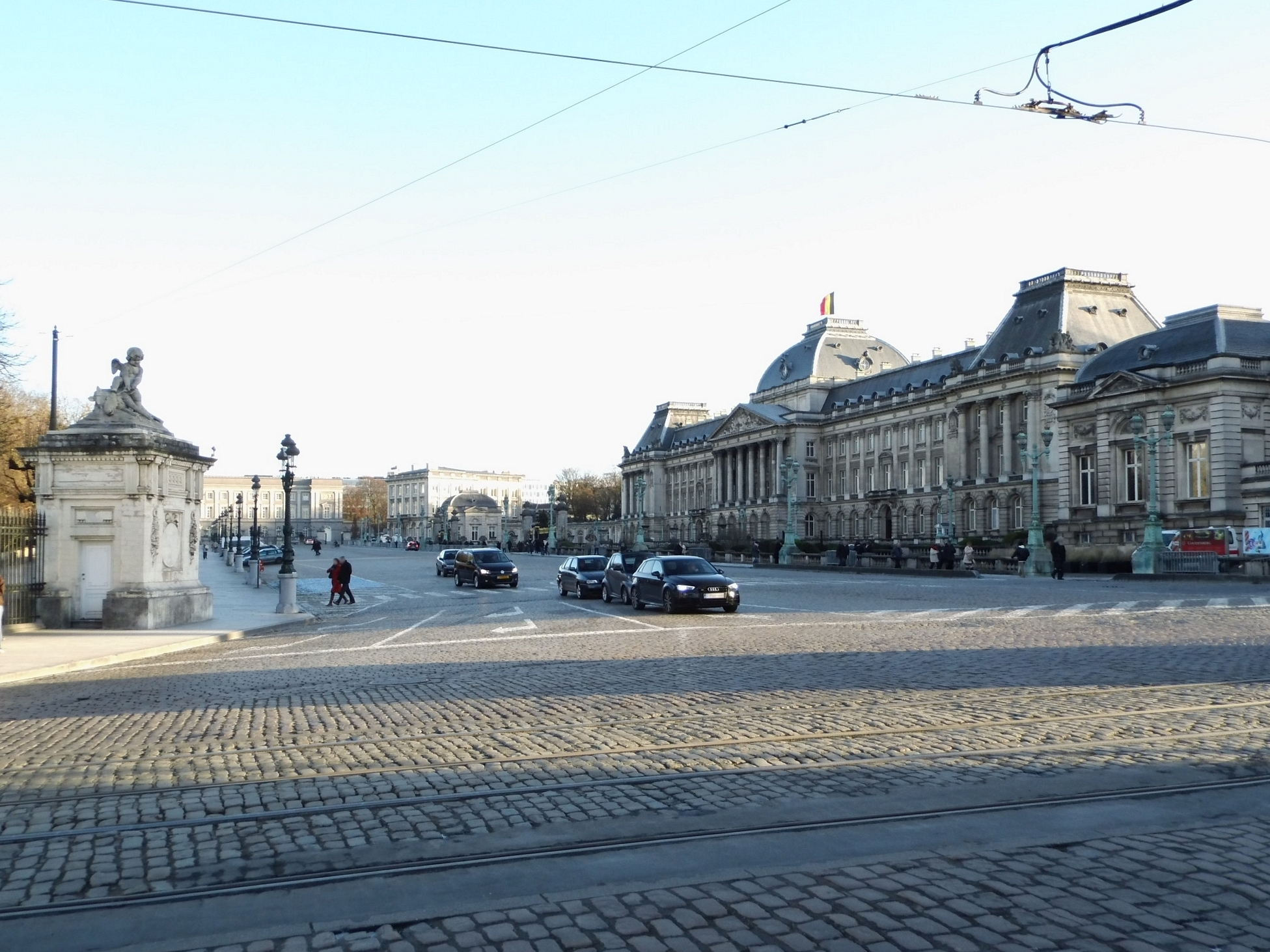
- The Place des Palais/Paleizenplein, with the Royal Palace of Brussels on the right

- Location within Brussels Location within Belgium
- Type: Square
- Length: 350 m (1,150 ft)
- Width: 70 m (230 ft)
- Location: City of Brussels, Brussels-Capital Region, Belgium
- Quarter: Royal Quarter
- Postal code: 1000
- Nearest metro station: 1 5 Parc/Park and 2 6 Trône/Troon
- Coordinates: 50°50′34″N 04°21′45″E

Construction
- Inauguration: 1827

The Place des Palais (French, pronounced [plas de pa.lɛ]) or Paleizenplein (Dutch, pronounced [paːˈlɛizə(m)ˌplɛin]), meaning "Palaces' Square", is a major square in the Royal Quarter of Brussels, Belgium. Created in 1827, it is, along with the Rue de la Loi/Wetstraat, the Rue Ducale/Hertogstraat and the Rue Royale/Koningsstraat, one of the four thoroughfares surrounding Brussels Park. The square measures 70 by 350 metres (230 by 1,150 ft) and is entirely paved.

The Place des Palais is flanked by Brussels Park to the north, the Royal Palace of Brussels to the south, the Academy Palace to the east and the BELvue Museum to the west. This area is served by Brussels-Central railway station, as well as by the metro stations Parc/Park (on lines 1 and 5) and Trône/Troon (on lines 2 and 6).

== History ==
=== Early history ===
The history of the Place des Palais is inseparable from that of the Royal Palace. Originally, the place was a valley dug by a stream, the Koperbeek, which separated the former Palace of Coudenberg (a very old palatial complex that dated back to the Middle Ages) from the Warande (game reserve). After the palace burned down in 1731, the area remained abandoned until the development of the current Brussels Park. From 1776, several arteries were laid out around the park, one of which, the Rue de Belle-Vue, was the origin of the Place des Palais. To do this, part of the valley had to be filled in.

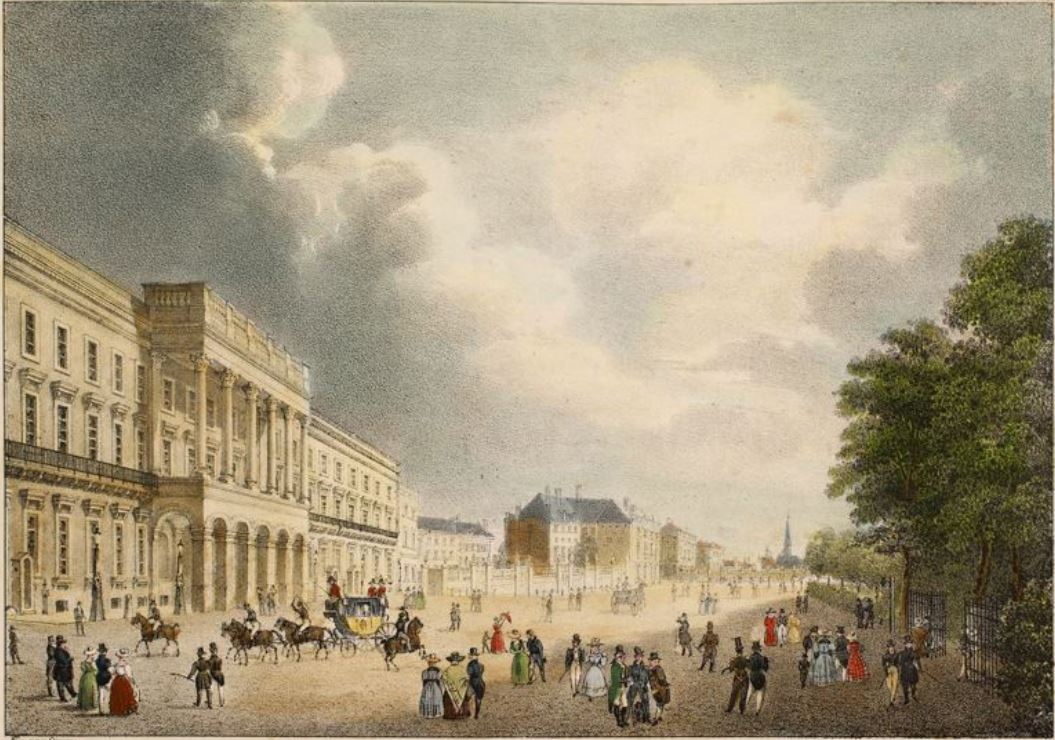
The Place des Palais/Paleizenplein before the square's expansion, c. 1830

The Rue de Belle-Vue was a narrower street than the current square and ended with a bend at each end. It owed its name, meaning "Beautiful View Street", to the panoramic view it offered westwards towards the city. After the definitive location of the new Royal Palace was decided in 1827, the square was renamed the Place des Palais ("Palaces' Square"). The new square's name uses the plural form because another palace, the Academy Palace, was built on the left side of the Royal Palace.

=== Later development ===
Despite subsequent developments, Brussels still lacked a royal palace worthy of the name, so in 1904, King Leopold II, who was dissatisfied with this situation, decided to completely transform it. On that occasion, in order to create a formal front garden with gilded railings, gates and balustrades, separating the palace from the square, the Place des Palais was widened at the expense of Brussels Park, whose lowlands were partially filled in, giving the square its current rectilinear appearance.

Since the disappearance of the tramway tracks that used to run through the Place des Palais, many bus lines now cross the square; they are diverted when important events take place there (see below).

== Places of interest ==
=== Royal Palace ===
The most important building on the Place des Palais, occupying its entire southern side, is the Royal Palace, the official palace of the King and Queen of the Belgians (not to be confused with the Royal Palace of Laeken, the official home of the Belgian royal family). The first nucleus of the present-day building dates from the end of the 18th century. However, the grounds on which the Royal Palace stands were once part of the Palace of Coudenberg. The existing façade was only built after 1900 on the initiative of King Leopold II.

=== Brussels Park ===
On the opposite side of the square lies Brussels Park. This rectangular park, measuring more than 13 ha (32 acres), contains around sixty sculptures, primarily inspired by Greco-Roman mythology; two water basins with fountains; monumental neoclassical railings and gates; as well as two bandstands where numerous shows take place in the summer. The park's middle axis marks both the middle peristyle of the Royal Palace and of the Belgian Federal Parliament building (Palace of the Nation) on the other side of the park. The two facing buildings are said to symbolise Belgium's system of government: a constitutional monarchy.

=== Other buildings ===
At the eastern end of the square is the Academy Palace, a neoclassical palace originally built between 1823 and 1828 for Prince William II of Orange. Nowadays, it houses five Belgian academies including the Royal Academies for Science and the Arts of Belgium (RASAB). In English, it is also sometimes called the Academy House.

At the western end is the former Hôtel Belle-Vue, a corner pavilion built in 1776–77 by Philippe de Proft to install a luxury hotel. It is currently occupied by the BELvue Museum.

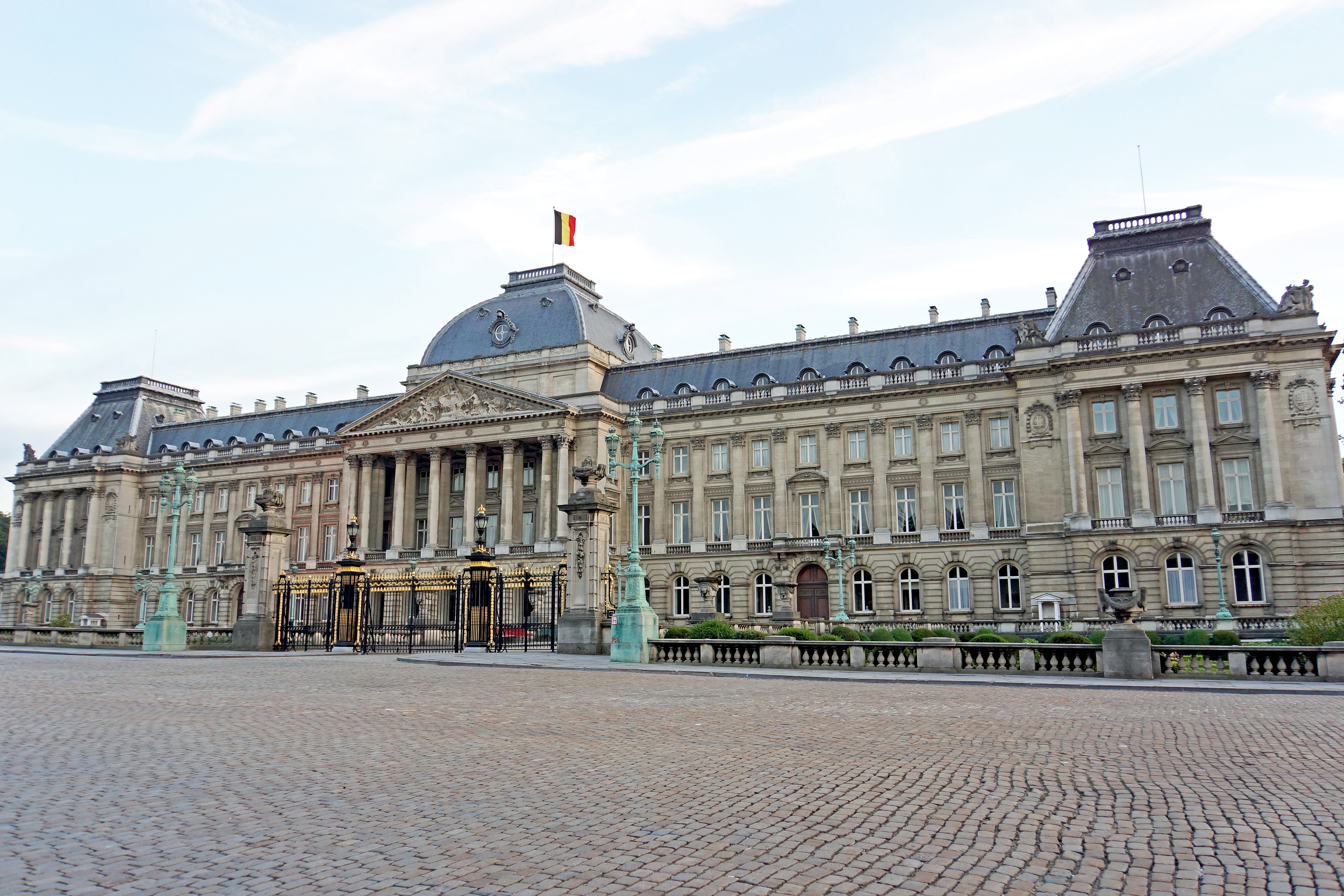
Royal Palace

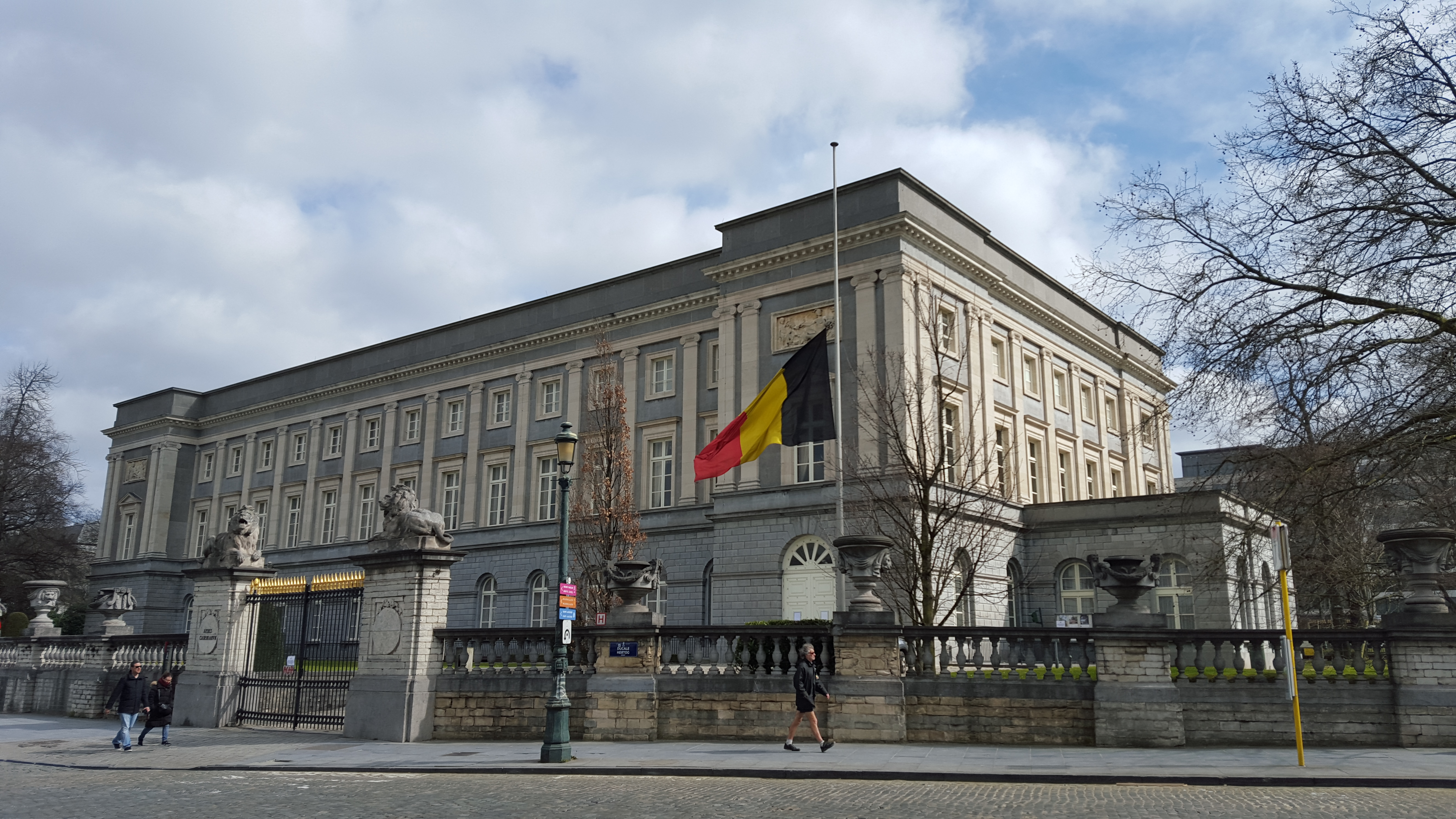
Academy Palace

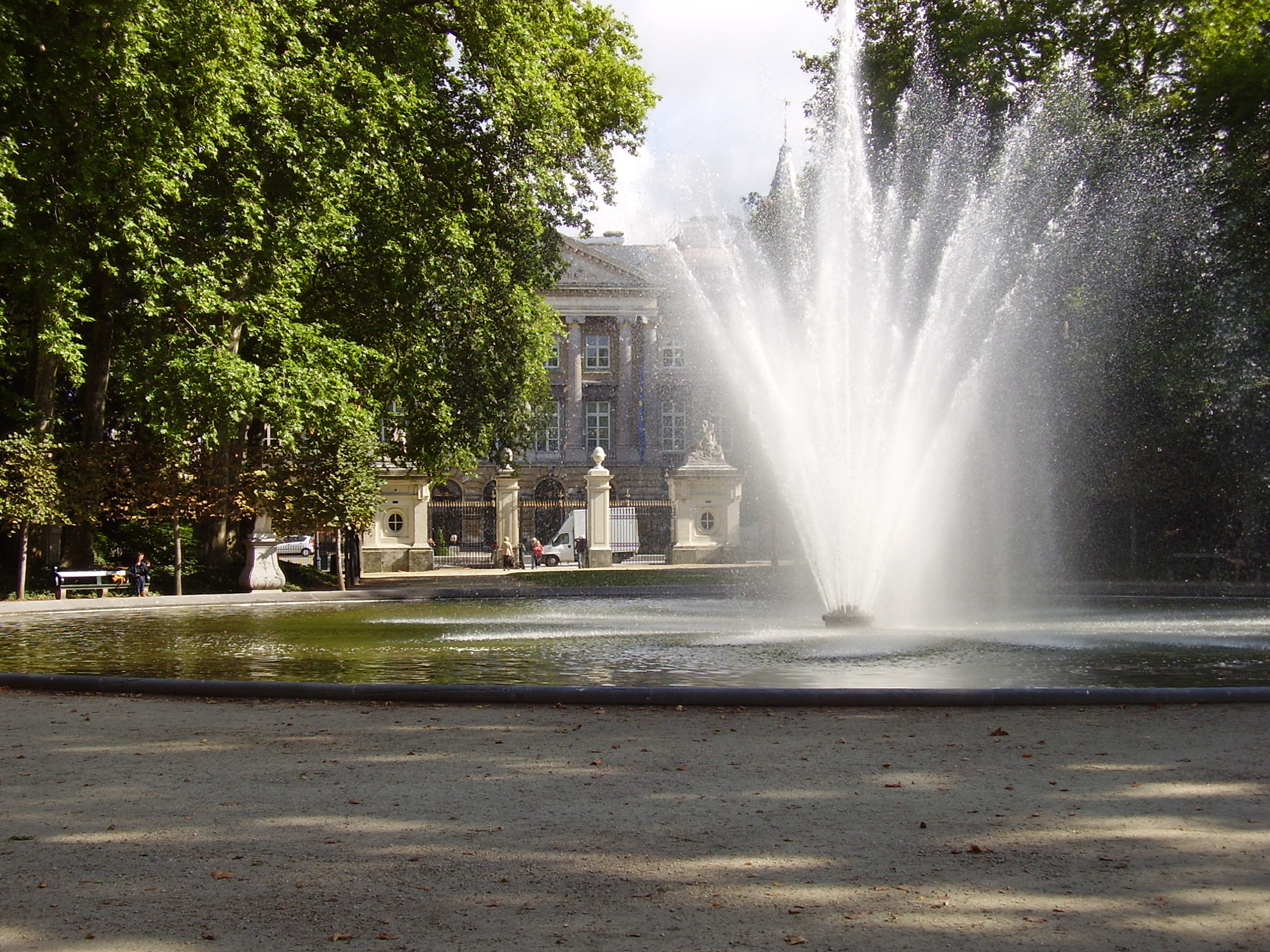
Brussels Park

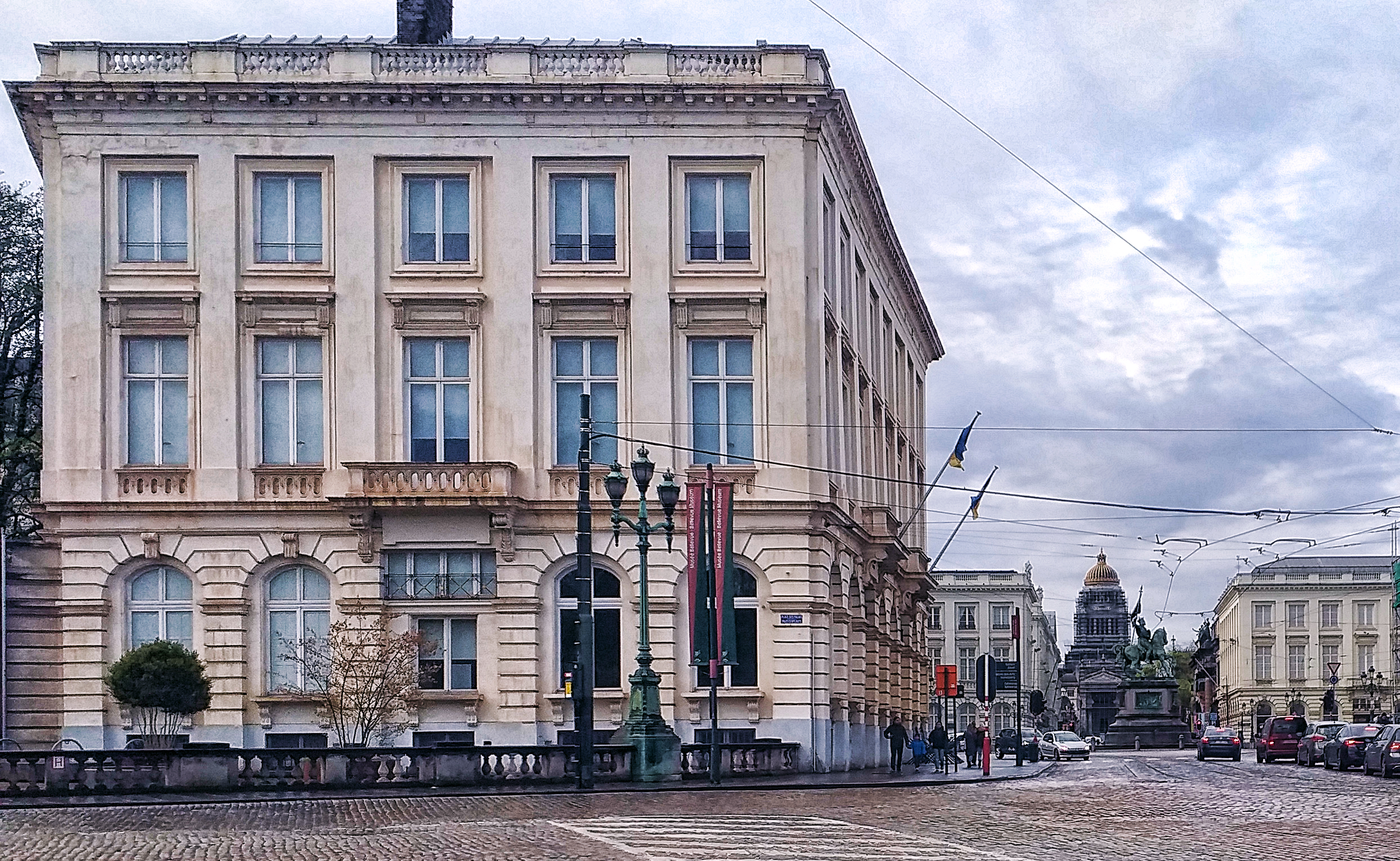
BELvue Museum

== Events ==
Due to both its size and its privileged location opposite the Royal Palace, the Place des Palais lends itself to holding official ceremonies. On Belgian National Day, on 21 July, a military parade and celebrations take place on the square and in Brussels Park, attended by the royal family, the constituted bodies and the diplomatic corps, and ending with a fireworks display in the evening.

The Place des Palais is also remembered as an exceptional place of mourning. From 1 August 1993, the square experienced an unusual crowd following the announcement of the death of King Baudouin. On 5 August, the square saw a record attendance: between 100,000 and 200,000 people flocked there throughout the day to pay their last respects to the king's remains on display at the Royal Palace.

Although not initially intended for events, the Place des Palais has also become a festive venue. It hosts concerts during the French Community Day, the Iris Festival, Bucolic Brussels, and the Fête de la Musique. In summer, the square is animated by the Brussels Summer Festival (BSF). In 2010, the 97th Tour de France peloton departed from the Place des Palais for a 10 km (6.2 mi) circuit through Brussels.

== See also ==
- Neoclassical architecture in Belgium
- History of Brussels
- Belgium in the long nineteenth century
