= Royal Palace of Brussels =

Palace in Brussels, Belgium

- Palais royal de Bruxelles (French); Koninklijk Paleis van Brussel (Dutch); Königlicher Palast von Brüssel (German)
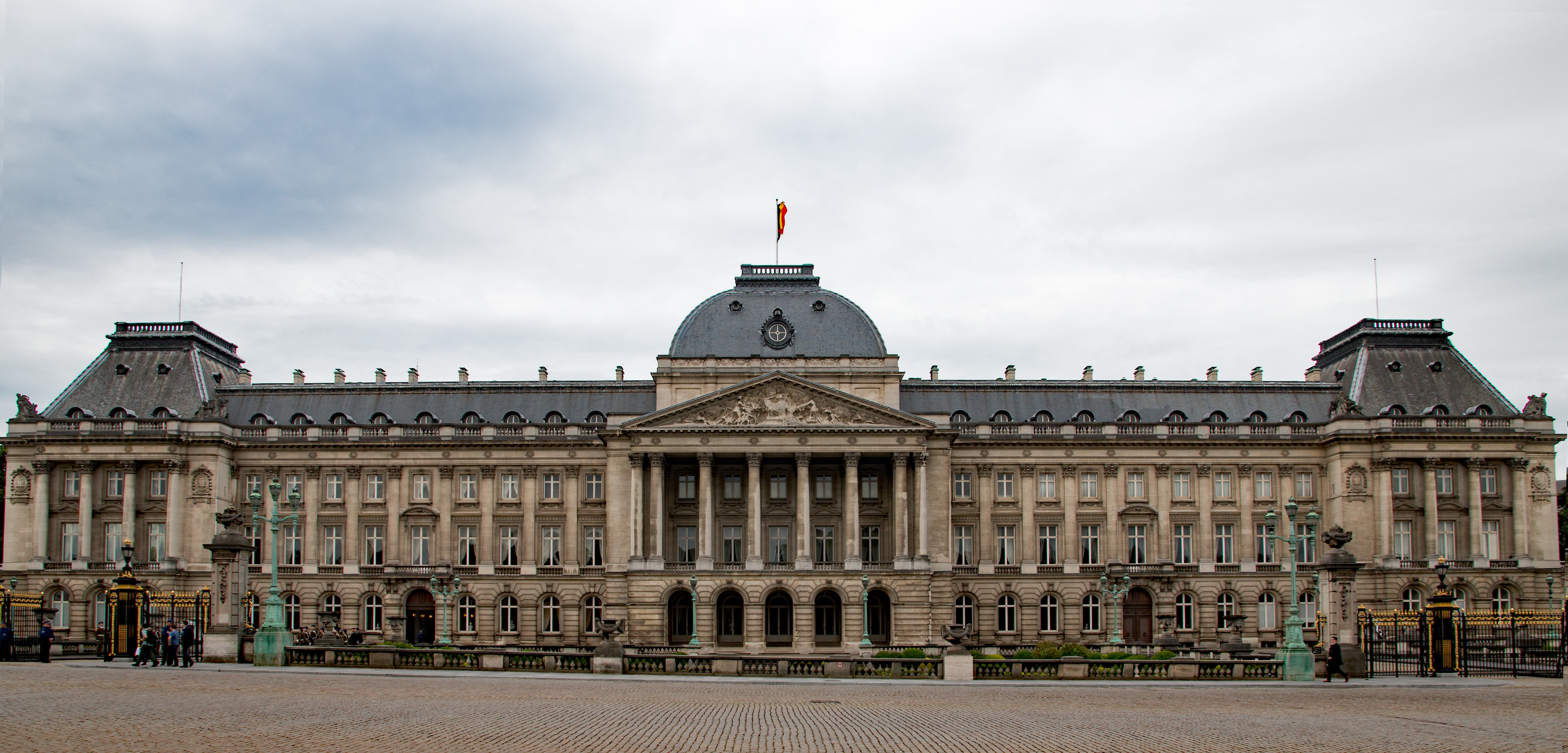
- The Royal Palace of Brussels seen from the Place des Palais/Paleizenplein

General information
- Type: Palace
- Architectural style: Neoclassical
- Location: Place des Palais / Paleizenplein, 1000 City of Brussels, Brussels-Capital Region, Belgium
- Coordinates: 50°50′30″N 04°21′44″E
- Current tenants: Belgian royal family
- Construction started: 1783
- Completed: 1934
- Client: King Leopold II
- Owner: Belgian state

Technical details
- Floor area: 33,027 m^{2} (355,500 sq ft)

Design and construction
- Architects: 1818–1820: Ghislain-Joseph Henry; 1820–1825: Charles Vander Straeten; 1825–1829: Tilman-François Suys; 1868: Alphonse Balat; 1903: Henri Maquet; 1930–1934: Octave Flanneau
- Other designers: François Rude, Jan Fabre

Other information
- Public transit: Brussels-Central; 1 5 Parc/Park and 2 6 Trône/Troon

Website
- www.monarchie.be/en

The Royal Palace of Brussels (French: Palais royal de Bruxelles [palɛ ʁwajal də bʁysɛl]; Dutch: Koninklijk Paleis van Brussel [ˈkoːnɪŋklək paːˈlɛis fɑm ˈbrʏsəl]; (Note: In isolation, van is pronounced [vɑn].) German: Königlicher Palast von Brüssel [ˈkøːnɪklɪçɐ paˈlast fɔn ˈbʁʏsl̩]) is the official palace of the King and Queen of the Belgians in the centre of the nation's capital, Brussels. However, it is not used as a royal residence, as the king and his family live in the Royal Palace of Laeken in northern Brussels. The website of the Belgian Monarchy describes the function of the Royal Palace as follows:

The Royal Palace is where His Majesty the King exercises his prerogatives as Head of State, grants audiences and deals with affairs of state. Apart from the offices of the King and the Queen, the Royal Palace houses the services of the Grand Marshal of the Court, the King's Head of Cabinet, the Head of the King's Military Household and the Intendant of the King's Civil List. The Royal Palace also includes the State Rooms where large receptions are held, as well as the apartments provided for foreign Heads of State during official visits.

The first nucleus of the present-day building dates from the end of the 18th century. However, the grounds on which the Royal Palace stands were once part of the Palace of Coudenberg, a very old palatial complex that dated back to the Middle Ages. The existing façade was only built after 1900 on the initiative of King Leopold II.

The Royal Palace is situated in front of Brussels Park, from which it is separated by a long square called the Place des Palais/Paleizenplein.

== History ==
=== Palace of Coudenberg ===
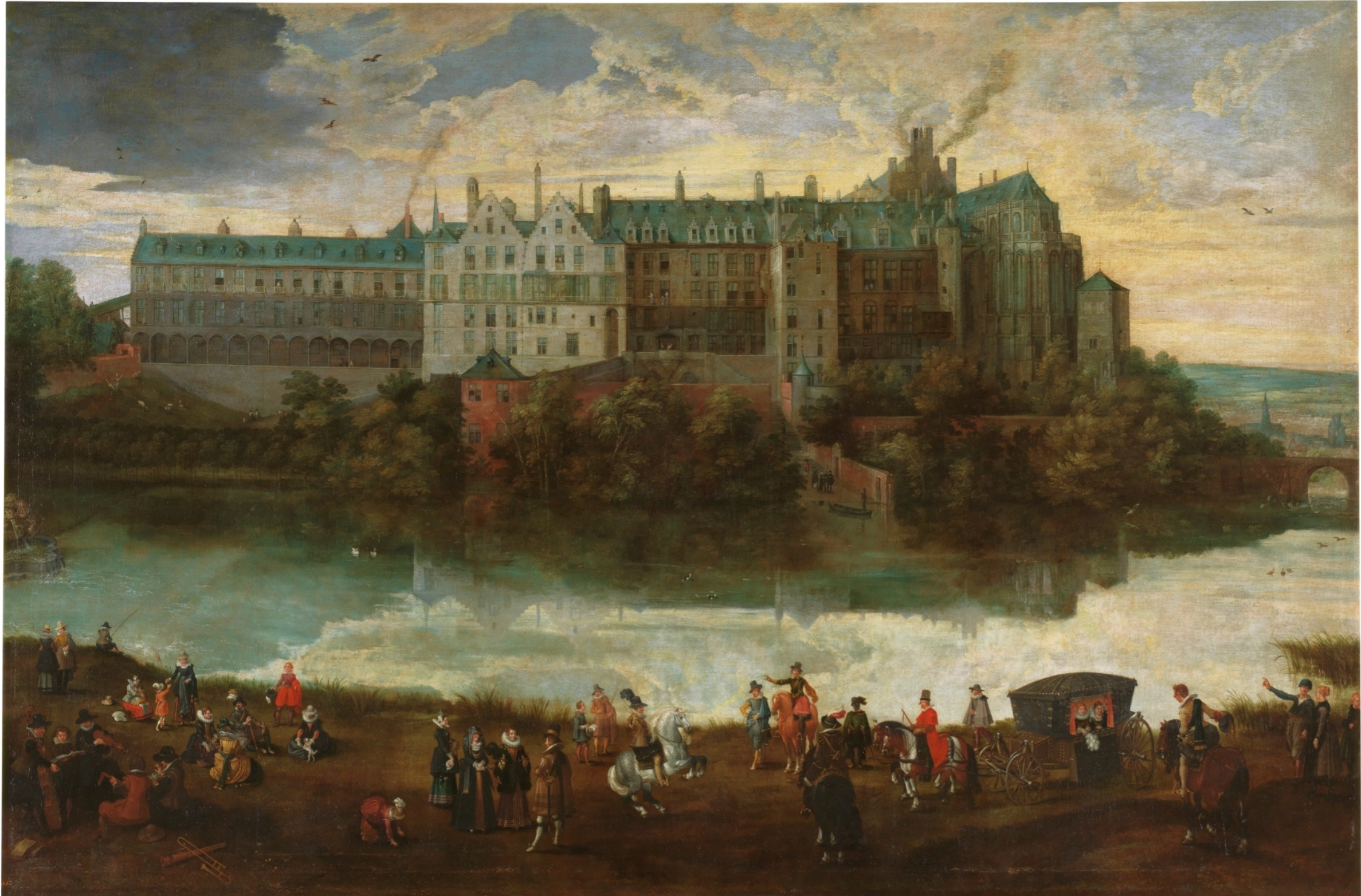
The Royal Palace in Brussels, Peter Brueghel the Younger and Sebastian Vrancx, c. 1627

The first building on the Coudenberg hill was constructed between the second half of the 11th and first half of the 12th century. At that time, it probably looked like a fortified castle forming a part of the city's fortifications. It was the home of the Dukes of Brabant, who also resided in the nearby city of Leuven and in Tervuren Castle. In the following centuries, it was rebuilt, extended, and improved, in line with the increased prestige of the Dukes of Brabant and their successors: the Dukes of Burgundy, Charles V, Holy Roman Emperor, Albert VII, Archduke of Austria and Infanta Isabella Clara Eugenia of Spain, as well as successive Governors of the Habsburg Netherlands.

The Aula Magna, a gigantic room for royal receptions and other pageantry, was built for Philip the Good in the 15th century. The first regular meetings of the States General, composed of delegates from the middle class, clergy and nobility of the Burgundian Netherlands, were held there in 1465. It was in this room that, in 1515, Duchess Margaret of Austria formally relinquished her regency over the Habsburg Netherlands to Charles of Habsburg. It was also in this same room that, in 1555, Charles V abdicated in favour of his son, King Philip II of Spain.

This impressive complex suffered several fires over the centuries. In 1679, a fire destroyed part of the roof. A large fire that broke out on 3 February 1731 almost completely destroyed the building. Only the court chapel and the walls of the Aula Magna were somewhat spared. The ruins only disappeared when the district was redeveloped after 1775. At that time the urban axes of the present-day Brussels Park were laid out. The Place Royale/Koningsplein was built on top of the ruined palace. Excavations of the site by different archaeological organisations have unearthed various remains of different parts of the palace as well as the surrounding town. The monumental vaults remaining under the square and its surrounding buildings can be visited.

=== The new Royal Palace ===
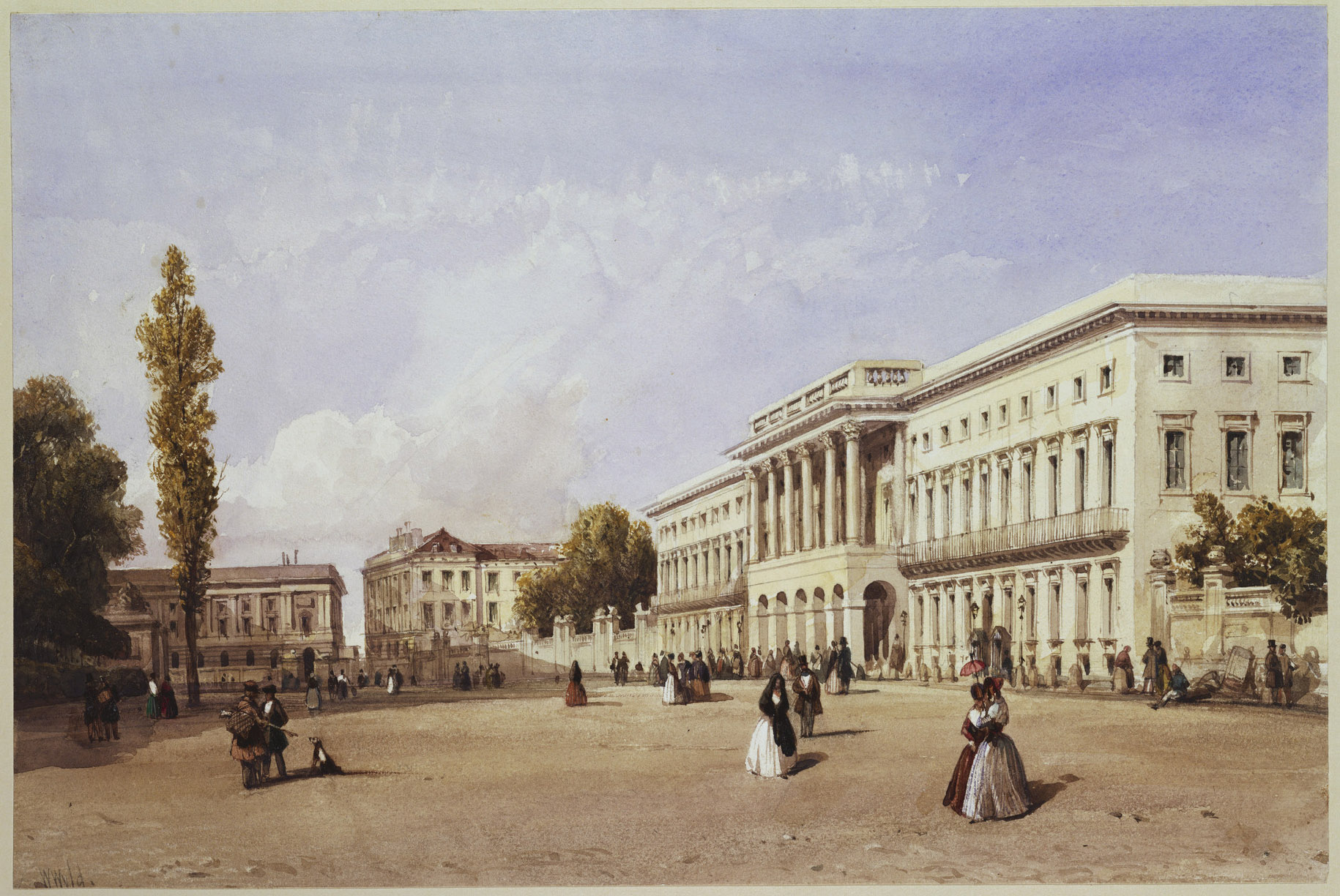
The Royal Palace and the Place des Palais/Paleizenplein, watercolour painting by William Wyld, c. 1843

Prince Charles Alexander of Lorraine, at that time Governor of the Austrian Netherlands, had a new palace, the Palace of Charles of Lorraine, built on the nearby site of the former Palace of Orange-Nassau. The Palace of Charles of Lorraine is now part of the Royal Library of Belgium (KBR) and the old palace's garden was redesigned as a public park. On the northern side, a new building for the Council of Brabant was built by the French architect Gilles-Barnabé Guimard, which now houses the Belgian Federal Parliament and is known as the Palace of the Nation. On the other side of the park (the building plot of the present-day Royal Palace), the park's middle axis continued as a street between two newly built mansions. One served as the abbot's residence of the nearby Coudenberg Abbey, while the other was inhabited by important government members.

After the Congress of Vienna in 1814–15, Brussels became (together with The Hague) the joint capital of the new established United Kingdom of the Netherlands. It was under the rule of King William I of the Netherlands that the street was covered and the two mansions were joined with a gallery. The newly created "Royal Palace" received a new neoclassical façade designed by the architect Tilman-François Suys with a peristyle in the middle, and a balcony with a wrought iron parapet surrounding the entire first floor.

The street running alongside the new Royal Palace was widened and thus the Place des Palais/Paleizenplein ("Palaces' Square") was created. The new square's name uses the plural form because another palace was built on the left side of the Royal Palace. This new building (1823) was designed as the residence of the Crown Prince called the Prince of Orange (the future King William II of the Netherlands). Nowadays, it houses five Belgian academies, including the Royal Academies for Science and the Arts of Belgium (RASAB) and is consequently called the Academy Palace. The rooms and salons of the old mansions were incorporated in the new Royal Palace and were only partly refurnished. Some of them survived the 19th and 20th centuries' renovations and are still partly intact. A major addition to the interior decoration from the time of William I is the so-called Empire Room, which was designed as a ballroom. It has a very refined cream and gold decoration designed and executed by the French sculptor François Rude.

=== Extensions by Leopold II ===
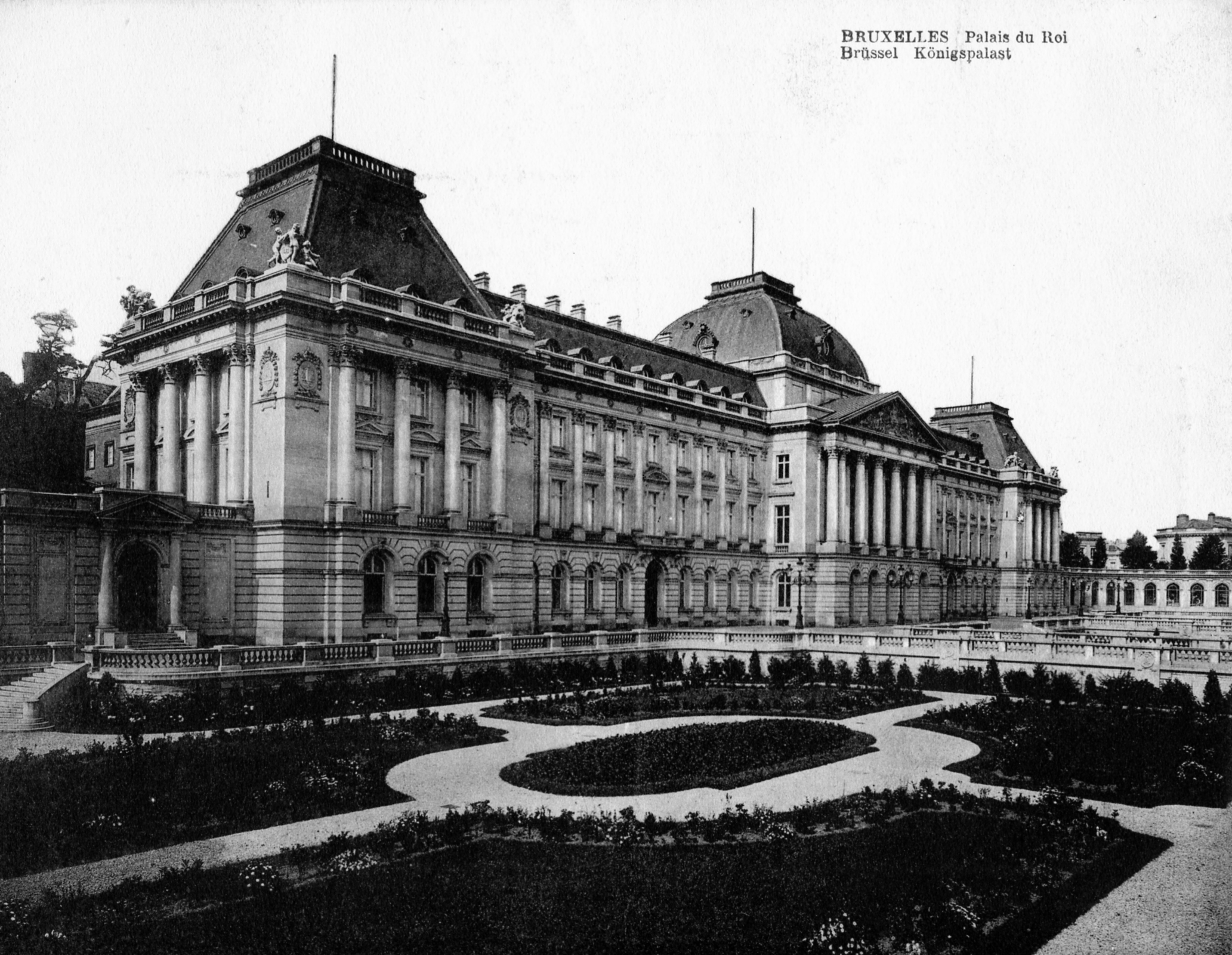
The Royal Palace's reconstructed façade (Maquet, 1904)

After the Belgian Revolution in 1830–31, the Royal Palace was offered to Prince Leopold of Saxe-Coburg-Gotha when he ascended the throne as King Leopold I, the first King of the Belgians. Just like his predecessor, William II, he used the palace mainly for official receptions and other representational purposes and lived in the Royal Palace of Laeken. During his reign (until 1865), little was changed to the palace. It was his son and successor, King Leopold II, who judging the building to be too modest for a king of his stature, kept on enlarging and embellishing the palace until his death in 1909.

During Leopold II's reign, the palace nearly doubled in surface area. The houses located between the different buildings were destroyed and gave way to two symmetrical curved galleries, which considerably widened the length of the building. A large part of the shallow grounds located in front of the palace were also filled in, in order to increase the space in front of its façade. After the designs of the king's architect Alphonse Balat, imposing rooms like the Grand Staircase, the Throne Room and the Grand Gallery were added. Balat also planned a new façade but died before the plans could be executed.

The palace's current façade was only executed after 1904 according to new plans by the architect Henri Maquet. Suys' façade was demolished for this undertaking and the new façade was added to the gutted salons. The salons and the Empire Room in the east wing were restored, as were the Hall of Mirrors and new salons in the west wing. The sculpture of the façade's pediment shows an allegorical figure of Belgium flanked by groups representing Industry and Agriculture, by the sculptor Thomas Vinçotte. The new design includes a formal front garden with gilded railings, gates and balustrades, separating the building from the Place des Palais.

=== Contemporary ===
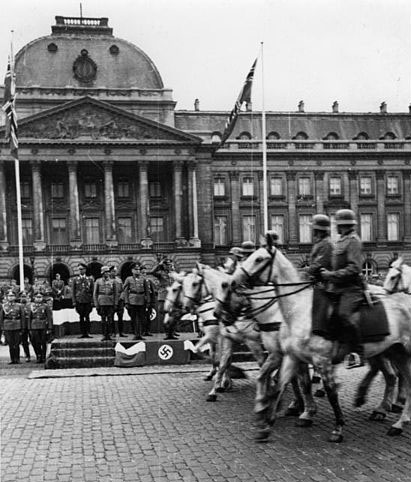
German soldiers parade past the palace, May 1940

The work left unfinished at the death of Leopold II in 1909 and Maquet in 1911 was taken up under King Albert I by Maquet's pupil, Octave Flanneau, who rebuilt the Hôtel de la Liste Civile. Interrupted by the First World War, it resumed in 1920. In 1930, the interior of the east wing was rebuilt. In 1934–1936, the study plan for the ground floor was drawn up by Henri van de Velde. The west wing was inhabited by Prince Charles, Count of Flanders, who converted the greenhouse into the Flemish Hall in 1938.

Since then, apart from maintenance and restoration work, there has not been any more major transformations. The royal apartments were still occupied until 1935, but after Queen Astrid's death, King Leopold III chose to live in the Palace of Laeken, like all the kings who have succeeded him. The palace's interior was completely renovated in 1955–1958. In 1987, the Ministry of Public Works undertook the restoration, among others, of the Empire Room, the Throne Room and the Small and Large White Drawing Rooms. Since 1965, the palace has been open to the public regularly from 21 July (Belgian National Day) until the beginning of September.

Around 2010, some of the palace's halls were converted into meeting rooms, with adapted sound systems and facilities for simultaneous interpretation. In March 2023, new renovation work began on the palace's façade, including the installation of double glazing. The balustrades, stone stairs, garden walls, gates and fences are also being repaired. The project cost approximately €6 million.

== Exterior ==
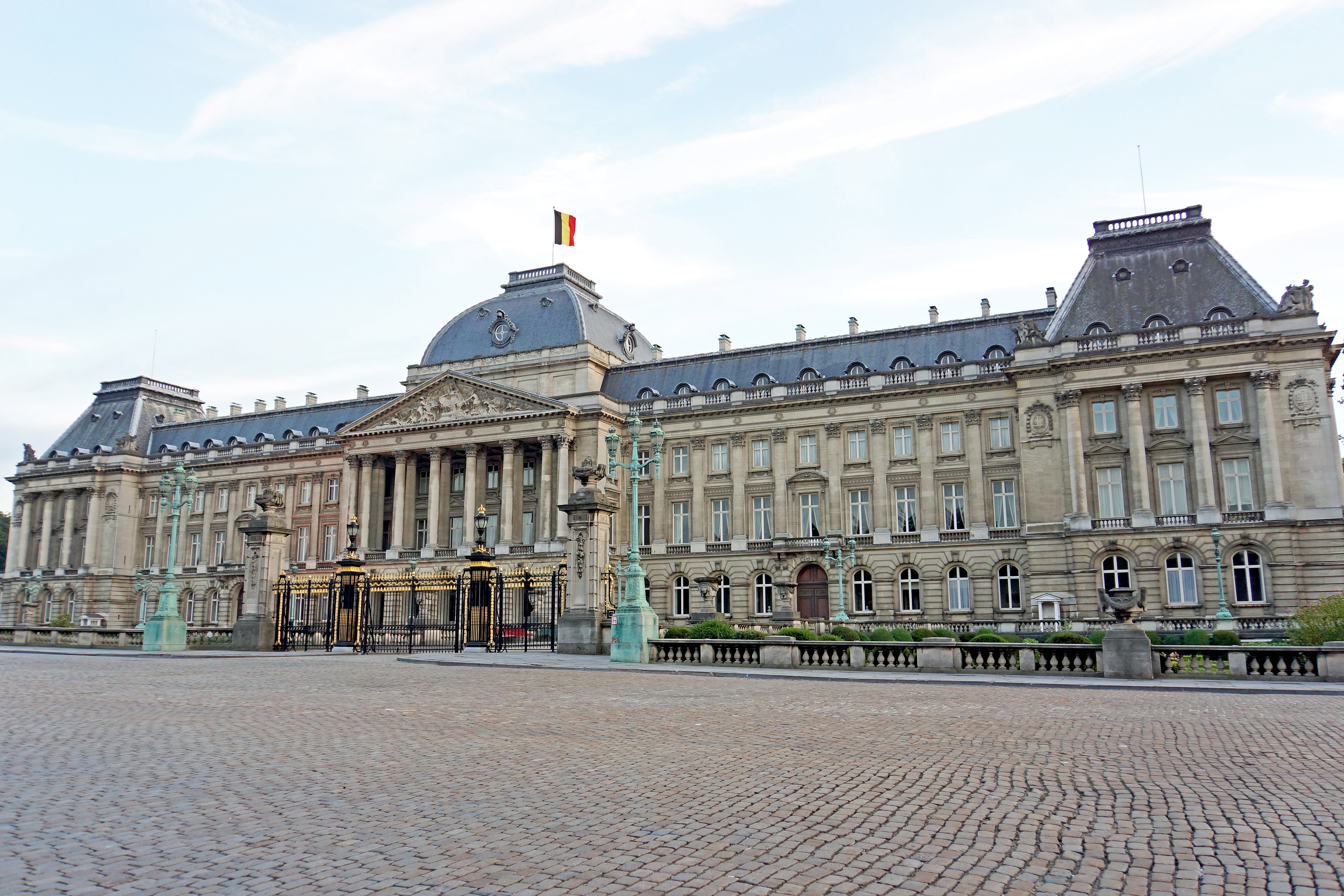
Main façade of the Royal Palace

The Royal Palace, imposing and majestic, is characterised by many revival styles, of which Leopold II was a supporter. The building is made up of three parts: a central wing, marked by projections to the north and south; an east wing; and a west wing, each surrounding a large rectangular courtyard accessible by road from the north and south. The complex is surrounded by formal gardens, French style at the front, English style at the rear, and entirely enclosed by balustraded walls.

The main façade, facing the Place des Palais, is completely symmetrical and is crowned in the middle with a large pediment. It largely dates from the 19th-century reconstruction; only the colonnade and balcony of the old palace have been preserved. The street was shifted to make room for the front garden, consisting of three sunken parterres. Extending the palace symmetrically towards the east and west along the street side are curved galleries ending in two corner pavilions, connected to the Hôtel de la Liste Civile to the east, and to the Hôtel Belle-Vue to the west.

== Interior ==
The Royal Palace is especially striking for the magnificence of its interiors and some important works of art are exhibited there. The rooms reflect different periods and styles, combining historical furnishings and contemporary artistic contributions.

=== Grand Staircase ===
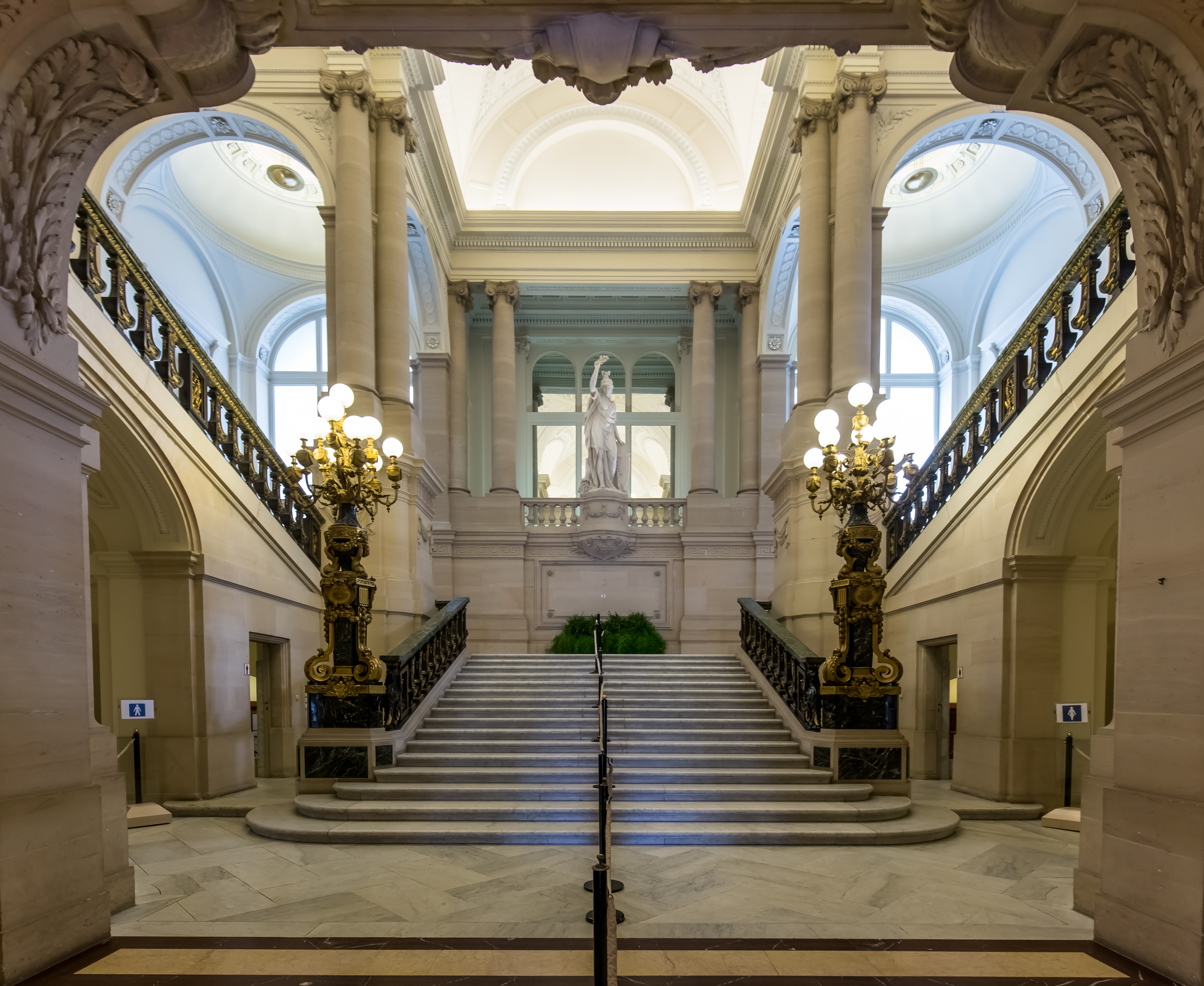
Grand Staircase

Located on the site of the former Rue Héraldique, the Grand Staircase was designed by Alphonse Balat in 1868 and 1872. In front of the central flight, in a false loggia, dominates a statue of Peace in the guise of Minerva made by the sculptor Charles-Auguste Fraikin in 1877. The steps are made of white marble and the banisters of green marble enhanced with bronze decoration.

Access to this staircase is via a vestibule housing the busts of some Kings and Queens of the Belgians. Two full-length portraits of the current sovereigns frame the door. One also finds in these spaces two bronze candelabra taking up the motifs of the Dying Slave and the Rebellious Slave by Michelangelo, as well as two Egyptian statues of the goddess Sekhmet probably brought back by the young Prince Leopold during his trips to the Orient.

=== Large Anteroom ===
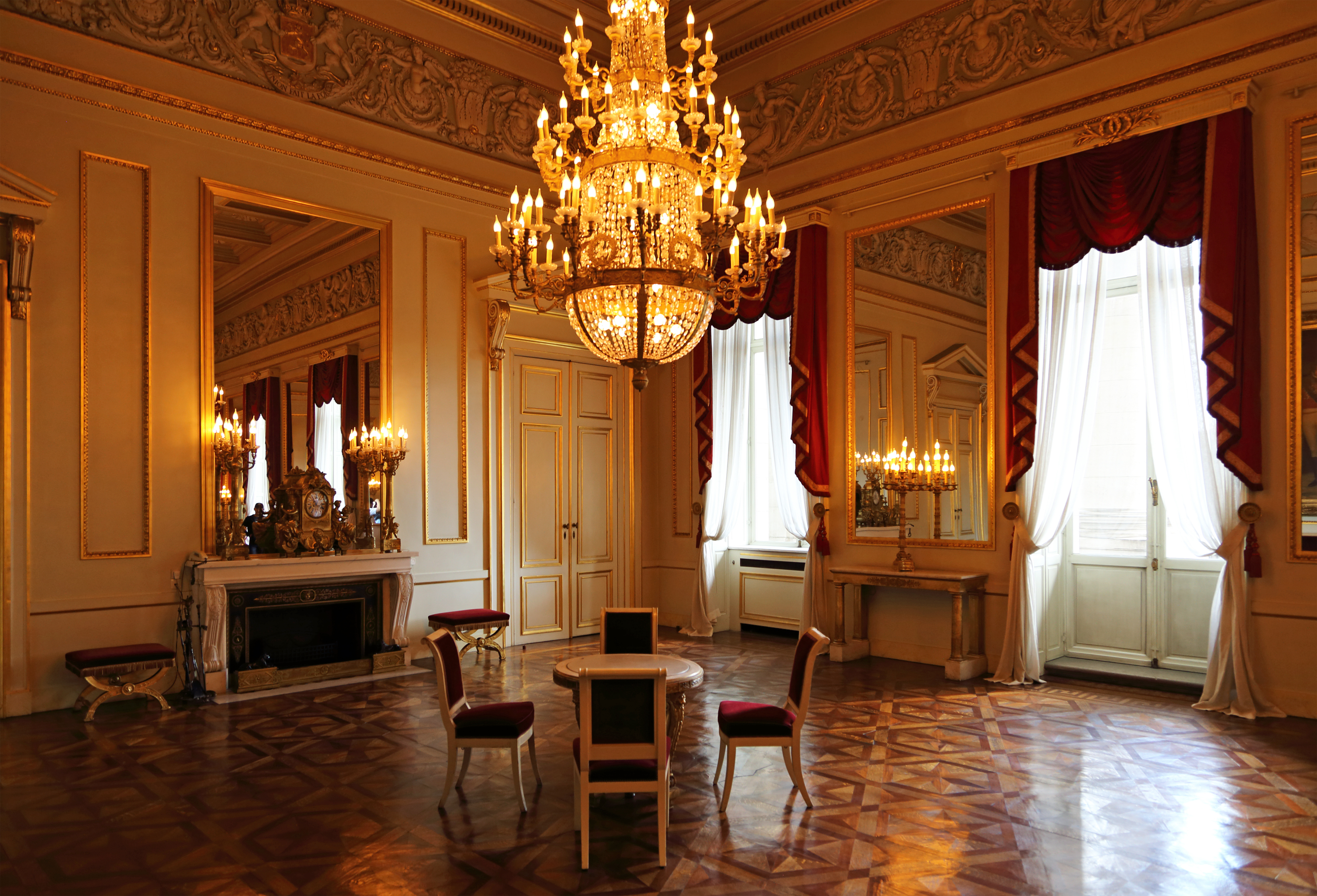
Large Anteroom

The Large Anteroom was used under William I of the Netherlands as the Throne Room. Its decoration is therefore loaded with many political symbols relating to the United Kingdom of the Netherlands. Produced by the sculptors François Rude and Jean-Louis van Geel around 1826, the frieze running all around the room thus represents the four main economic activities of the country (Trade, Navigation, Industry and Agriculture) and the four virtues of good governance (Abundance, Prudence, Armed force and Peace). The frieze was reworked under Leopold II to include his cipher and the coat of arms of Belgium.

Above the door leading to the Grand Staircase, a bas-relief depicts two female figures holding hands above a crowned lion and holding a sword and a bundle of arrows. It is a representation of the union of the Northern Provinces (holding a rudder) and the Southern Provinces (holding a cornucopia) under the aegis of the House of Orange-Nassau (represented by the lion). It is therefore the last true Dutch symbol present in the palace, as the lion is still the one depicted on the coat of arms of the Netherlands. This room also contains two paintings by the English portraitist George Dawe, representing the young Prince Leopold of Saxe-Coburg-Gotha and Princess Charlotte of Wales at the time of their wedding.

=== 'Il Pensieroso' Room or Square Room ===
The 'Il Pensieroso' Room or Square Room takes its former name from the mantelpiece clock with a bronze reproduction of Michelangelo's Il Pensieroso ("The Thinker"), which adorns the fireplace. This space is also used as a chapel in the event of the death of a member of the Belgian royal family.

=== Hall of Mirrors ===
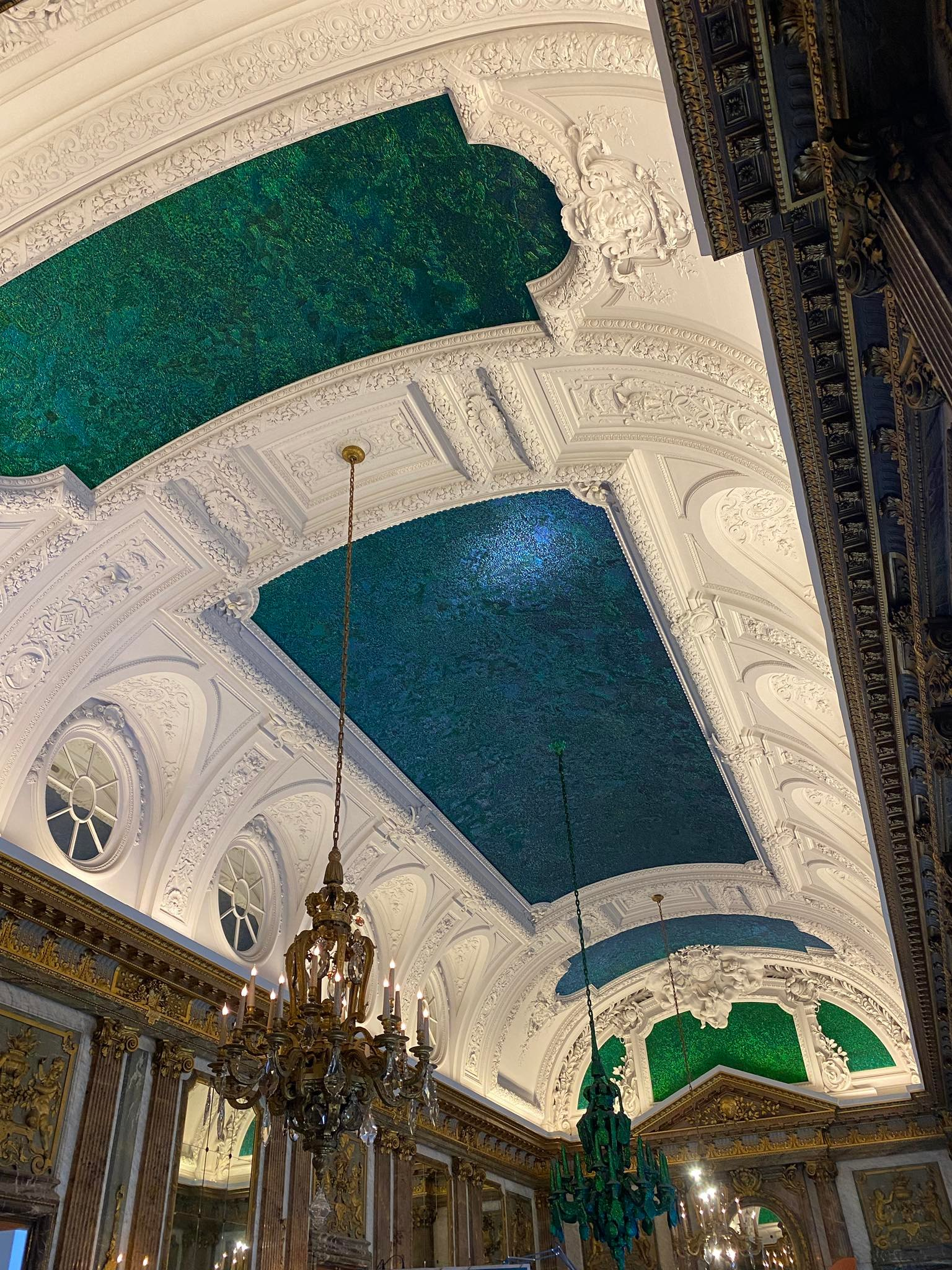
Heaven of Delight (Fabre, 2004) in the Hall of Mirrors

Requested by Leopold II from Henri Maquet as a tribute to his Congo colony, the Hall of Mirrors contains many elements reminiscent of its primary vocation: exotic plant decorations, lion figures, copper sconces (and not gilding, the Congo being very rich in copper mines) and especially terrestrial globes depicting Africa in the pediments above the chimneys. The architect and the king having died a few months apart, Albert I decided not to pursue his uncle's plans and to have mirrors installed between the columns instead of the allegorical paintings initially planned.

At that time, the barrel ceiling remained unfinished and only covered with a layer of stucco. It was not until 2004 that, at the request of Queen Paola, the artist Jan Fabre installed there a work called Heaven of Delight made up of more than a million beetle elytra in order to reflect the light with a metallic green tint. Despite the artist's conviction for sexual offences, the palace decided to keep his creation. The room is mainly used today for the reception of letters of credence from ambassadors posted in Brussels.

=== Grand Gallery ===
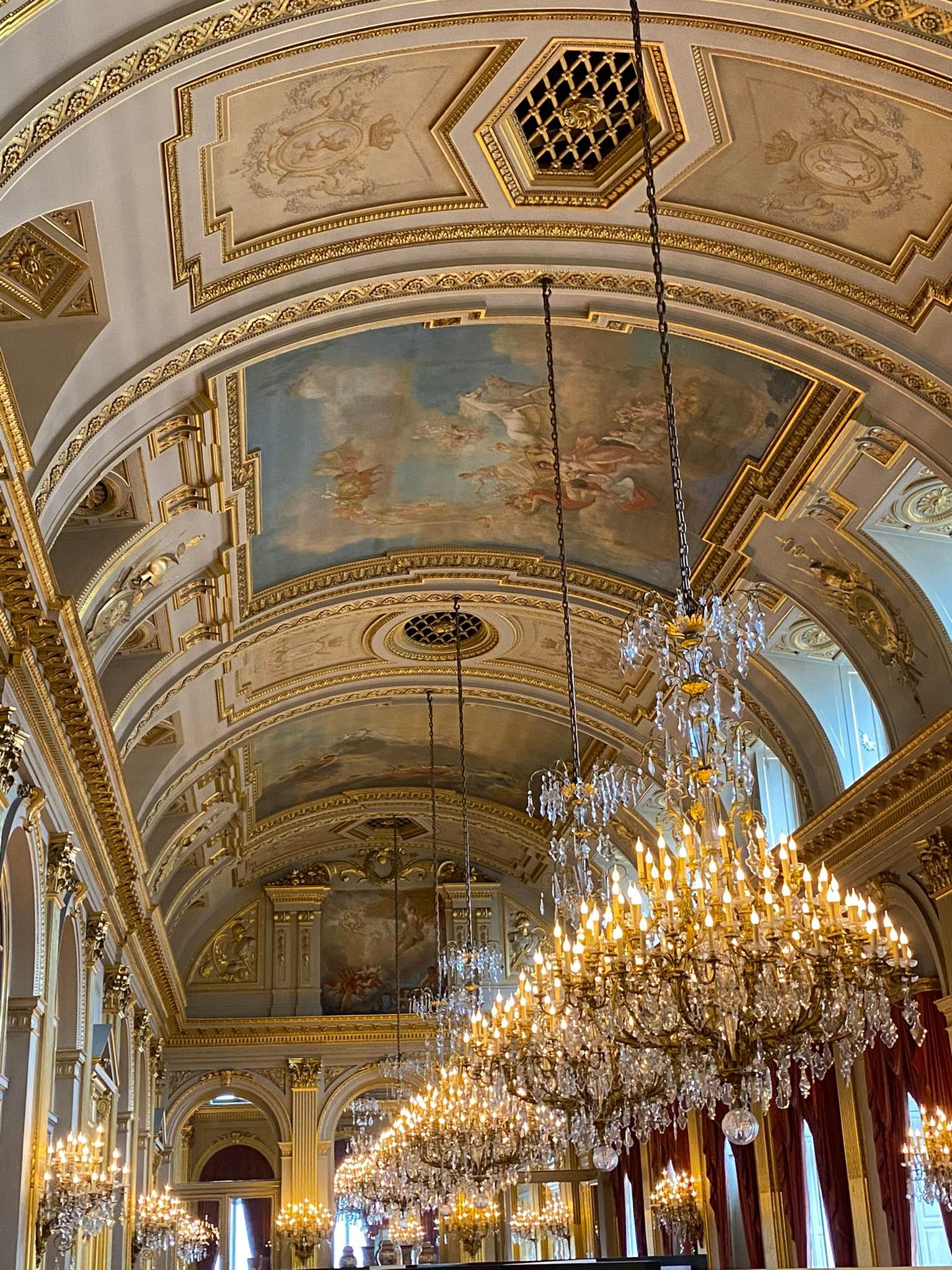
Grand Gallery

The Grand Gallery, 41 m (135 ft) long, connects the Square Room to the Throne Room while skirting the Brabant Courtyard. It was originally intended to include a gallery of portraits of the historic rulers of Belgium, but this idea was never realised. Its current decoration, in a fairly sober neo-Louis XVI style with white stucco and Corinthian pilasters raised in gold, is embellished with allegorical paintings by Charles-Léon Cardon, reproducing or even copying at the request of Leopold II works by the French painters Charles Le Brun and Louis-Jacques Durameau: Dawn, Day and Twilight are completed by Aurora located on one of the central walls.

This gallery, ideal for its length and the possibility of housing an orchestra on a raised balcony, often hosts receptions: for example the dinner given in honour of Prince Philip, Duke of Edinburgh in 1958, the ball given the day before the wedding of King Baudouin with Fabiola de Mora y Aragón in 1960 or the reception that followed the wedding of Prince Philippe with Mathilde d'Udekem d'Acoz in 1999.

=== Marble Room ===
Built by Balat in the west wing of the palace, the Marble Room owes its name to its panelling and its green, pink and black marble fireplaces. On the walls, two portraits by Louis Gallait represent Godfrey of Bouillon and Charles V. The space served mainly as a dining room, as at the time of the wedding of Princess Louise with Prince Philipp of Saxe-Coburg and Gotha, and had for this purpose a pantry and a freight elevator embedded behind doors.

=== Throne Room ===
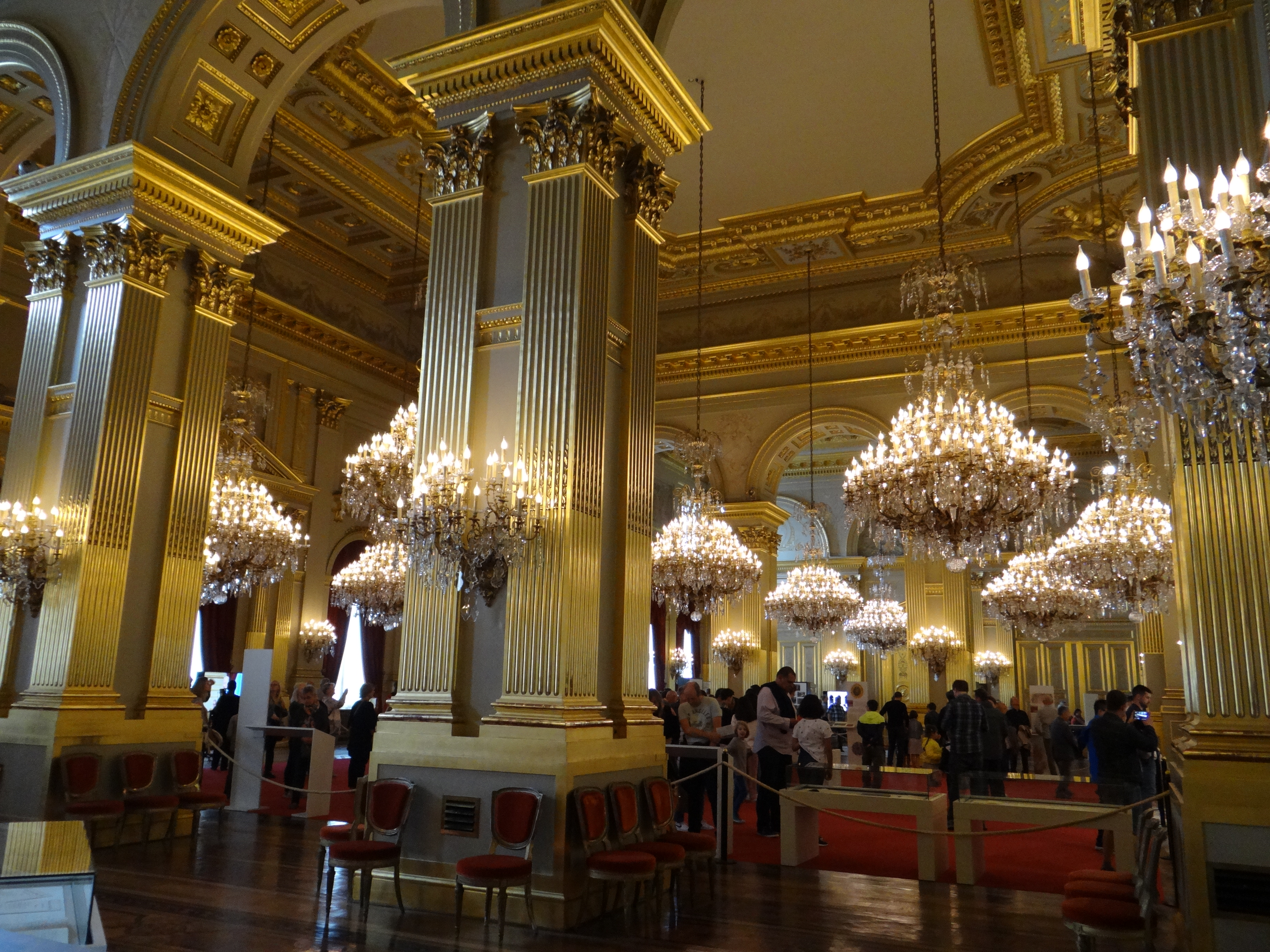
Throne Room

Despite its name, the Throne Room does not house any throne because the King of the Belgians simply does not have one (just like a crown). This room is divided into three spaces separated by arched arcades supported by Corinthian pillars. The neo-Louis XVI style decor corresponds to the will of Leopold II, whose monogram is inscribed in the parquet flooring in oak, maple, mahogany and ebony. It was Queen Elisabeth who had the red velvet and silk hangings installed.

The exterior spaces are each decorated with a large allegorical bas-relief of the Meuse and Scheldt rivers, works of the sculptor Thomas Vinçotte. The perimeter of the central space is decorated with female figures attributed to Auguste Rodin, representing the Belgian Provinces and their main activities. Only the Province of Brabant (unitary at the time the frieze was created) is not represented because the palace was already built on Brabant territory.

This room has seen many historical events take place, such as the abdication of Leopold III in 1951, that of Albert II in 2013 or the civil marriage of King Baudouin and Queen Fabiola in 1960. It is also there that the reception of the constituted bodies takes place during the Christmas and New Year celebrations, the presentation of the King Baudouin International Development Prize and that of the triennial prize for Flemish literature.

=== Pillar Room or Blue Room ===
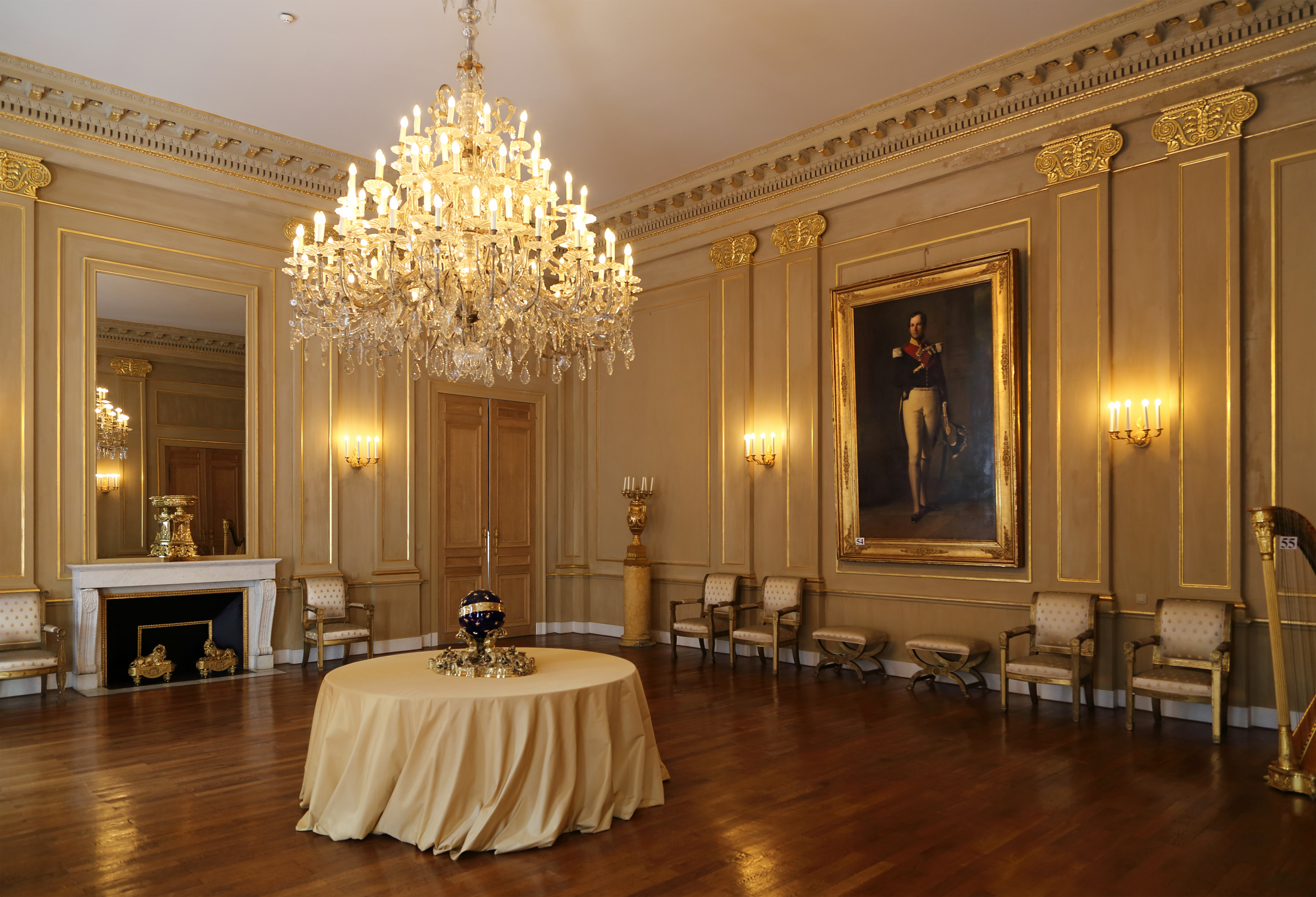
Pillar Room

Originally an anteroom, what is now the Pillar Room later became a reception area for the kingdom's great noble families. Known then as the Blue Room (the colour referring to the expression blue blood), the room was full of paintings and included a table set with the birds of Buffon service ordered to the painter Frédéric Théodore Faber. Even if this noble privilege disappeared during the reign of Baudouin, the expression Princes and Dukes of the Blue Room survived in the documents regulating precedence.

On the occasion of the Asia–Europe Meeting (ASEM) in 2010, Queen Paola asked the decorator Axel Vervoordt to renovate the room. It was completely modified, going so far as to repaint the walls in the ochre colour they had in the Dutch era (hence the change of name for this room). It now houses a portrait of Leopold I painted in 1846 by Franz Xaver Winterhalter, Empire style armchairs that belonged to Napoleon and his wife Joséphine at the Palace of Laeken, as well as a harp and a music stand probably belonging to Queen Louise.

=== Louis XVI Room ===
The Louis XVI Room, like the Blue Room or the Pillar Room and the Marshals' Room, dates back to the time of William I. It was used at the time as an anteroom and was later converted into a living room. Alongside the portraits of family members of Leopold I are some canvases from his personal collection. The depiction of his deceased first wife, Allegory of the Death of Princess Charlotte, is a work by portrait painter and historian Arthur William Devis. Works by Michaël Borremans were also added to the room during its refurbishment in 2010.

=== Empire Room ===
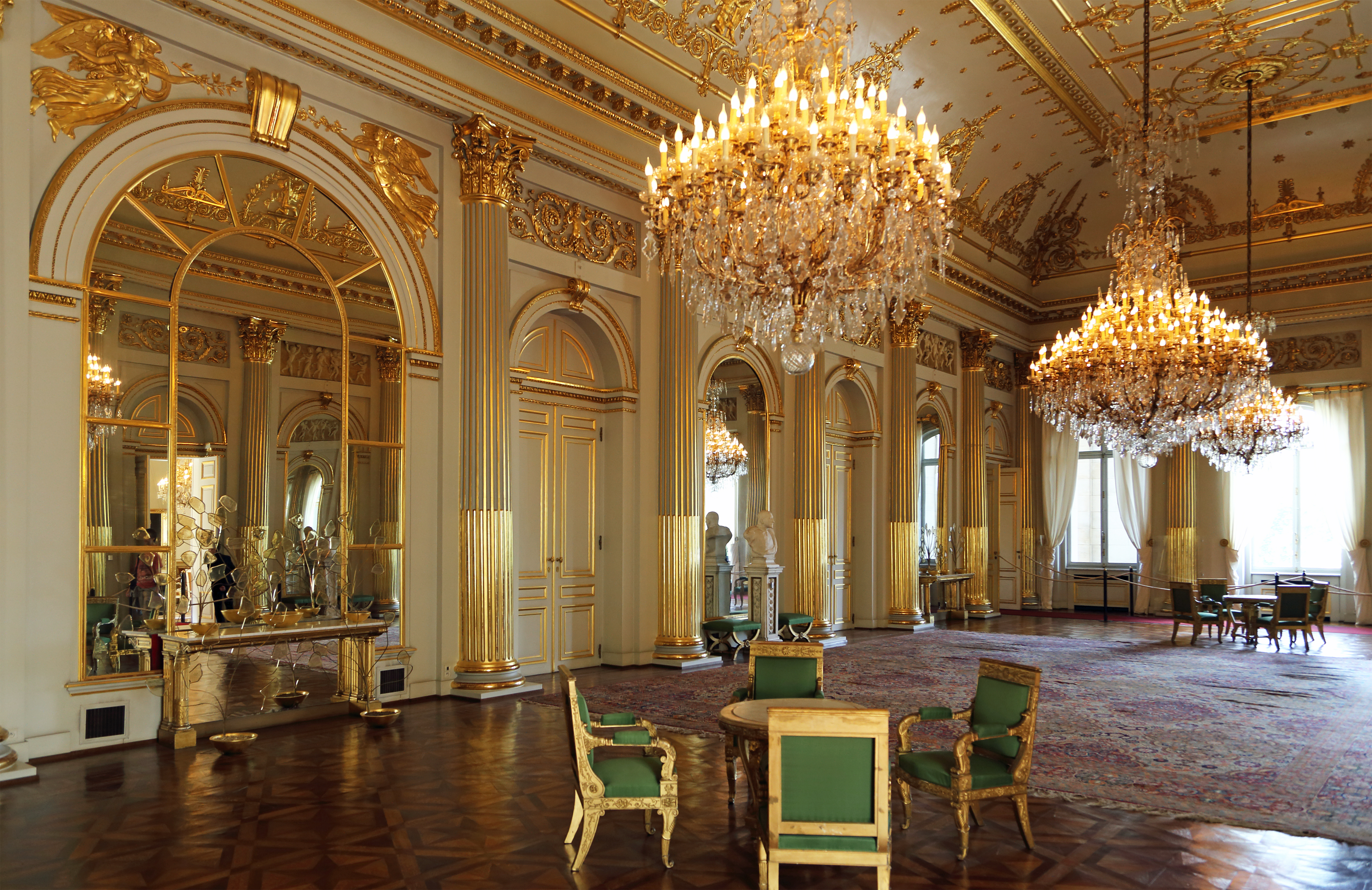
Empire Room

Vestige of the former Hotel Belgiojoso renovated under William I to make it a ballroom, the Empire Room's decoration still bears traces of the Austrian era, such as the dancing putti above the doors. It was in this room that Napoleon received with his wife Joséphine the authorities of the City of Brussels in 1803.

On the floor, the room sometimes houses a huge Kerman carpet offered by Shah Mozaffar ad-Din Shah Qajar of Persia to Leopold II in 1900, and which recalls this gift in a Persian inscription. On the two central chimneys, there are also busts of Leopold I and his son, Prince Philippe, Count of Flanders.

This room housed, among other things, the marriage of Prince Albert of Liège to Paola Ruffo di Calabria in 1959 and the signing of the sixth state reform in 2014. It also contains a work by Patrick Corillon entitled Flowers of the Royal Palace.

=== Coburg Room ===
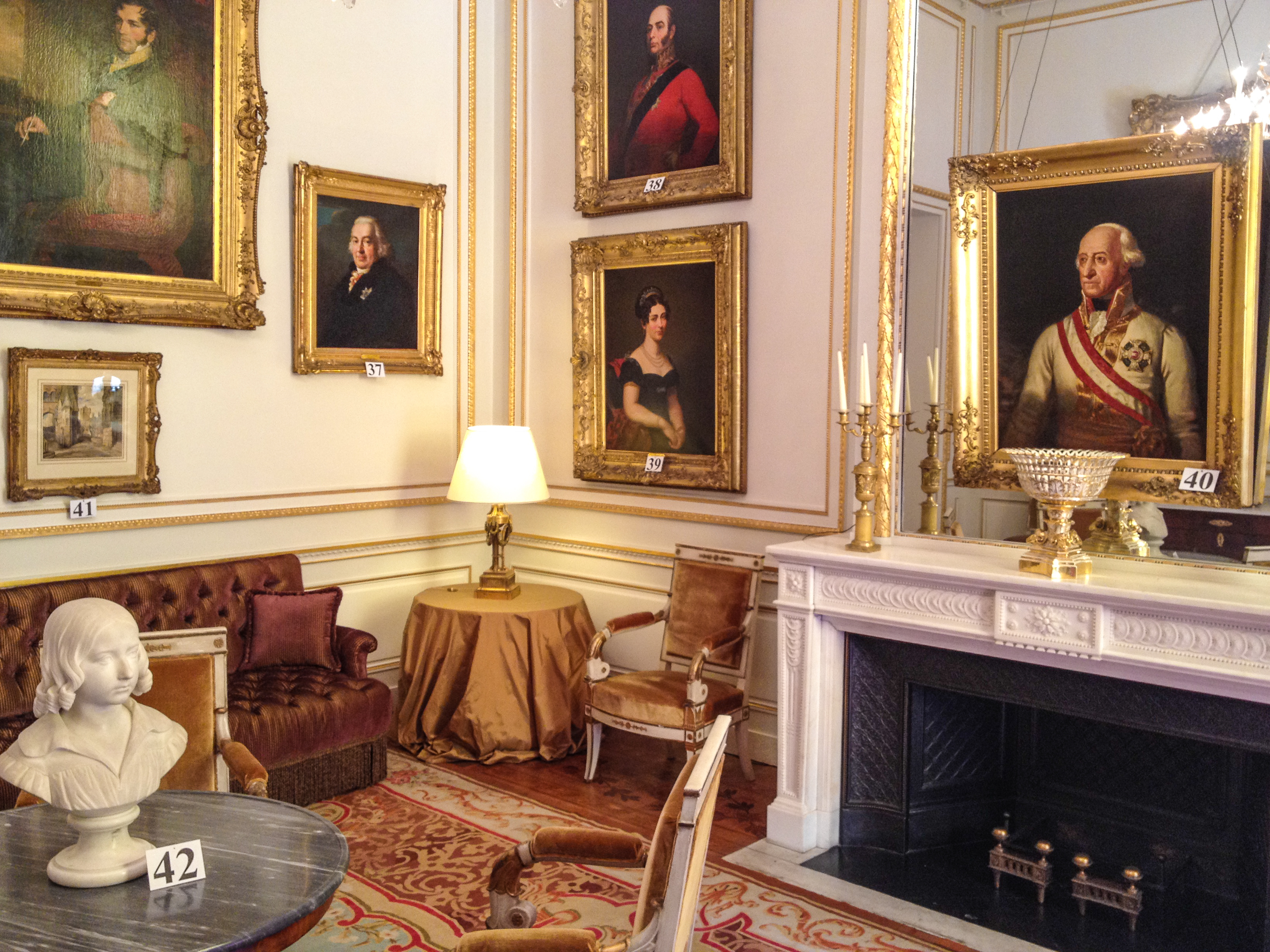
Coburg Room

The Coburg Room takes its name from the set of portraits by different artists, representing a large number of relatives of Leopold I. Among them are the king himself, when he was still only prince of Saxe-Coburg-Saalfeld; (Note: The name of Saxe-Coburg-Gotha would only come after the acquisition of the eponymous duchy by his brother Ernest I, Duke of Saxe-Coburg and Gotha.) his father Francis, Duke of Saxe-Coburg-Saalfeld; his mother Countess Augusta Reuss of Ebersdorf; his sister Princess Victoria of Saxe-Coburg-Saalfeld and brother-in-law Prince Edward, Duke of Kent and Strathearn (parents of Queen Victoria); his great-uncle Prince Josias of Saxe-Coburg-Saalfeld (generalfeldmarschall of the Austrian army); his wife Queen Louise; as well as a bust of the future Leopold II by the sculptor Guillaume Geefs.

=== Goya Room ===
Initially a billiard room, the Goya Room has since 1905 housed three tapestries woven at the Royal Tapestry Factory of Santa Bárbara from designs by Francisco de Goya: The Dance, The Little Blind Man and The Water Carrier. These tapestries were offered by Queen Isabella II of Spain to Leopold I.

=== Small and Large White Drawing Rooms ===
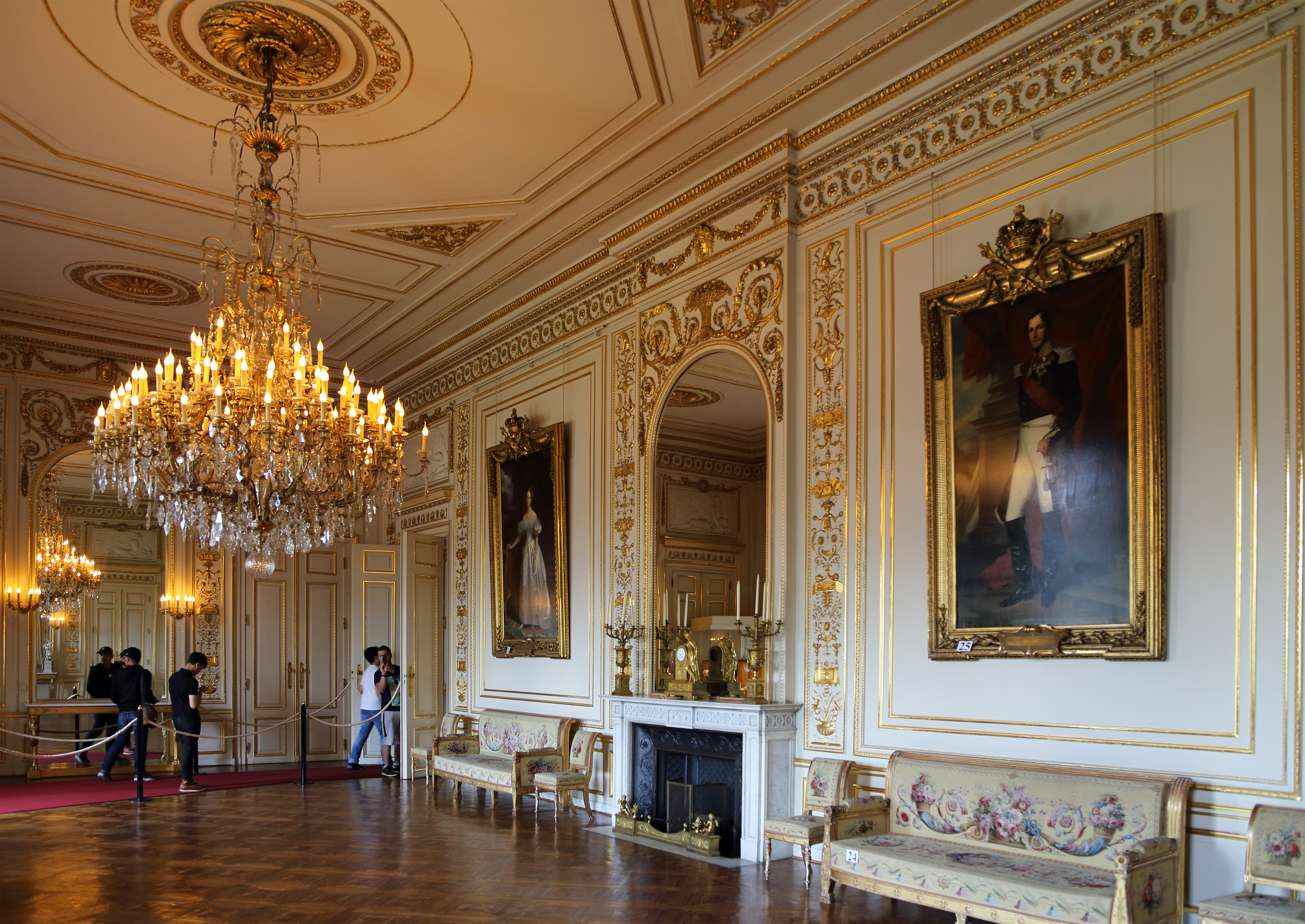
Grand White Drawing Room

Like the Empire Room, the Small and Large White Drawing Rooms are among the oldest parts of the palace. The original 18th-century decorations have been preserved. The Empire style furniture, a wedding present given by King Louis Philippe I of the French to his daughter Louise of Orléans and Leopold I, still bears its original Beauvais tapestry decoration.

The Small White Drawing Room is decorated with portraits of Louise and her parents, Louis-Philippe and Princess Maria Amalia of Naples and Sicily.

=== Venice Staircase ===
Built by Balat between 1868 and 1872, the Venice Staircase owes its name to the large oils on canvas representing different views of Venice. Painted by Jean-Baptiste Van Moer in 1867 (while the painter was using his Prix de Rome to visit Italy), they represent Saint Mark's Square, the Grand Canal and the inner courtyard of the Doge's Palace. Other paintings, representing the Piazzetta and the Porta della Carta, were later commissioned by Leopold II from the artist and installed in a small annexe corridor.

== Functions ==
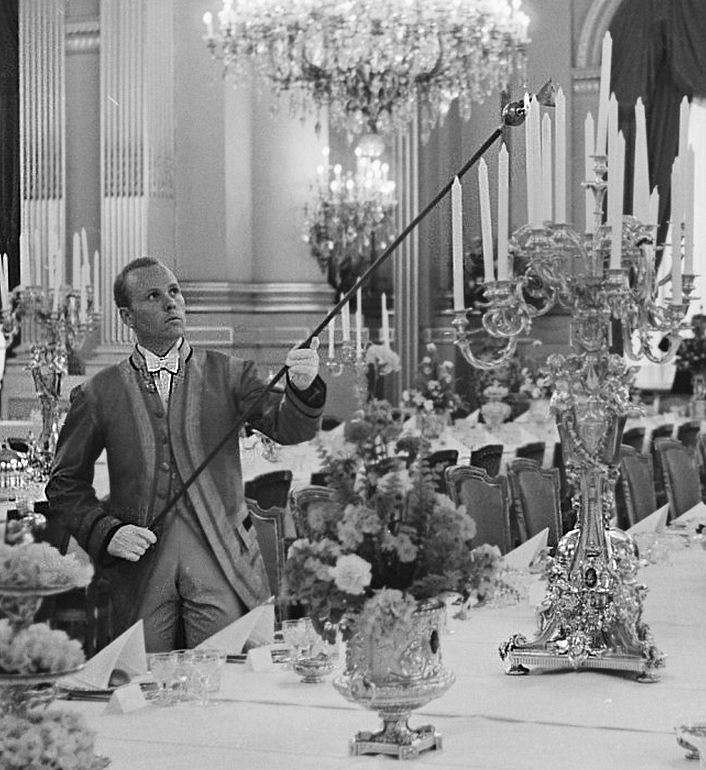
The palace is used for state occasions at court.

Unlike most European royal residences, the Palace of Brussels is no longer the real residence of the Kings of the Belgians, who prefer to live in the Palace of Laeken. It was under Leopold III that the palace really only became a place of work, housing the king's office as well as the services of his household. It was also at the palace that the Councils of Ministers took place, then often chaired by the king. Leopold III being reluctant to play the game of the parliamentary regime of the time, he only rarely convened these meetings, which then took place elsewhere.

Although it is no longer the private residence of the sovereigns, the palace has continued to house members of the royal family and to see important events take place for them. Only one king was born there (Leopold II, on 9 April 1835), none died there, but many marriages took place there: among many others, that of the future Leopold II with Marie-Henriette of Habsburg-Lorraine, that of Princess Charlotte with Archduke Maximilian, that of Prince Albert of Liège with Paola Ruffo di Calabria, that of King Baudouin with Fabiola de Mora y Aragón and that of Prince Philippe with Mathilde d'Udekem d'Acoz.

The palace plays a big role in the receptions of international personalities. Currently, the many ambassadors accredited to Belgium are received by the king in the Hall of Mirrors. The palace can also serve more specific functions: for instance, during the First World War and on the initiative of Queen Elisabeth, it became a military hospital of the Red Cross. As often mentioned, it has a façade 50% longer than that of Buckingham Palace in London, but its floor area of 33,027 m^{2} (355,500 sq ft) is less than half of Buckingham Palace's floor area at 77,000 m^{2} (830,000 sq ft).

== Royal Collection ==
In the Royal Palace, an important part of the Royal Collection is found. This consists of mainly state portraits and important furniture of Napoleon, Leopold I, Louis Philippe I and Leopold II. Silverware, porcelain and fine crystal is kept in the cellars used during state banquets and formal occasions at court. Queen Paola added modern art in some of the state rooms.

During state visits, the royal apartments and suites are at the disposal of visiting heads of state. Ambassadors too are received there with state ceremony. New Year's receptions are held for NATO, EU ambassadors and politicians. Royal wedding banquets take place in the palace, and after their death, the body of the deceased king lies in state there. If the king is currently in the country, the flag is hoisted on the central building. If he is present inside the palace, then the guard of honour stands at the front of the palace.

== Surroundings ==
The adjacent park, Brussels Park, is separated from the Royal Palace by the Place des Palais. This rectangular park, measuring more than 13 ha (32 acres), contains around sixty sculptures, primarily inspired by Greco-Roman mythology; two water basins with fountains; monumental neoclassical railings and gates; as well as two bandstands where numerous shows take place in the summer. The park's middle axis marks both the middle peristyle of the Royal Palace and of the Belgian Federal Parliament building (Palace of the Nation) on the other side of the park. The two facing buildings are said to symbolise Belgium's system of government: a constitutional monarchy.

== Gallery ==
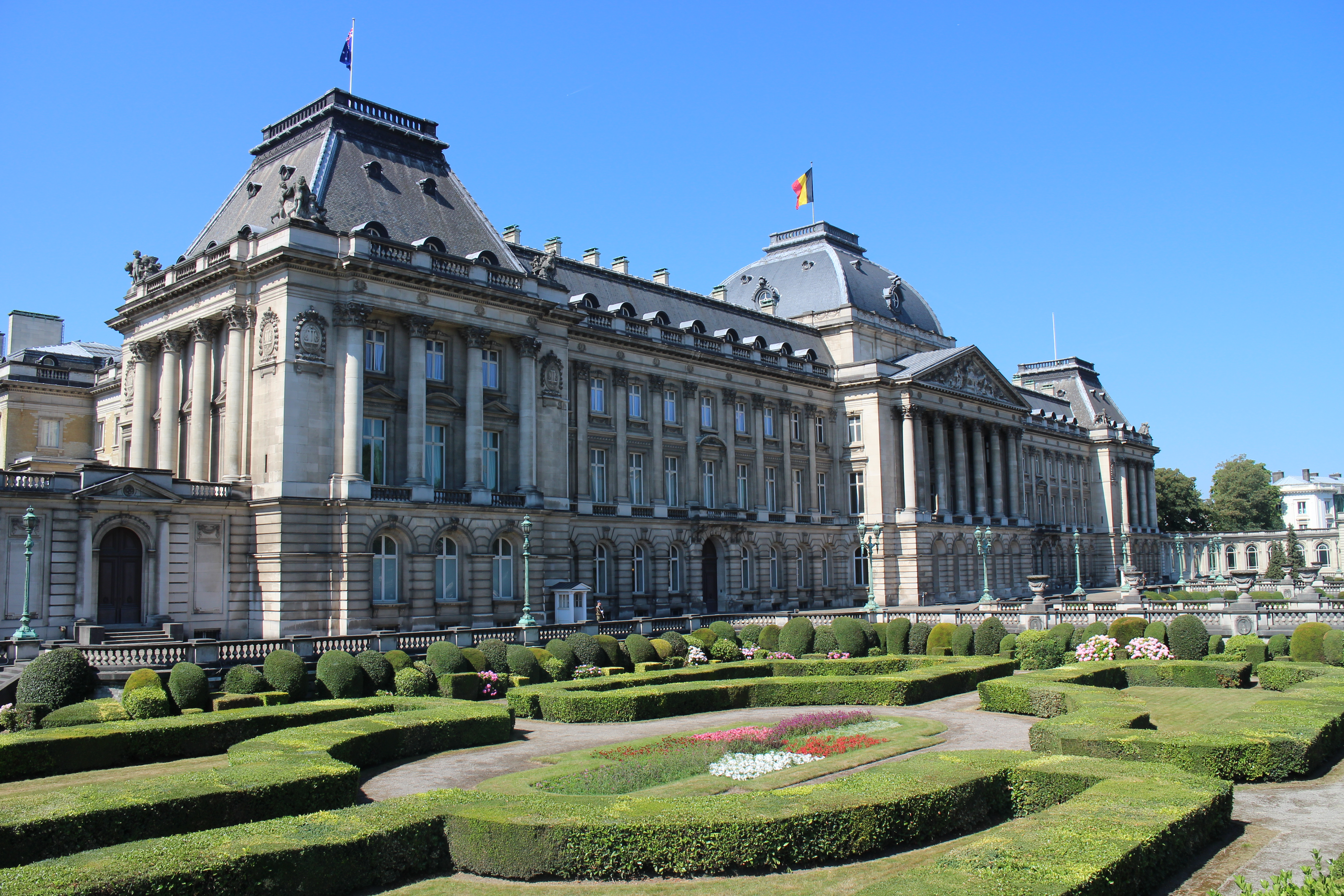
The Royal Palace viewed from the north-eastern corner

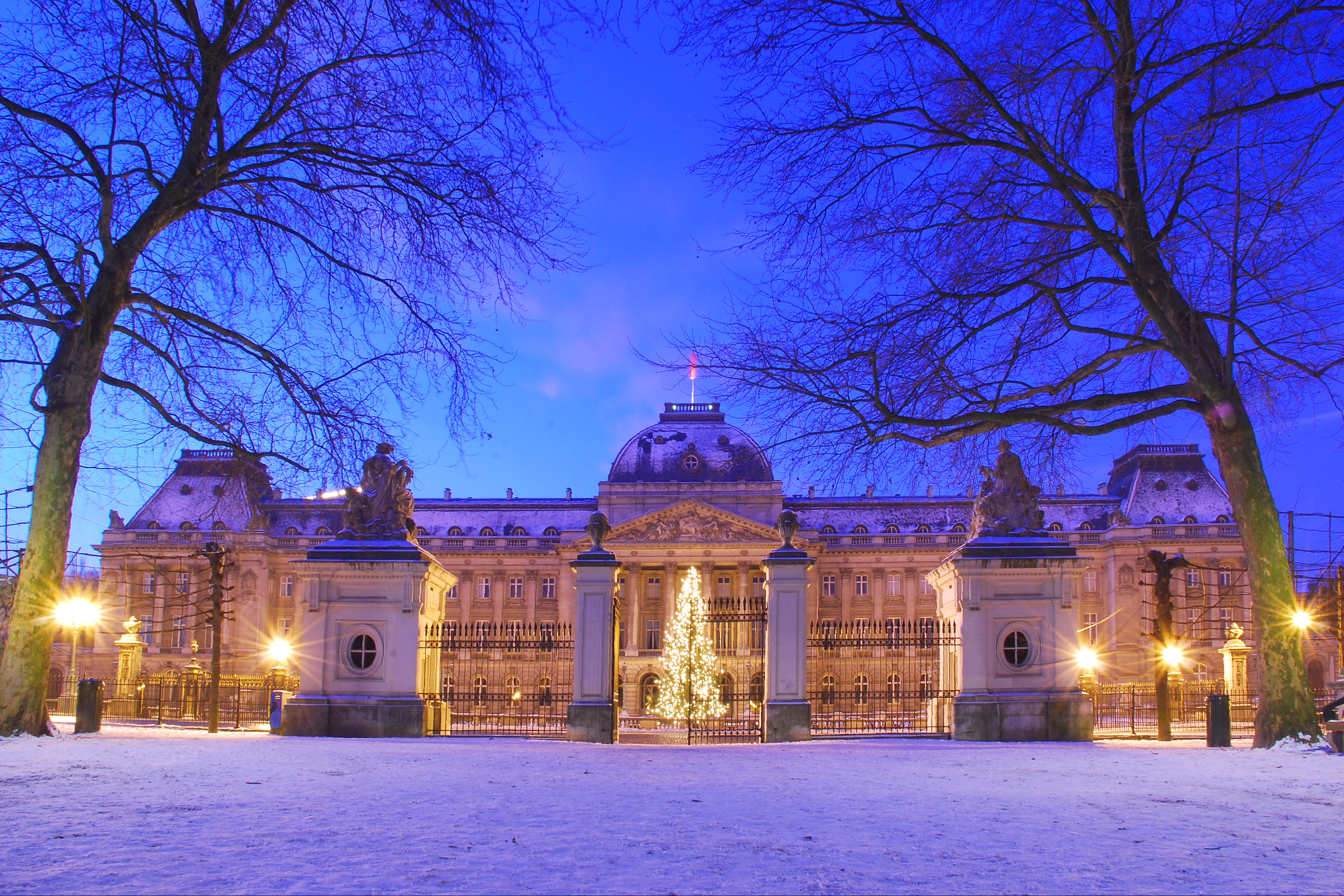
The Royal Palace viewed from Brussels Park during winter

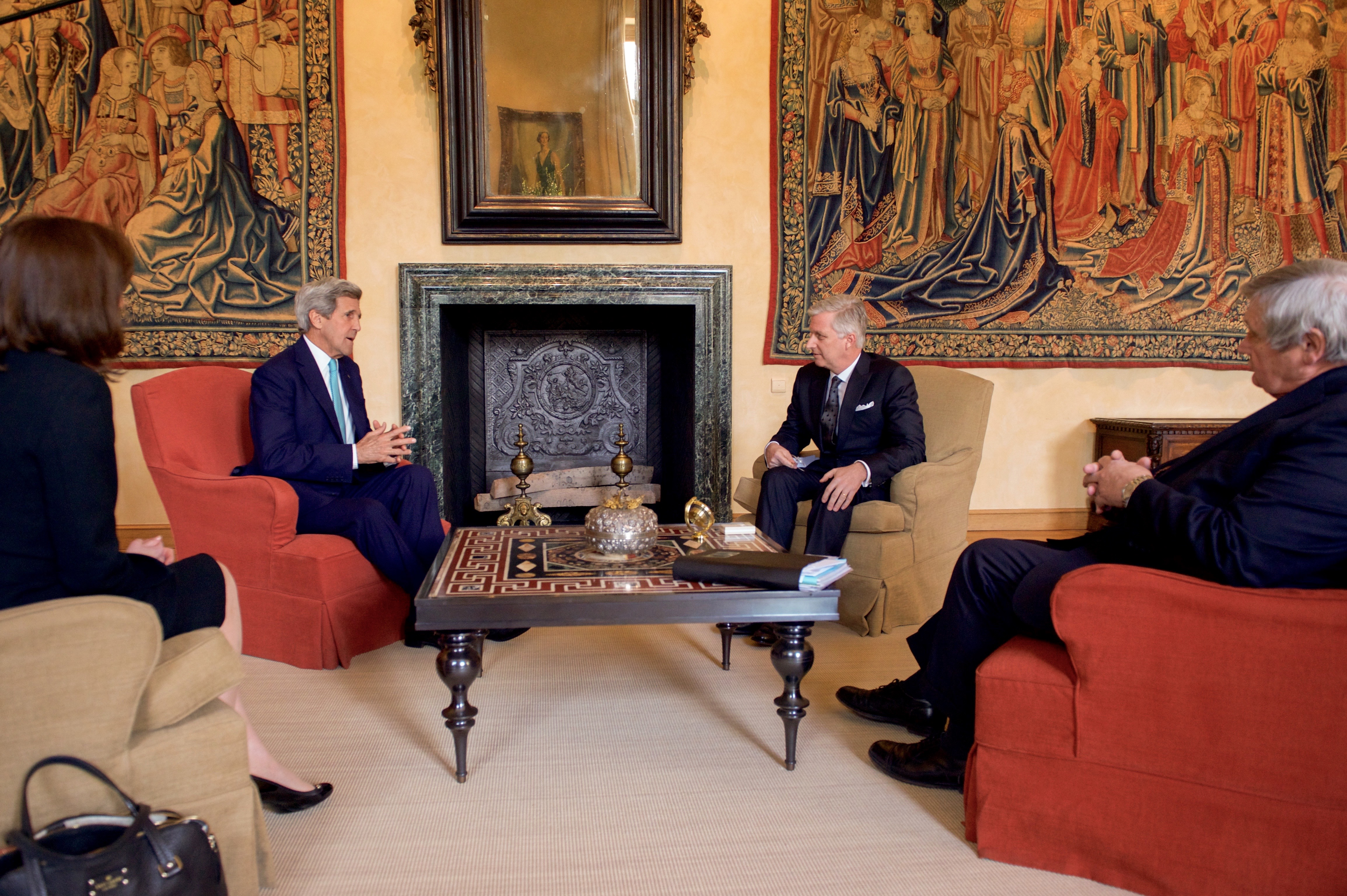
King Philippe during a private audience in his Office

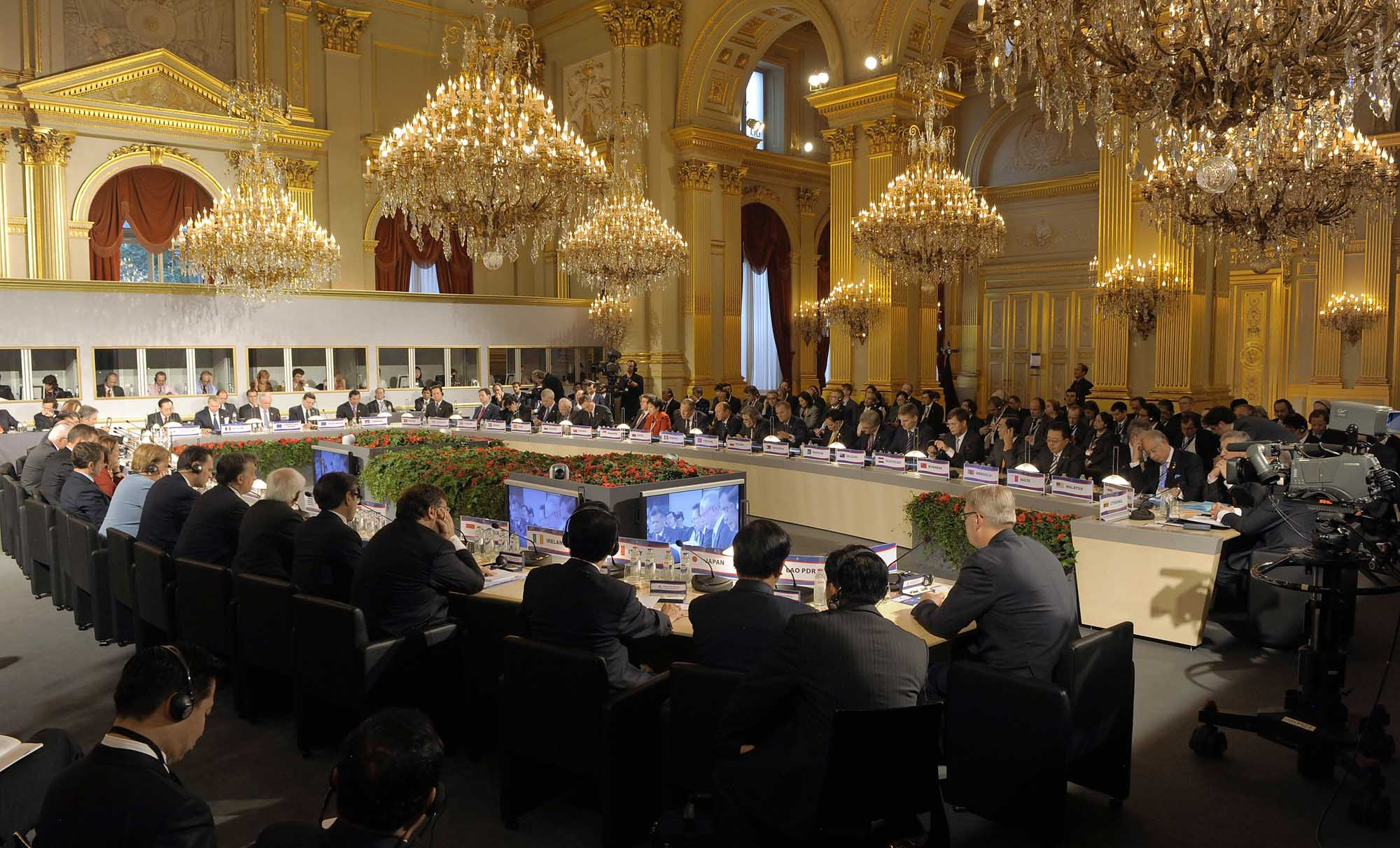
The Throne Room during the opening ceremony of the Asia–Europe Meeting in 2010

== See also ==
- List of castles and châteaux in Belgium
- Royal Trust (Belgium)
- Neoclassical architecture in Belgium
- History of Brussels
- Culture of Belgium
- Belgium in the long nineteenth century
