= Ghislain-Joseph Henry =

Belgian architect and landscape architect

Ghislain-Joseph Henry (1754-1820) was an architect, garden designer and topiarist, notable for his work for Louis XVI, the Holy Roman Emperor, Napoleon, and William I of the Netherlands.

== Life ==
He was born in Dinant (then in the Principality of Liège) in 1754 into a family which originated in Profondeville (Namur). He won first prize for architecture in the Clementine Competition at the Academy of Saint Luke in 1779 and studied at the Academy of Saint Luke in Rome. In 1803 he became one of the founder members of the Société de peinture, sculpture et architecture de Bruxelles and in 1816 he joined the academic council of the Académie royale des beaux-arts de Bruxelles.

== Works ==
=== Architecture ===
- 1786-1789 : Château de Duras, in Palladian style
- Major restoration, château de Laeken, of which he became curator
- Works, château de Seneffe.
- Portico, Enghien, for the duke of Arenberg.
- 1815-1829 : extensions to the Royal Palace of Brussels

=== Topiary ===
- Parc à l'anglaise, château de Wespelaar.
- Park and 'factories', château de Beauraing, owned by the duc de Beaufort Spontin.
- Design for a parc à l'anglaise, commanderie des Vieux Joncs.
