= Academy Palace =

Palace in Brussels, Belgium

- Palais des Académies (French); Academiënpaleis (Dutch)
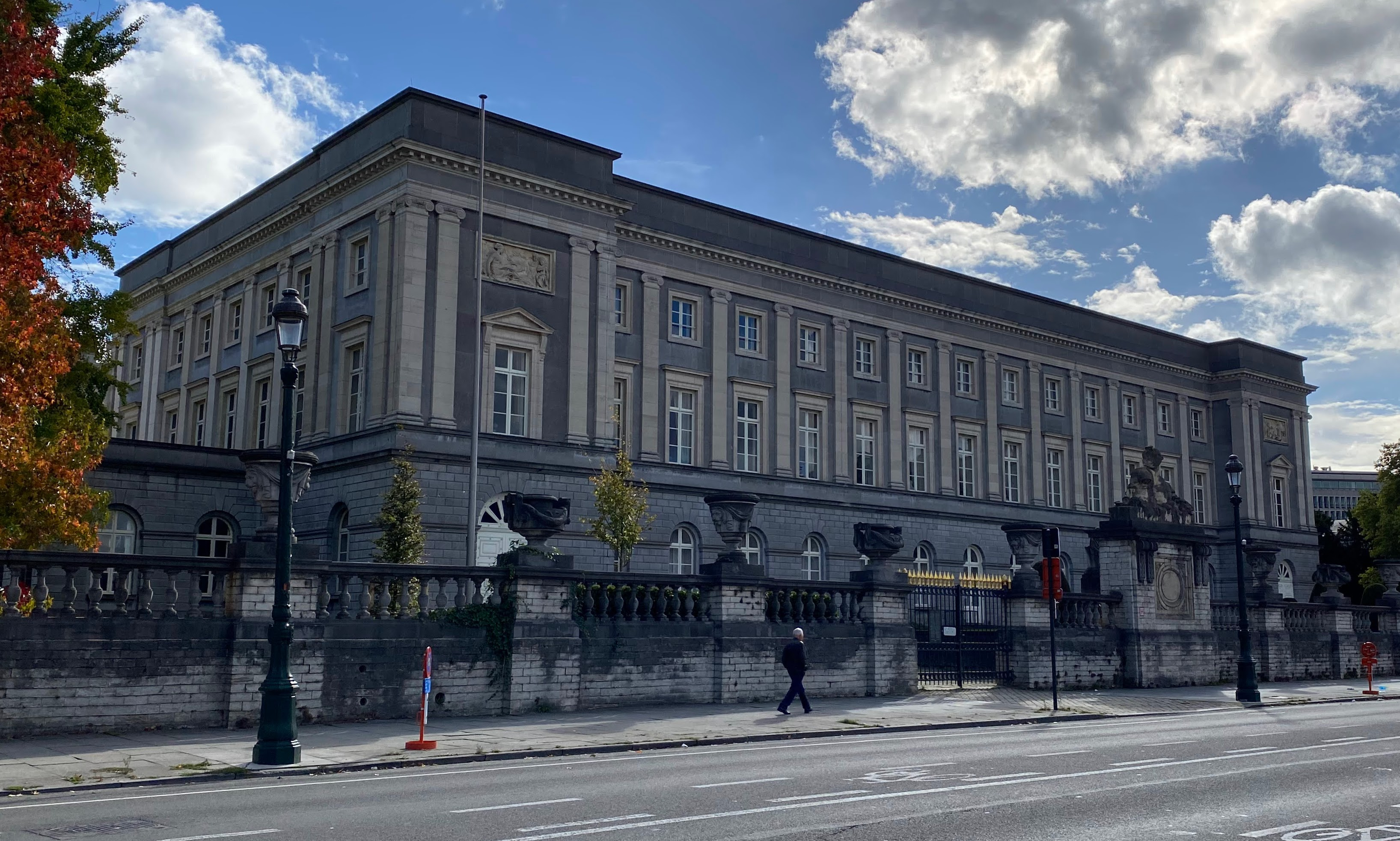
- Front view of the Academy Palace seen from the Rue Ducale/Hertogstraat
- Interactive map of the Academy Palace area
- Alternative names: Palace of the Academies; Academy House

General information
- Type: Palace
- Architectural style: Neoclassical
- Location: Rue Ducale / Hertogstraat 1, 1000 City of Brussels, Brussels-Capital Region, Belgium
- Coordinates: 50°50′33″N 4°21′56″E
- Current tenants: Belgian Royal Academies
- Construction started: 1823
- Completed: 1828
- Client: Prince William II of Orange

Design and construction
- Architects: Charles Vander Straeten, Tilman-François Suys
- Designations: Protected (10/10/2001)

Other information
- Public transit: Brussels-Central; 1 5 Parc/Park and 2 6 Trône/Troon

The Academy Palace or Palace of the Academies (French: Palais des Académies [palɛ dez‿akademi]; Dutch: Academiënpaleis [aːkaːˈdeːmijə(m)paːˌlɛis] or Paleis der Academiën [paːˈlɛiz dɛr ˌaːkaːˈdeːmijə(n)]) is a neoclassical palace in Brussels, Belgium. It was originally built between 1823 and 1828 for Prince William II of Orange. Nowadays, it houses five Belgian academies including the Royal Academies for Science and the Arts of Belgium (RASAB). In English, it is also sometimes called the Academy House.

The palace is situated on the Rue Ducale/Hertogstraat in the Royal Quarter (eastern part of Brussels' city centre), next to the Place des Palais/Paleizenplein, the Royal Palace of Brussels and Brussels Park.

== History ==
=== The Palace of William II ===
The rather austere neoclassical palace and its stables were built between 1823 and 1828 for Prince William II of Orange in recognition of his brilliant action on the battlefield at Waterloo, from funds granted by the nation. It was the joint work of two architects, Charles Vander Straeten and Tilman-François Suys, at a total cost of 1.2 million florins.

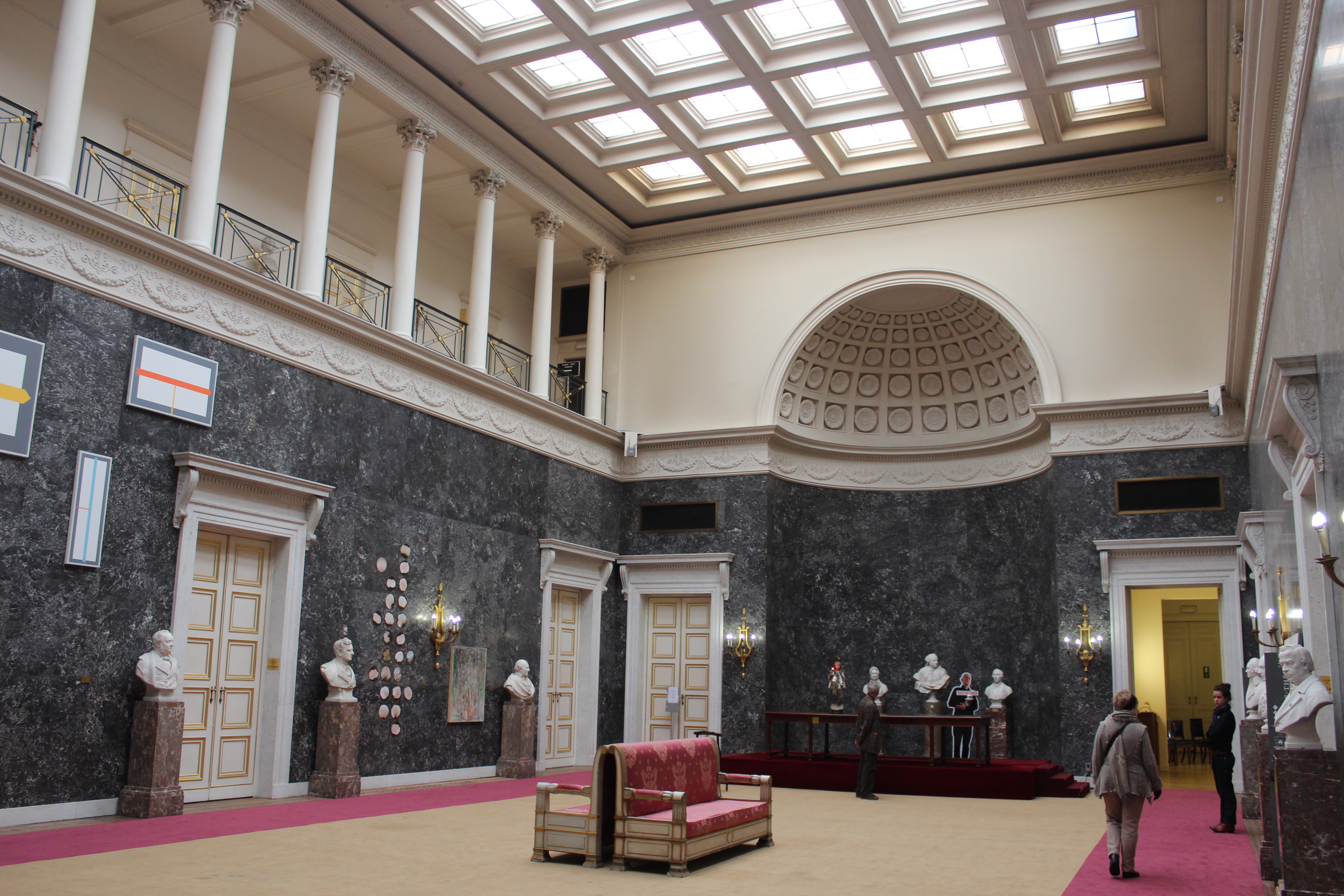
The main audience chamber in the palace, formerly the throne room

The princely family of William of Orange and his princess, Anna Pavlovna, sister of tsars Alexander I and Nicholas I, occupied the palace a scant two years before the Belgian Revolution of September 1830 forced them to flee to the Netherlands.

From 1830 to 1839, the palace was under sequestration by the newborn Belgian state, and a detailed inventory was drawn up. The public was allowed to tour the palace, and its interiors were considered the most sumptuous that had ever been seen in Belgium. An agreement on 5 November 1842 ceded the structure to the Belgian state, while its contents, adjudged the personal goods of William, were shipped to his Palace of Soestdijk in the Netherlands.

After housing the 1st Regiment of Chasseurs-Carabiniers in 1848–1852, and having been refused by the Duke of Brabant when offered to him in 1853, the palace remained in use for public festivities. The architect Gustave De Man, a member of the Académie royale de Belgique ("Royal Academy of Belgium"), was entrusted with transformations, finished in 1862, which fitted the building to house the Musée Moderne ("Modern Museum").

=== The Academy Palace (1876–present) ===
Through a royal decree issued on 30 April 1876, the palace was put at the disposal of the two existing French-speaking Belgian academies: the Royal Academy of Science, Letters and Fine Arts of Belgium (French: Académie royale des Sciences, des Lettres et des Beaux-Arts de Belgique), which had been founded in 1772, and the Royal Academy of Medicine of Belgium (French: Académie royale de Médecine de Belgique), founded in 1841. In 1892, it was used as venue for that year's International Monetary Conference. In 1925, the Academy of Medicine hosted in the Salle de Marbre the diplomatic negotiations of the second International Conference on the Unification of the Formulae for Potent Medicines, which resulted in the Second Brussels International Pharmacopoeia Agreement.

Three further academies came to share the space in the 20th century: the French-speaking Royal Academy of French Language and Literature of Belgium (French: Académie royale de langue et de littérature françaises de Belgique or ARLLFB), founded in 1920 by Jules Destrée; the Dutch-speaking Royal Academy of Science, Letters and Fine Arts of Belgium (Dutch: Koninklijke Academie voor Wetenschappen, Letteren en Schone Kunsten van België), founded in 1938 and called since 1999 the Royal Flemish Academy of Belgium for Science and the Arts (Dutch: Koninklijke Vlaamse Academie van België voor Wetenschappen en Kunsten or KVAB); and the Dutch-speaking Royal Academy of Medicine of Belgium (Dutch: Koninklijke Academie voor Geneeskunde van België), also founded in 1938.

On 10 October 2001, the palace was listed as a protected monument by the Monuments and Sites Directorate of the Brussels-Capital Region.

== Garden ==
The Academy Palace is surrounded by a garden adorned with quite a few sculptures, including a statue of the astronomer Adolphe Quételet by Charles-Auguste Fraikin (1880), busts of the chemist Jean Servais Stas by Thomas Vinçotte on a pedestal designed by Victor Horta (1897), and the lawyer and politician Jules Destrée by Armand Bonnetain (1937), as well as The Surprise, a work with a dog and a turtle by Jean-Baptiste Van Heffen (1869). Around the pond, on the side of the Rue de la Régence/Regentschapsstraat, there are three statues on high pedestals: a replica of The Discobolus by Mathieu Kessels (1867), The Victor by Jean Geefs, and Cain Cursed by Louis Jehotte (1850).

The garden is enclosed by a balustrade. At the entrance, two monumental allegorical lion sculptures by Félix Bouré flank the entrance gates. A young Auguste Rodin also contributed to the execution of the sculptural group on a pedestal, symbolising Science, Trade and Agriculture, by Antoine van Rasbourg (1874).

Academy Palace's sculptures

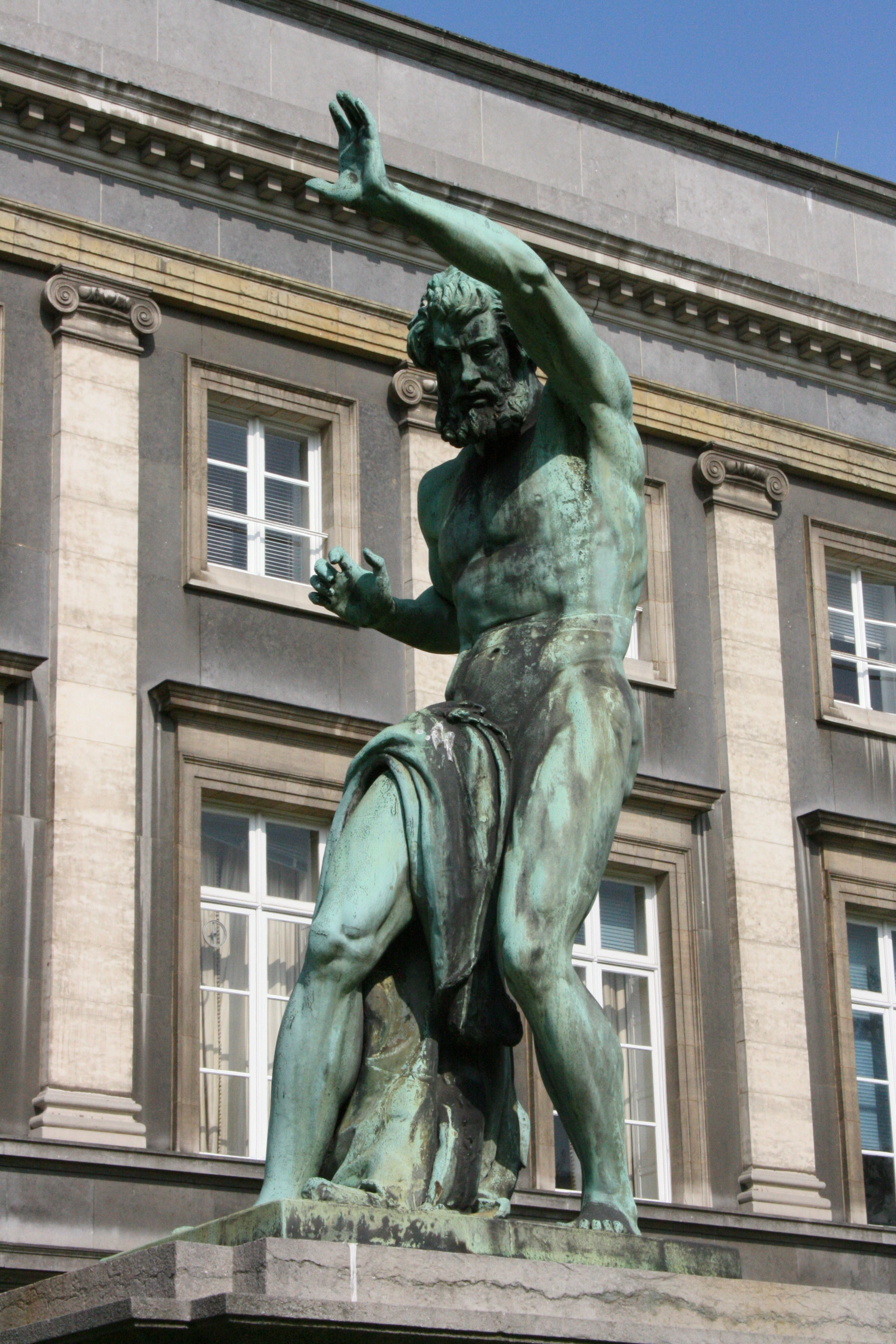
Cain Cursed by Louis Jéhotte (1850)

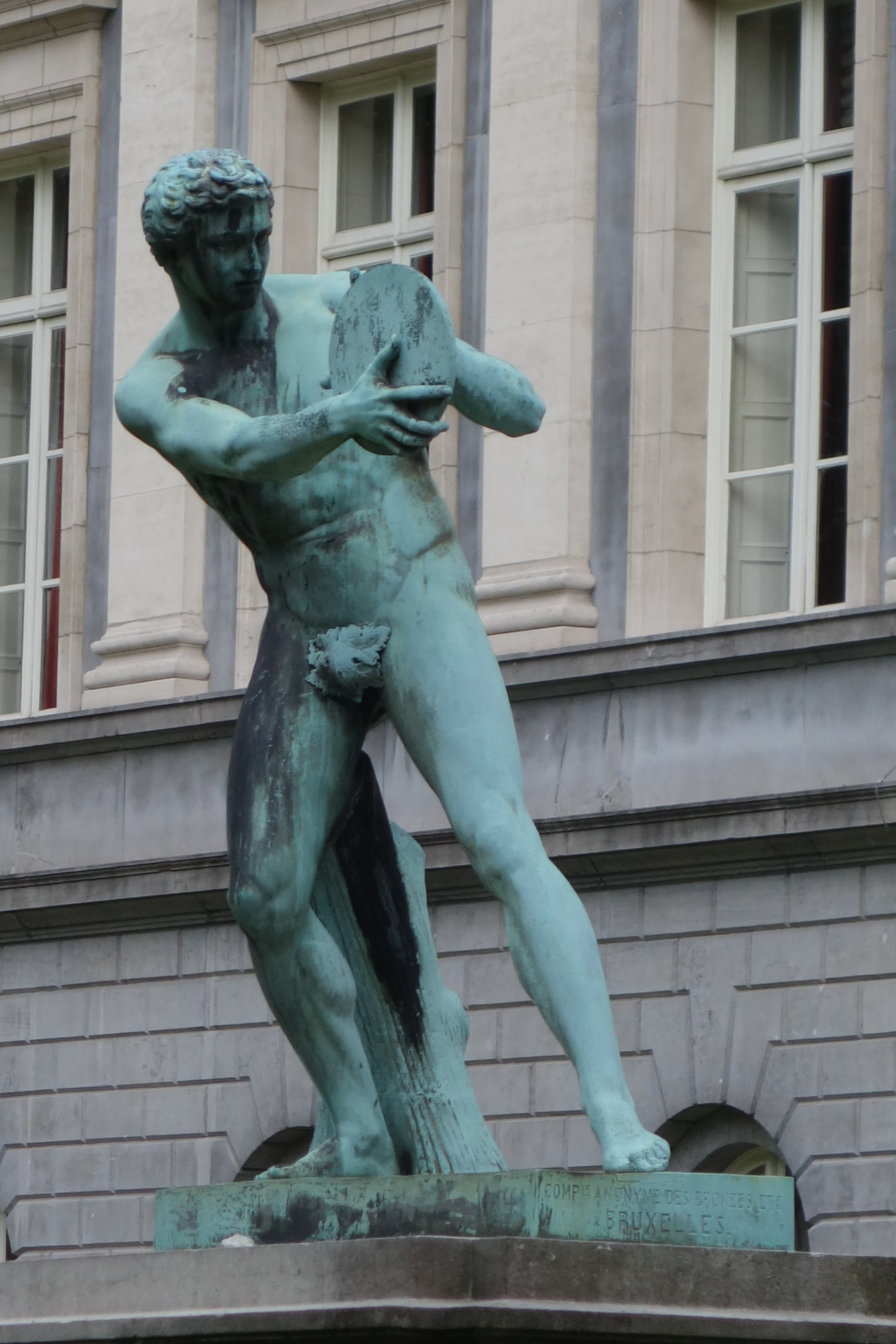
The Discobolus (1867), original by Mathieu Kessels (1824–25)

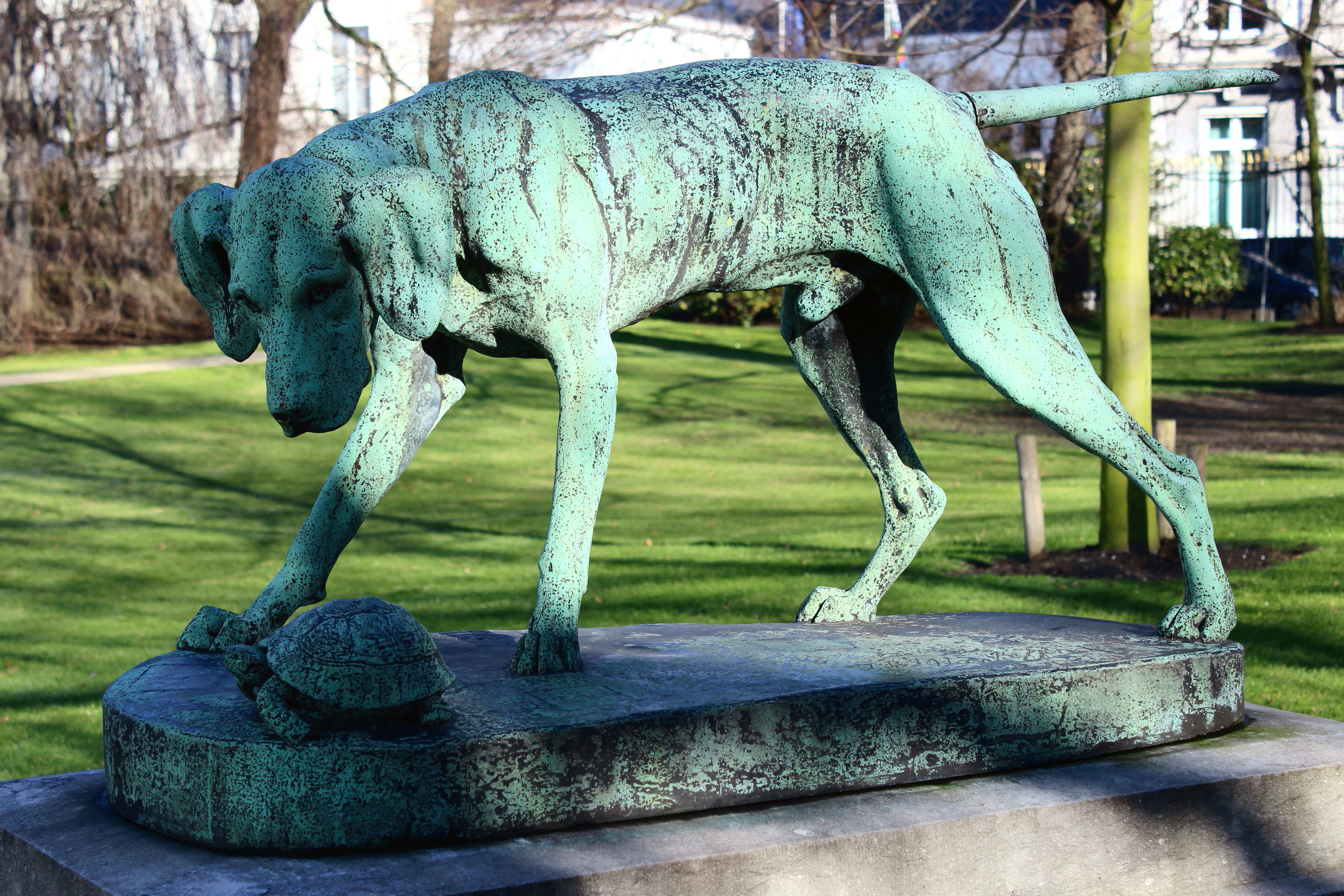
The Surprise by Jean-Baptiste Van Heffen (1869)

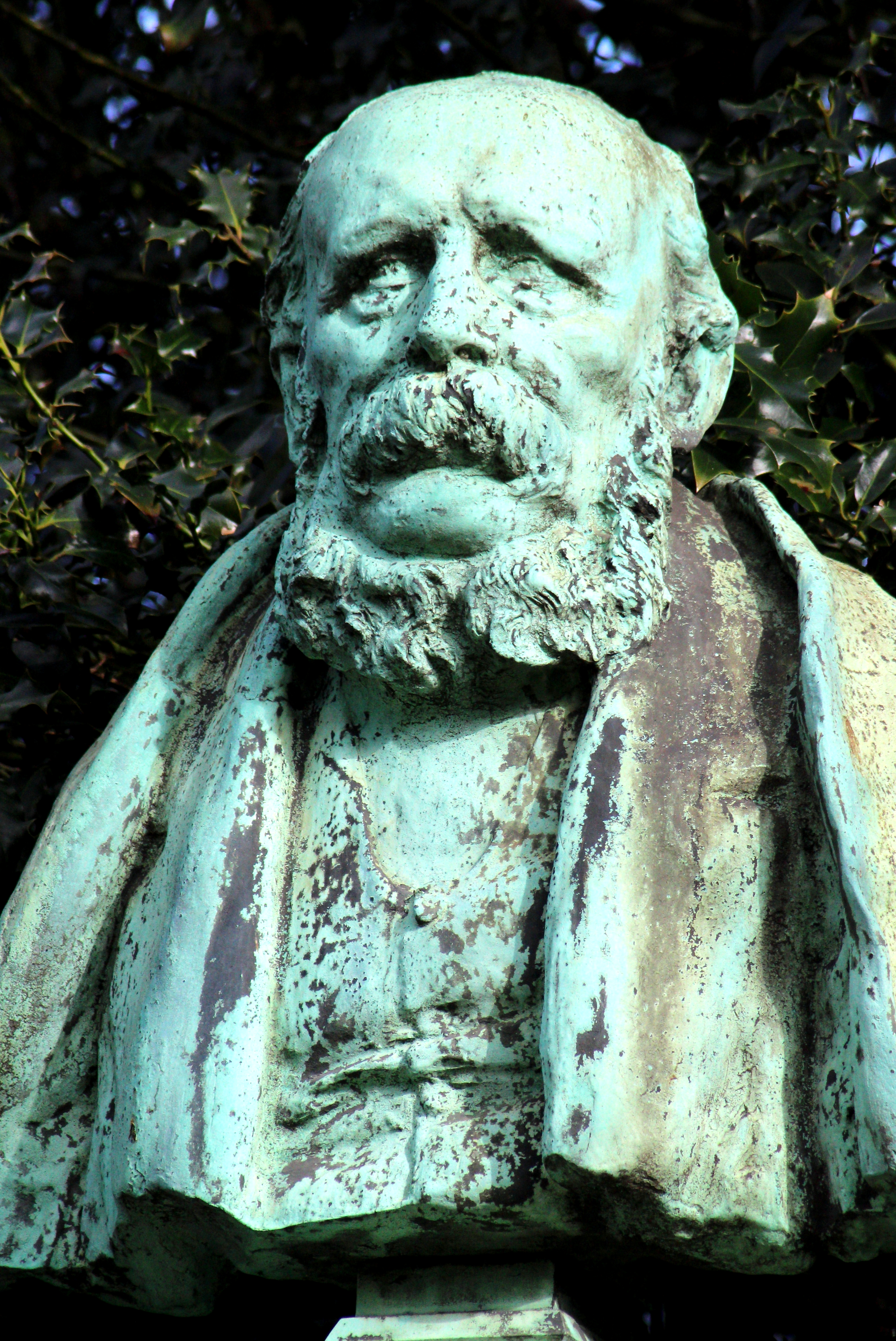
Bust of Jean Servais Stas by Thomas Vinçotte (1897)

== See also ==
- Royal Institute for Cultural Heritage
- List of castles and châteaux in Belgium
- Neoclassical architecture in Belgium
- History of Brussels
- Culture of Belgium
- Belgium in the long nineteenth century
