= Nassau Palace, Brussels =

Former palace of the House of Orange in Brussels

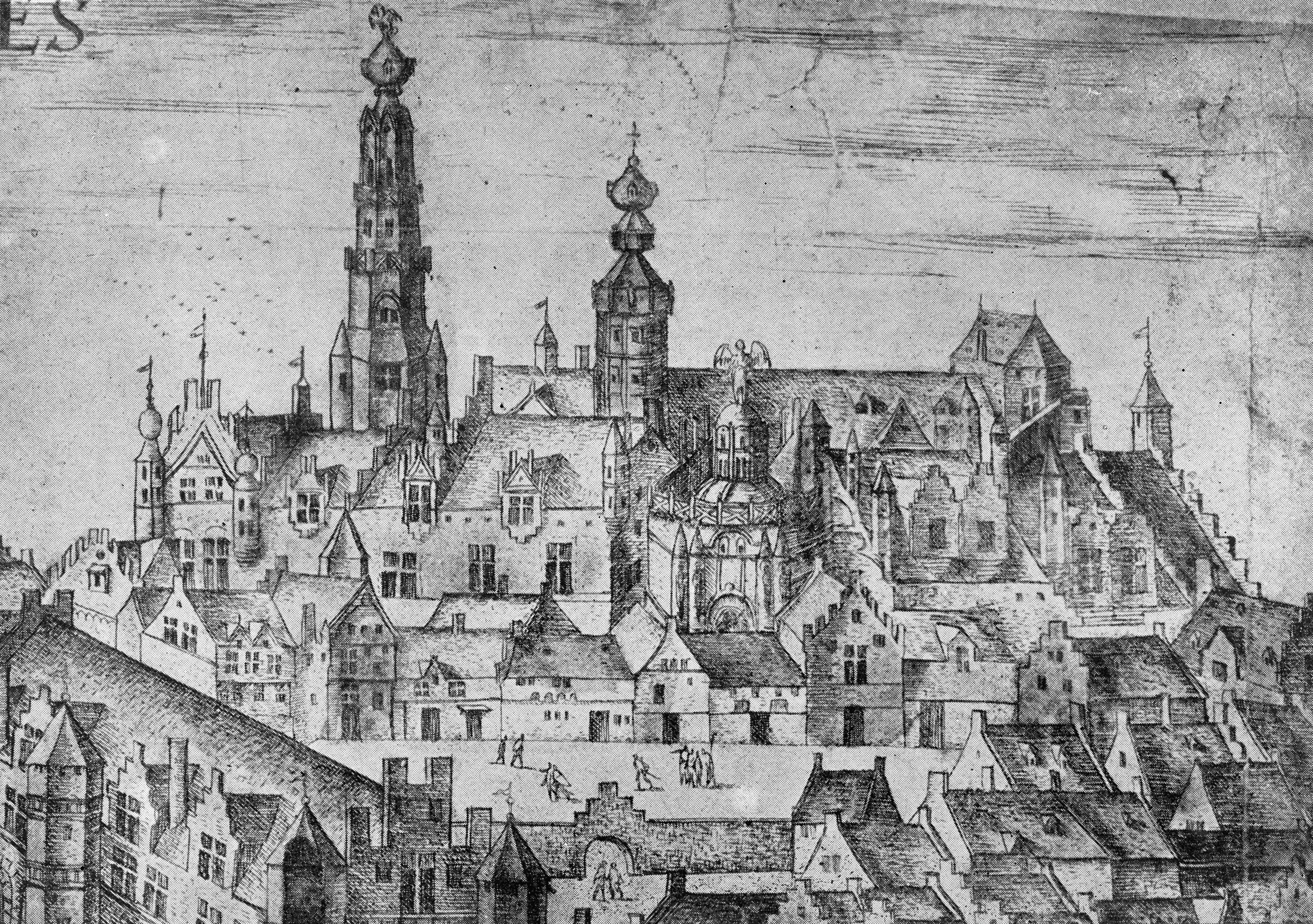
Nassau Palace seen from the north-east

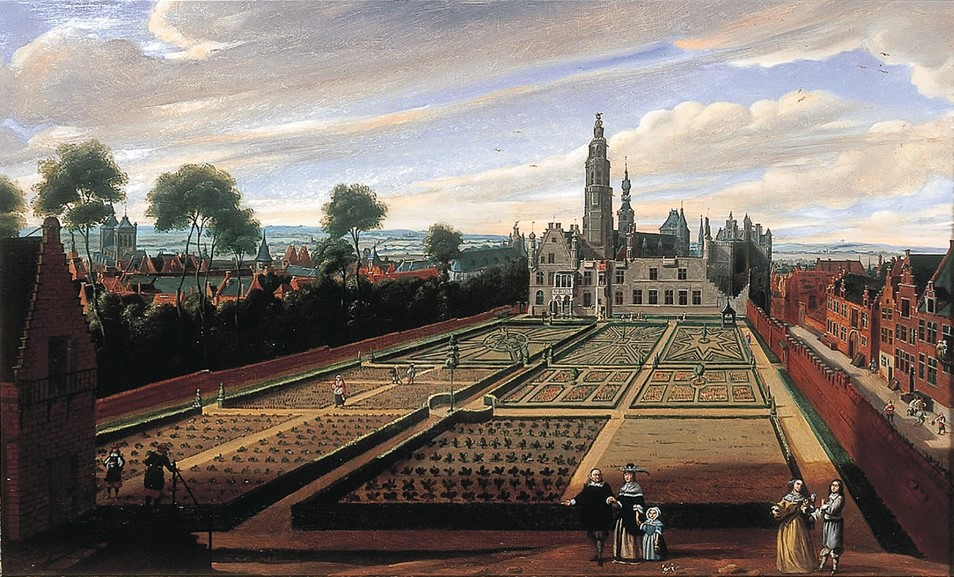
Nassau Palace and its gardens by Van Schoor and Gillis van Tilborch around 1658. The tower on the left was the so-called Dragon tower.

Nassau Palace (Dutch: Hof van Nassau; French: Hôtel de Nassau) was the former city palace of the House of Orange in Brussels. The palace was constructed in the 14th century and expanded in the following centuries. In the 18th century, it was acquired by Governor of the Habsburg Netherlands, Prince Charles Alexander of Lorraine, who replaced it with the Palace of Charles of Lorraine. Today, nothing remains except the chapel, which is part of the building of the Royal Library of Belgium (KBR).

== History ==
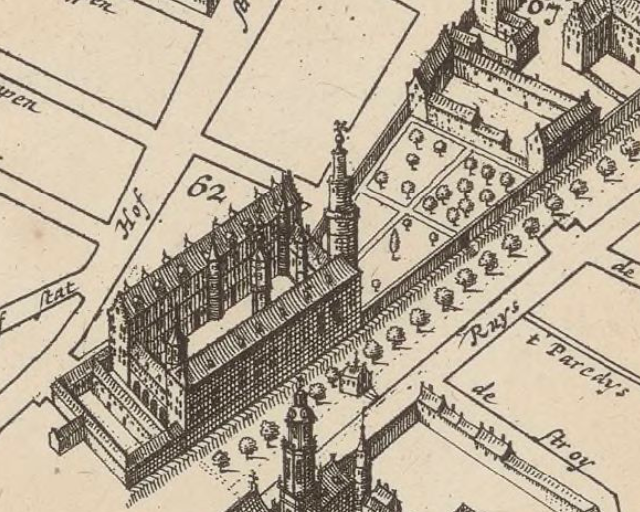
Nassau Palace on an old map of Brussels

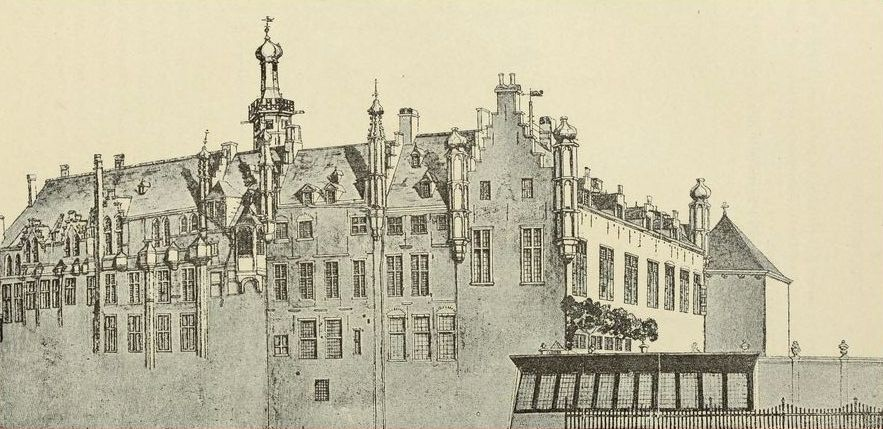
Nassau Palace seen from the Ruisbroekstraat in 1759

=== Middle Ages ===
The palace was built in a strategic location on one of the higher parts of Brussels, not far from the residence of the Dukes of Brabant, the Palace of Coudenberg. Construction began in the 1340s by the wealthy nobleman Willem van Duvenvoorde when he settled in Brussels. Because Willem van Duvenvoorde left behind twelve illegitimate children but no legitimate heirs, his possessions, including his Brussels residence, passed into the possession of the van Polanen family. It was then known as the Inn of the Lek.

Through the marriage in 1403 of the last descendant of the Polanen family, Johanna van Polanen, to Engelbert I of Nassau, the palace came into the possession of the House of Nassau. The presence of the counts of Nassau in the vicinity of the Palace on the Coudenberg—the residence of the then rulers of the Burgundian Netherlands, the House of Valois-Burgundy—greatly contributed to the growth of their political influence in the 15th and 16th centuries. Between 1480 and 1520, the palace was extensively renovated by Engelbert II of Nassau and his successor Henry III of Nassau-Breda. Architects included Loys van Boghem, Laurens Keldermans, and Hendrik van Pede (1503).

=== Henry III of Nassau-Breda ===
The Garden of Earthly Delights once decorated the walls of the Nassau Palace

Under Henry III, the palace became a meeting place for the crowned heads of Europe, as well as for artists and writers. In 1517, the secretary of Cardinal Luigi d'Aragona, the Italian Antonio de Beatis, described the palace. He not only described the numerous trompe-l'œil doors but also a gigantic bed that Henry had made to throw drunken guests into during one of his many banquets. De Beatis also mentioned various paintings in the palace, such as the triptych The Garden of Earthly Delights by Hieronymus Bosch (in the Great Hall) and a Judgment of Paris with the three goddesses, presumably painted by Lucas Cranach the Elder.

In 1520, the palace was visited by the German painter Albrecht Dürer, who mentioned a "well-painted" work by Hugo van der Goes in the chapel (probably The Seven Sacraments, a lost altarpiece). Dürer also mentioned, like De Beatis, the large bed, which according to him accommodated 50 people, and he was shown the meteorite that supposedly fell next to Henry III in a field.

=== William of Orange ===
After Henry's death, the palace passed into the hands of René of Chalon and then to William of Orange, both princes of Orange. William lived in great splendour there. No less than 24 squires were at his disposal, and his court was considered the most prestigious gastronomic school in Europe. Due to the splendid feasts he held, his debt at one point amounted to 900,000 florins. The palace also contained an art gallery, which inventories from 1568 and 1618 provide insight into. The latter list mentions 56 paintings and tapestries.

William supported the uprising against Spain in 1568 and saw his possessions confiscated. The Brussels palace was seized, and the newly arrived Fernando Álvarez de Toledo, 3rd Duke of Alba took up residence there. Afterwards, the palace served as the residence of regent Peter Ernst I von Mansfeld-Vorderort (1517–1604).

In 1601, the measure was lifted in favour of Orange's eldest son, Philip William, Prince of Orange (1554–1618), who had become a steadfast Catholic in Spain and was allowed to reclaim the ancestral home upon his return to Brussels.

=== 17th century ===
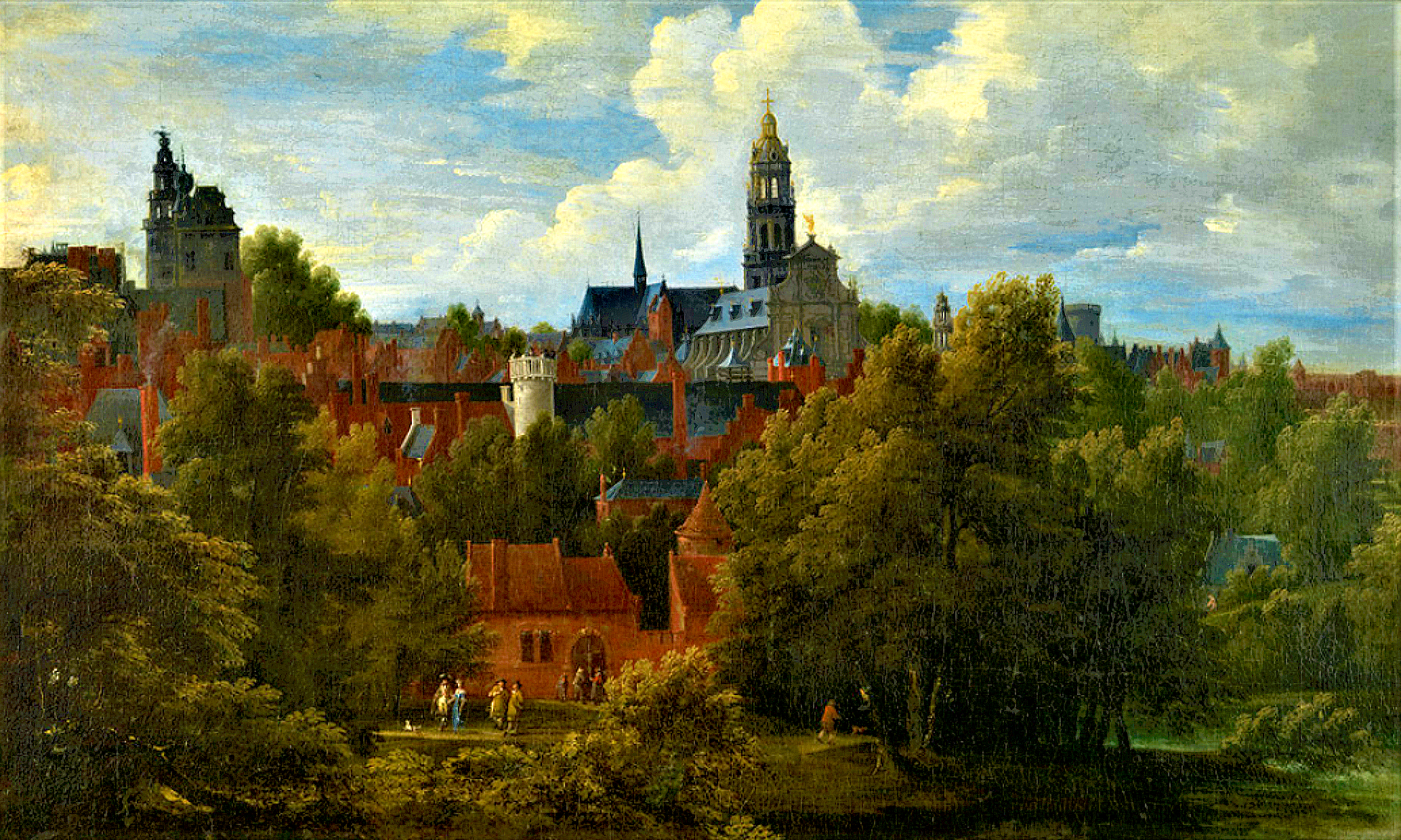
View of Brussels with the Nassau Palace on the left

From this time comes a testimony from the French traveler Pierre Bergeron. He was in Brussels in 1612 and remembered, in his unpublished manuscript Itinéraire germano-belgique, especially the ubiquitous slogans in the palace: the proud Ce sera moy Nassau and the actual motto, a sailing ship with Tardando progredior ("I advance by delaying").

Upon Philip William's death, the palace was awarded to John VIII, Count of Nassau-Siegen (1583–1638), who once considered by the Habsburg governors as the head of the House of Nassau. He was a successful army commander and married Princess Ernestine Yolande de Ligne (1594–1668). He also constructed the Castle of Ronse as a new ancestral castle of the Catholic branch of the Nassau family in the Southern Netherlands.

=== 18th century ===
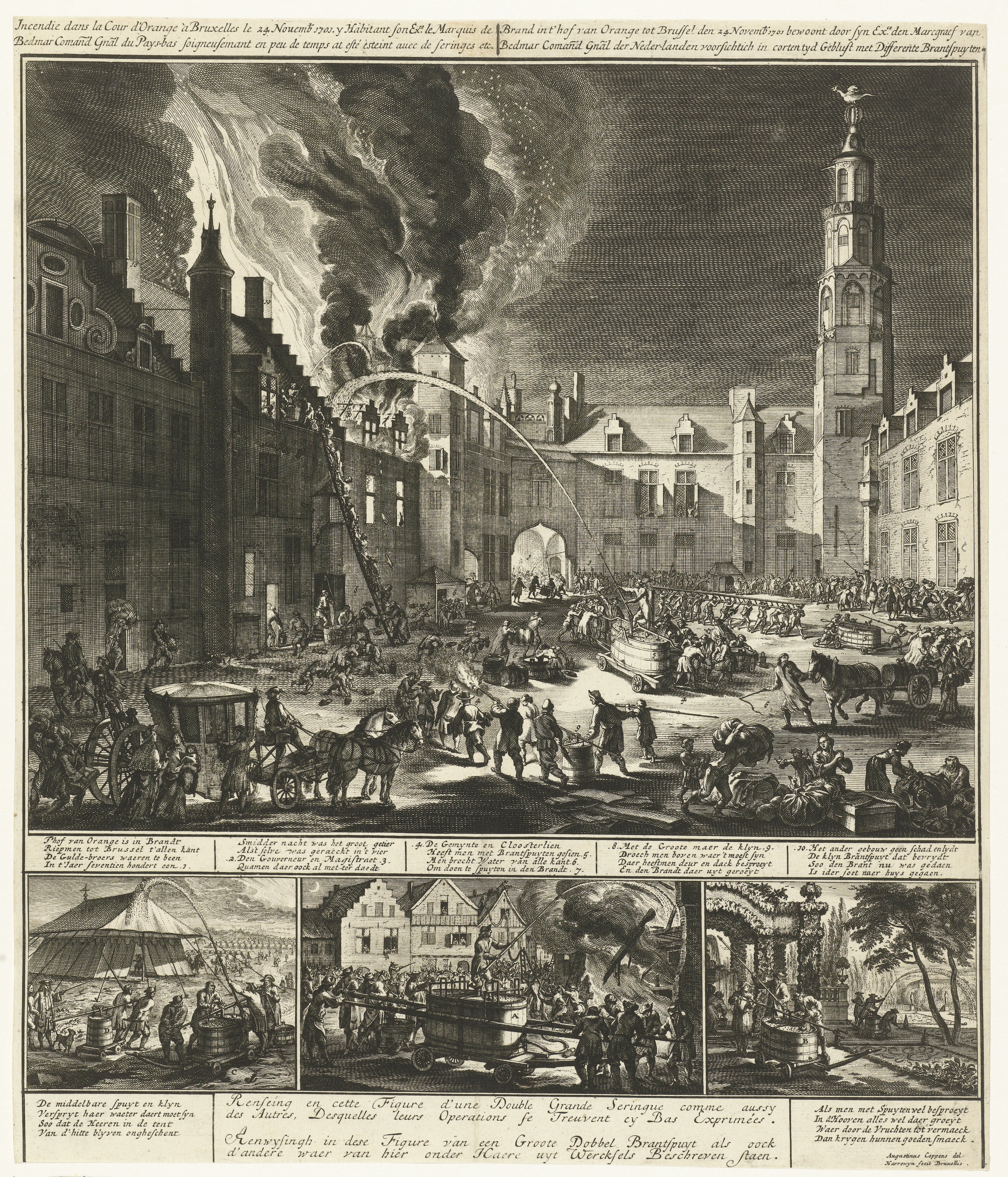
Nassau Palace on fire in 1701

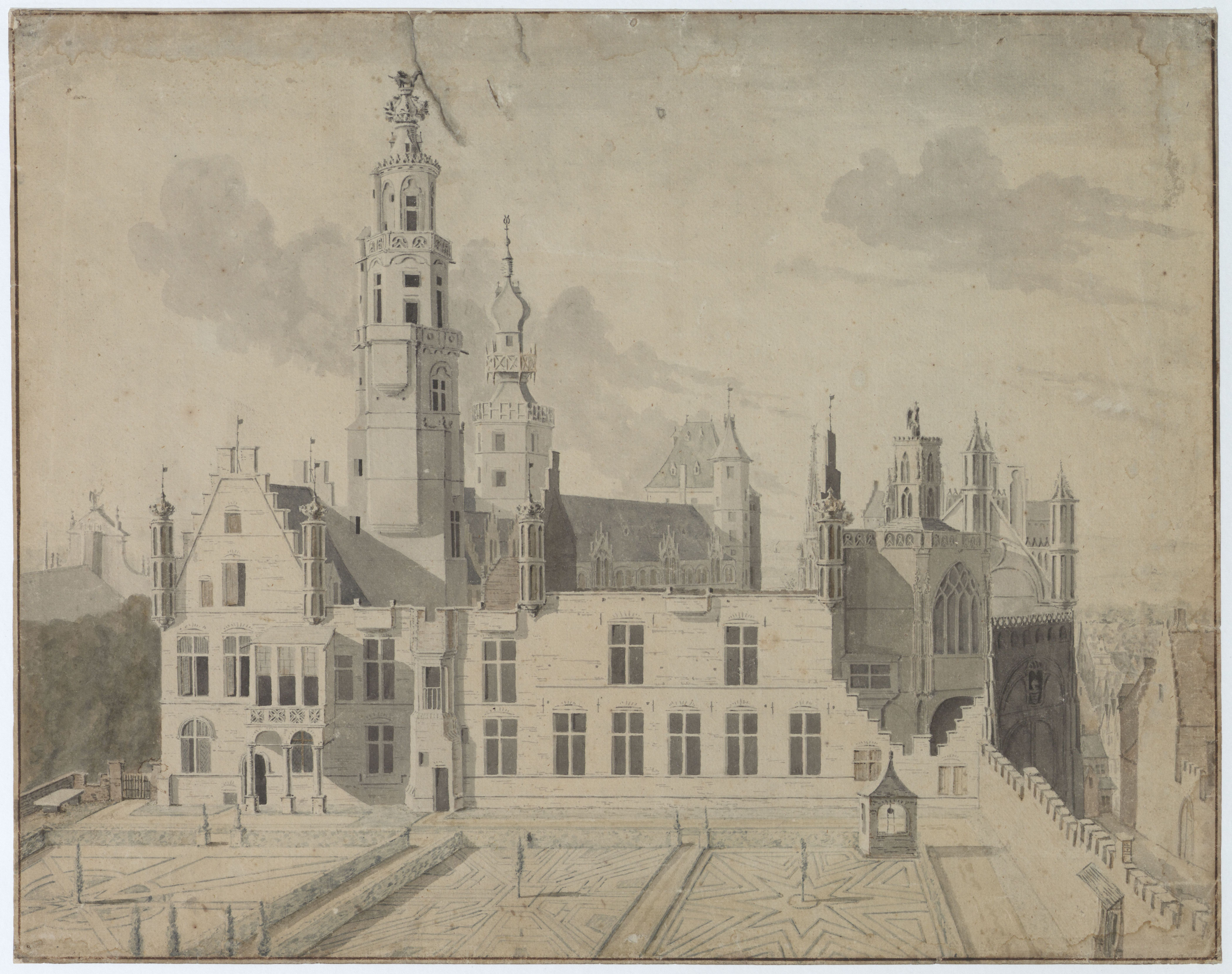
Nassau Palace from close by

At the start of the 18th century, the palace served as the residence of governor Marquess Isidoro de la Cueva y Benavides (1652–1723). During his stay, a fire broke out, but the firefighters were quickly on the scene and were able to extinguish the flames with their recently invented fire engine before much damage was done (1701).

In 1731, the nearby Palace on the Coudenberg was destroyed by fire, and the court moved to the Nassau Palace, which henceforth became known as the "New Court". Around 1750, Prince Charles Alexander of Lorraine began negotiations to purchase the Nassau Palace. The palace was dilapidated and no longer adapted to the tastes of the time. It was sold for a small sum and almost completely demolished (except for the chapel) to make way for a neoclassical residence for the governors-general of the Austrian Netherlands (see Palace of Charles of Lorraine).

By 1797, the old garden of the palace had become a renowned botanical garden, first part of the Central School of Brussels and from 1822 operated by the Society of Flora. It had to make way for the Palais de l'Industrie nationale in 1825 after a few decades.

== What remains ==
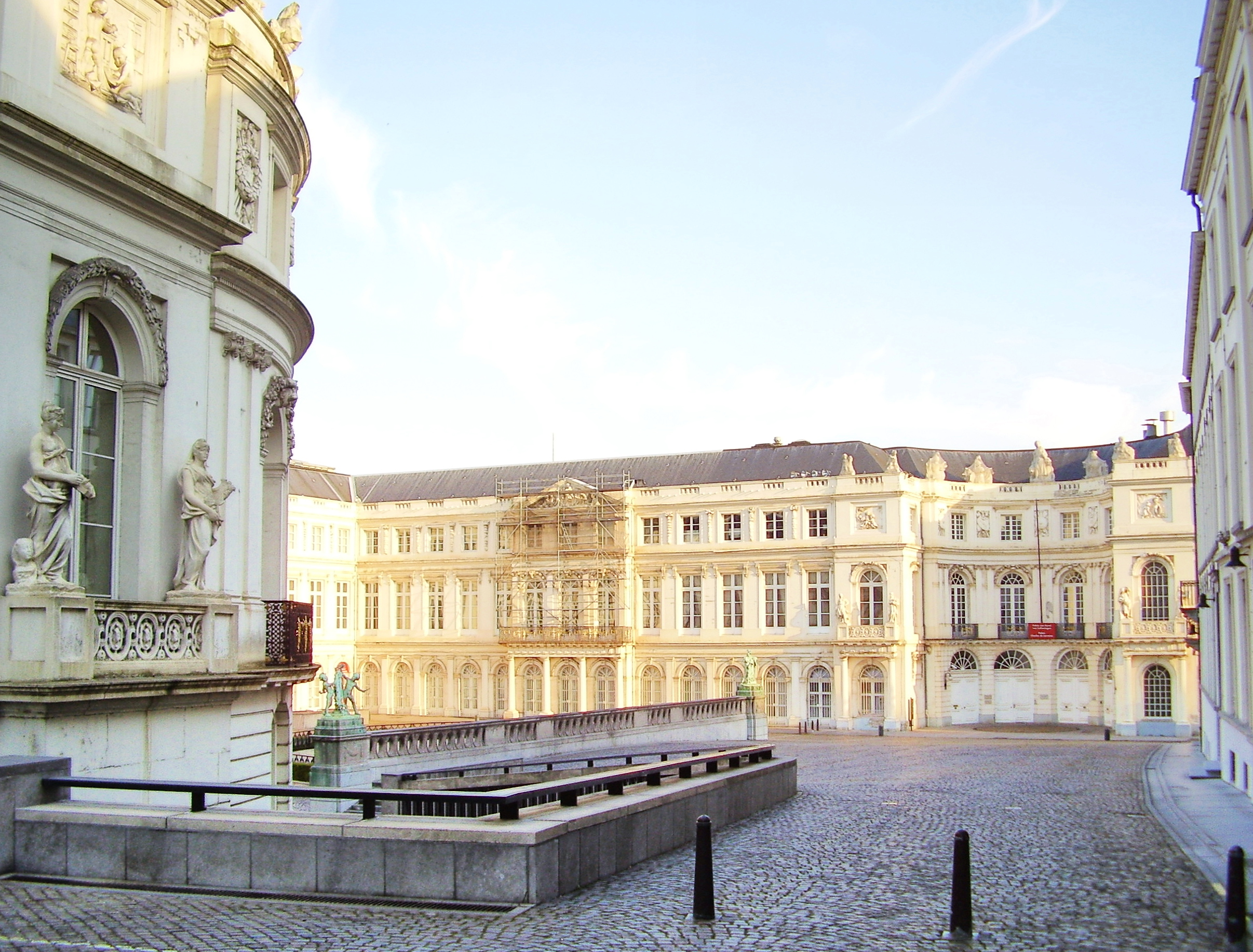
The Palace of Charles of Lorraine and the current Place du Musée/Museumplein replaced the Nassau Palace and its gardens.

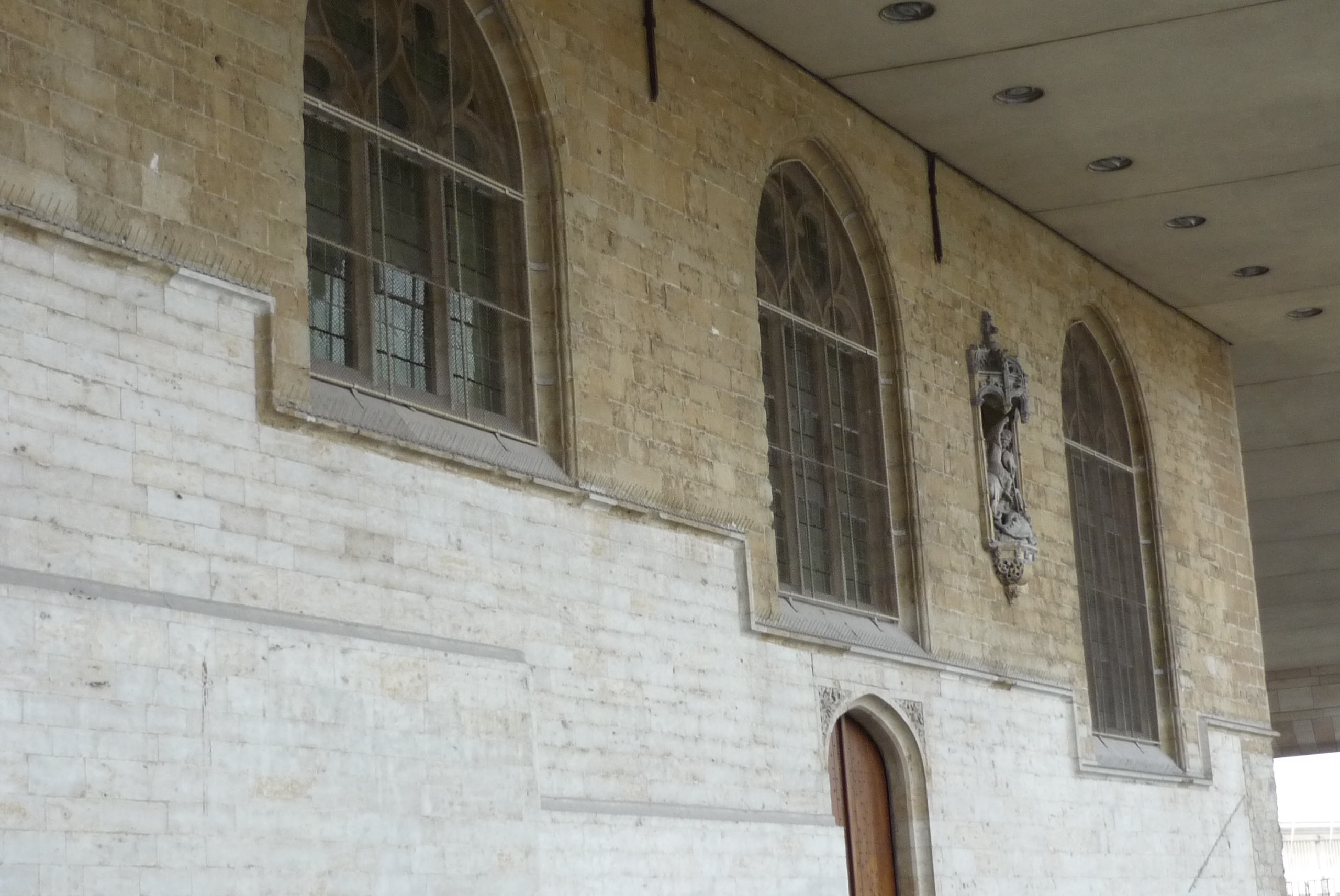
The court chapel is the only remaining part of the Nassau Palace.

The Nassau Chapel, dedicated to Saint George in Brabantine Gothic style, is the only part of the palace that remains. It is a 15th-century Gothic structure that likely stands on the site of the original chapel from 1344. A bas-relief by Georges Dobbels depicting the former appearance of the palace is located on the facade (1969).

In the 19th century, the chapel served successively as:

- A beer warehouse;
- A storage place for the sculptures of Mathieu Kessels;
- A laboratory for the Museum of Natural Sciences (the Bernissart Iguanodons were displayed there);
- A catalogue room for the International Institute for Bibliography of Paul Otlet;
- A reading room for the General State Archives.

In 1956, the chapel was enclosed within the modern buildings of the Albertine/Albertina on the Mont des Arts/Kunstberg, after relocation was first considered. The space is used for exhibitions.

The place of the former garden is now the Place du Musée/Museumplein.

== Literature ==
- Dumon, Pierre (1970). "La chapelle de Nassau". Brabant, revue trimestrielle de la Fédération touristique (in French). 5: 28–32.
- Belting, Hans (2002). "In the Palais Nassau". In Belting, Hans (ed.). Hieronymus Bosch. Garden of earthly delights. München: Prestel Verlag. p. 71. ISBN 3-7913-2674-0.
- Meijering, Stefan (2009). Het hof van Nassau te Brussel Een bouwgeschiedenis en reconstructie van een middeleeuws stadspaleis (Thesis). Gent: Universiteit Gent.
- Meijering, Stefan; Vannieuwenhuyze, Bram (2010). "Het Brusselse hof van Nassau De oprichting van een laatmiddeleeuwse stadsresidentie". Belgisch Tijdschrift voor Filologie en Geschiedenis (in Dutch). 88: 349–376.
