= Palace of Charles of Lorraine =

Palace in Brussels, Belgium

- Palais de Charles de Lorraine (French); Paleis van Karel van Lotharingen (Dutch)
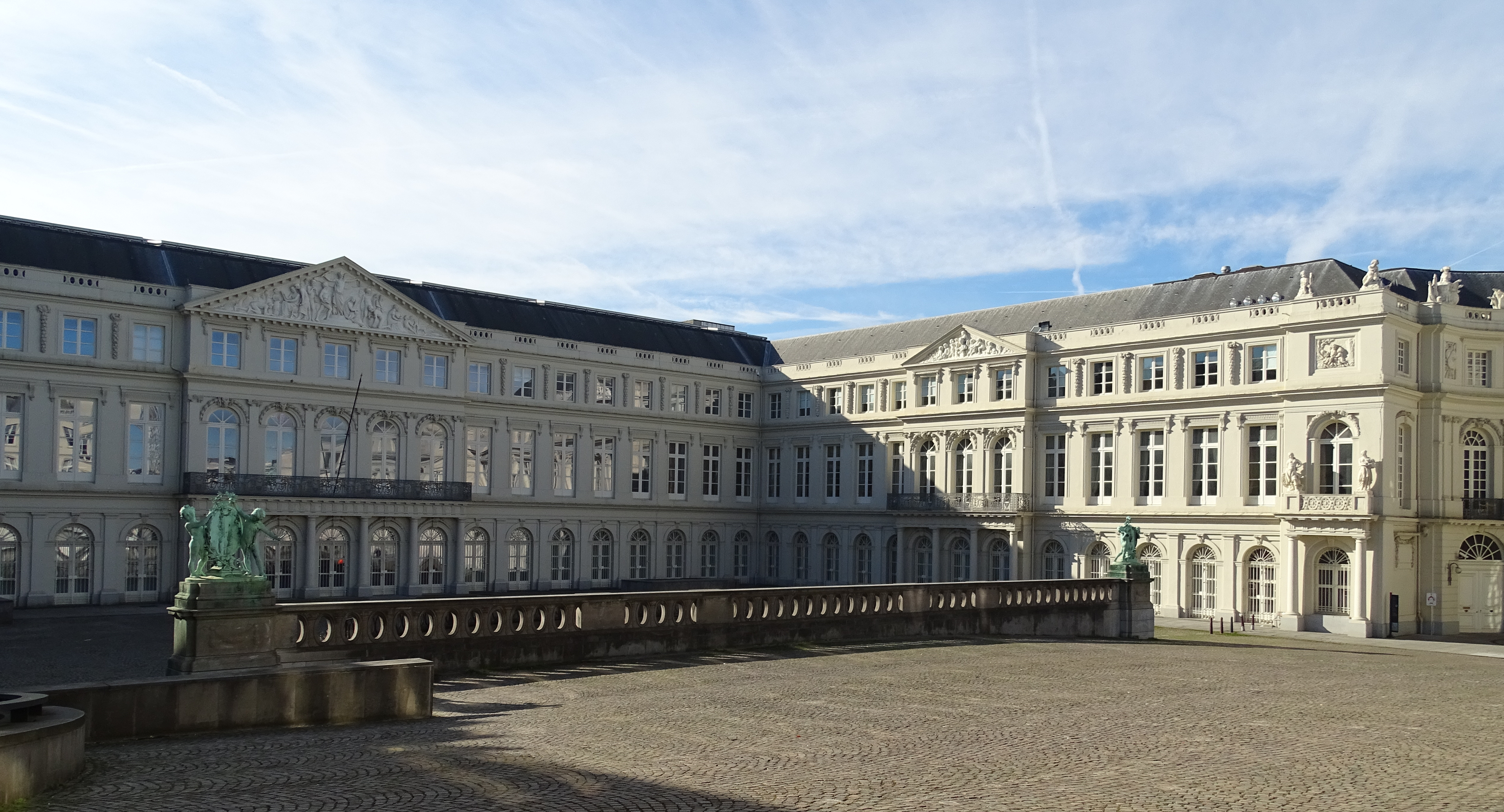
- Front view of the Palace of Charles of Lorraine seen from the Place du Musée/Museumplein
- Interactive map of the Palace of Charles of Lorraine area

General information
- Type: Palace
- Architectural style: Neoclassical
- Location: Place du Musée / Museumplein 1, 1000 City of Brussels, Brussels-Capital Region, Belgium
- Coordinates: 50°50′35″N 4°21′26″E
- Current tenants: Belgian Royal Library (KBR)
- Construction started: 1757
- Inaugurated: 1766
- Client: Prince Charles Alexander of Lorraine

Design and construction
- Architect: Jean Faulte

Other information
- Public transit: Brussels-Central; 1 5 Parc/Park and 2 6 Trône/Troon

The Palace of Charles of Lorraine (French: Palais de Charles de Lorraine; Dutch: Paleis van Karel van Lotharingen) is a neoclassical palace in the Royal Quarter of Brussels, Belgium. It was originally built between 1757 and 1766 for the Governor of the Habsburg Netherlands, Prince Charles Alexander of Lorraine, replacing the Palace of Orange-Nassau. It currently houses a museum, part of the Royal Library of Belgium (KBR).

Located on what is now the Place du Musée/Museumplein, the palace lies atop the Coudenberg hill, not far from the Place Royale/Koningsplein and the Mont des Arts/Kunstberg, as well as institutions such as the Royal Palace of Brussels and the Royal Museums of Fine Arts of Belgium.

== History ==
=== Inception and construction ===
The current palace's construction was started in 1757 on the site where the former Palace of Orange-Nassau, the Nassau Palace, had stood. It was to serve as the residence of Prince Charles Alexander of Lorraine, the Governor-General of what was then the Austrian Netherlands from 1744 until 1780. Indeed, in 1731, the nearby Palace of Coudenberg had been destroyed by fire and the court had moved to the Palace of Nassau, which from then on was known as the "New Court". An avid builder, Charles Alexander imagined grandiose projects for his capital. This old palace, however, was dilapidated and no longer adapted to the taste of the time. It was thus sold for little money and almost completely demolished (except for Saint George's Chapel), to make way for the new palace.

The first neoclassical wing, probably the work of the architect Jean Faulte, was completed by the architect Laurent-Benoît Dewez after Faulte's death in 1766. A second wing in the same style, designed by the French architect Nicolas Roget, was attached perpendicularly to the palace in 1825 to house the Palace of National Industry, intended to host periodic exhibitions supported by the sovereign of the United Kingdom of the Netherlands, William I. Its construction coincided with the completion of the first section of the Rue de la Régence/Regentschapsstraat, which temporarily ended at the foot of the Church of Our Lady of Victories at the Sablon.

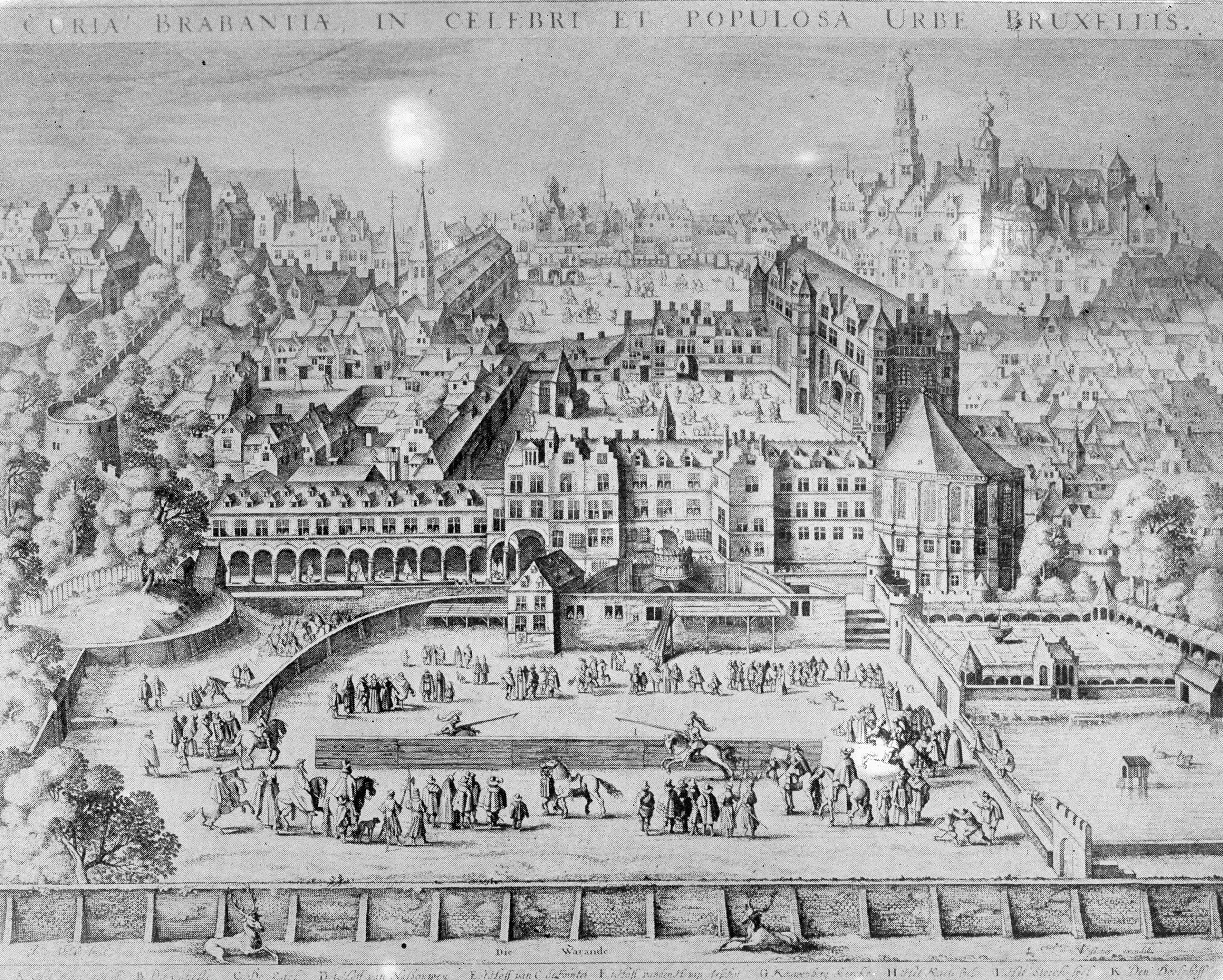
View of the Court of Brabant and the Court of Nassau, engraving by Jan van de Venne, early 17th century

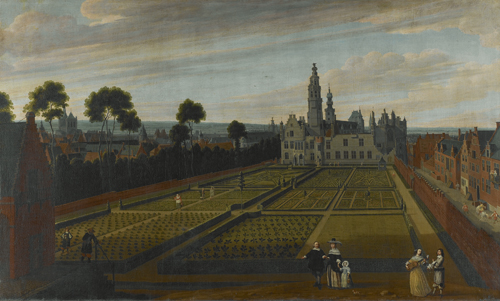
The Palace of Nassau in Brussels, Guilliam van Schoor and Gillis van Tilborgh, 1658

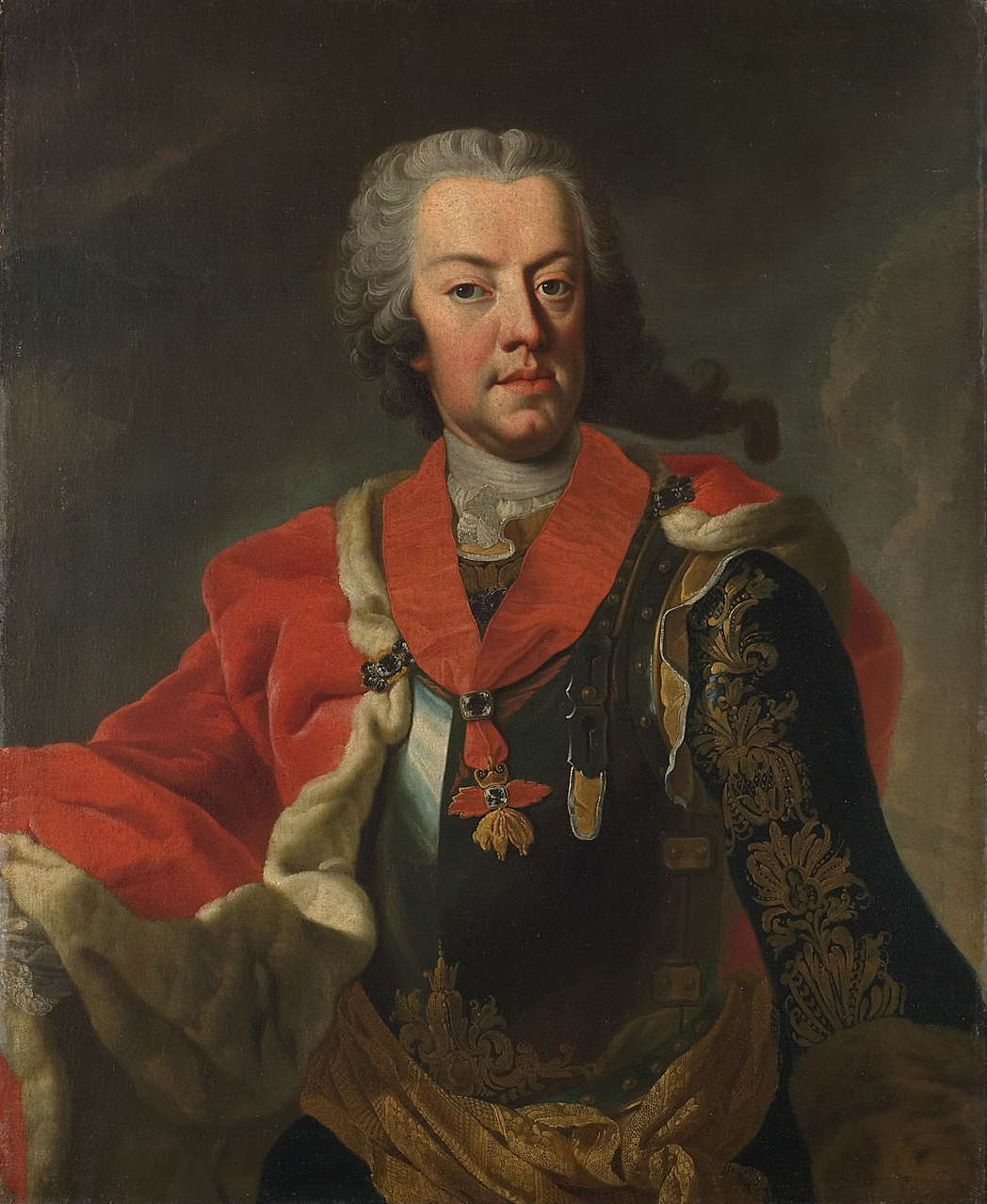
Portrait of Prince Charles Alexander of Lorraine, Martin van Meytens, c. 1743

=== Later usage and renovation ===
During the French period, the City of Brussels bought the palace to install a library, an art gallery and a cabinet of physics and natural history, constituting the Museum of the department of the Dyle, one of the fifteen departmental museums created under Napoleon's initiative, within the framework of the decentralisation of the Louvre in Paris. Bought by the Belgian state from the City of Brussels, these collections form the embryo of Belgian artistic and literary heritage that will gradually be concentrated around the current Place du Musée/Museumplein. In 1804, the royal chapel was entrusted by Napoleon to the Protestant community of Brussels and became Brussels Protestant Church. It has largely retained its original appearance.

Until 1878, the Brussels Salon, a periodic exhibition of work by living artists, took place in the former apartments of Charles Alexander of Lorraine. This situation was not ideal because the permanent collection had to be temporarily stored or covered during the exhibition. In addition, the exhibitors complained that all paintings were not lit equally well. Renovation works were carried out so that in 1830 a Grand Gallery could open with a skylight. Nevertheless, low-hanging works were still difficult to see. In 1851, the exhibition was held in a temporary construction in the courtyard, before returning to its traditional location until 1881, when the first rooms of the new Museum of Fine Arts could be used. This museum remained the location for all subsequent editions.

Following Belgian independence, the Royal Library of Belgium (KBR), founded in 1837, gradually took over the premises. It moved successively into the museum of painting and sculpture, then into the Palace of National Industry. The first was set up in the new museum on the Rue de la Régence and the second, which became the Museum of Industry, joined the Cinquantenaire Museum. Even the new wing, built at the rear of the Museum of Fine Arts by the architect E. Willame in 1879, to enclose the courtyard, was taken over by the administration and the numismatics cabinet of the Royal Library. Only the museum's contemporary art collections remained on site.

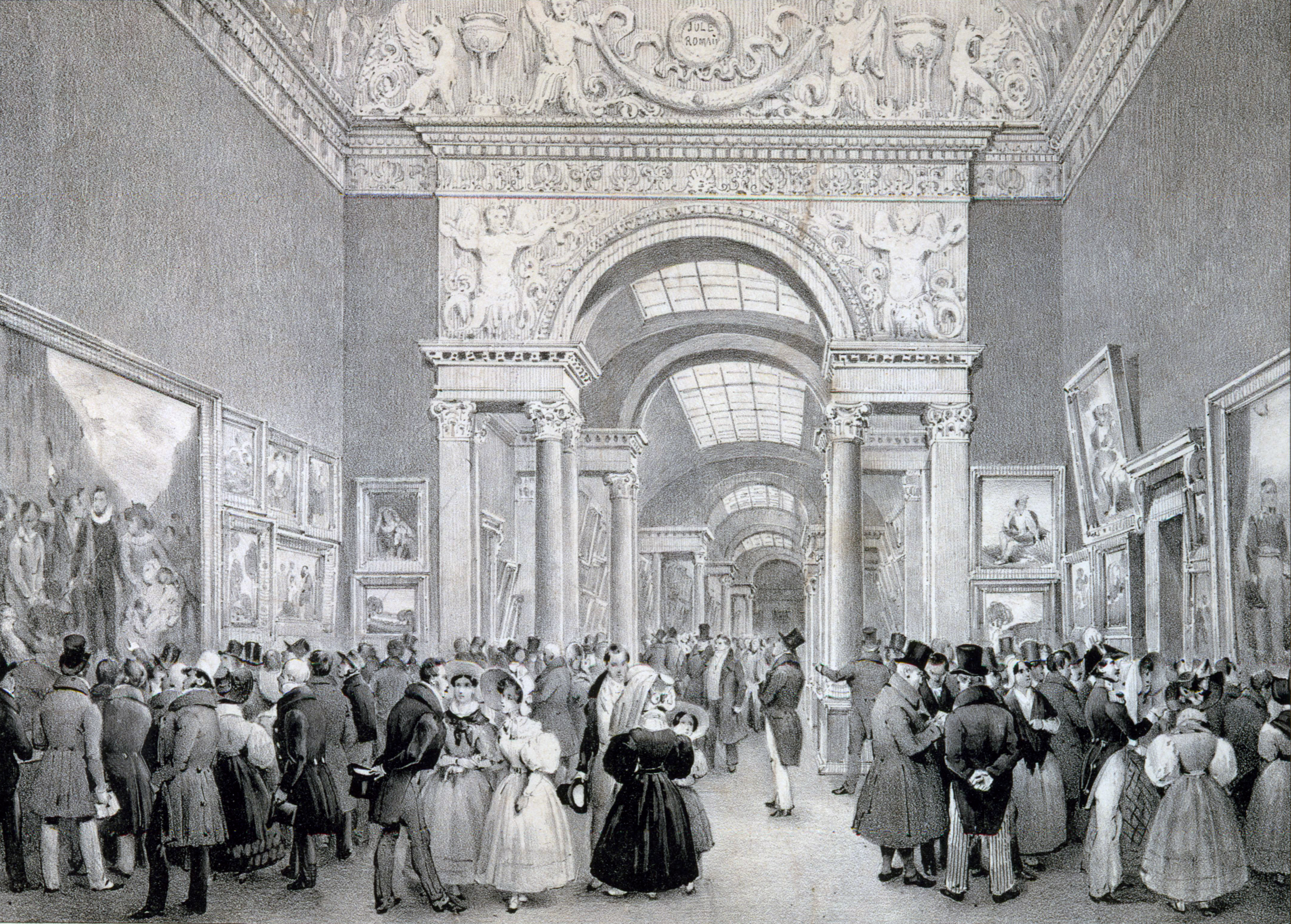
The Brussels Salon of 1830 in the palace's new Grand Gallery, rendered by Jean-Baptiste Madou

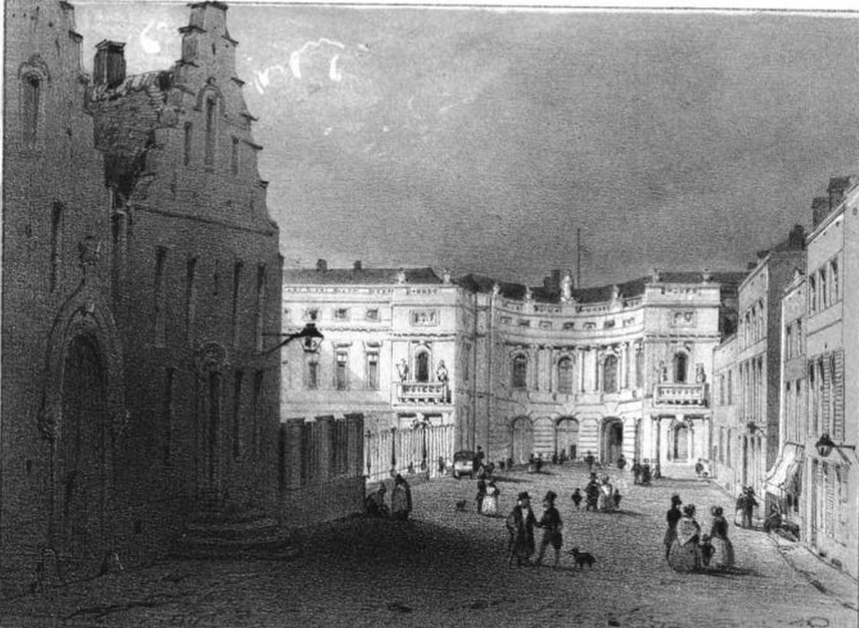
The palace in 1846, illustration from Guide pittoresque dans Bruxelles

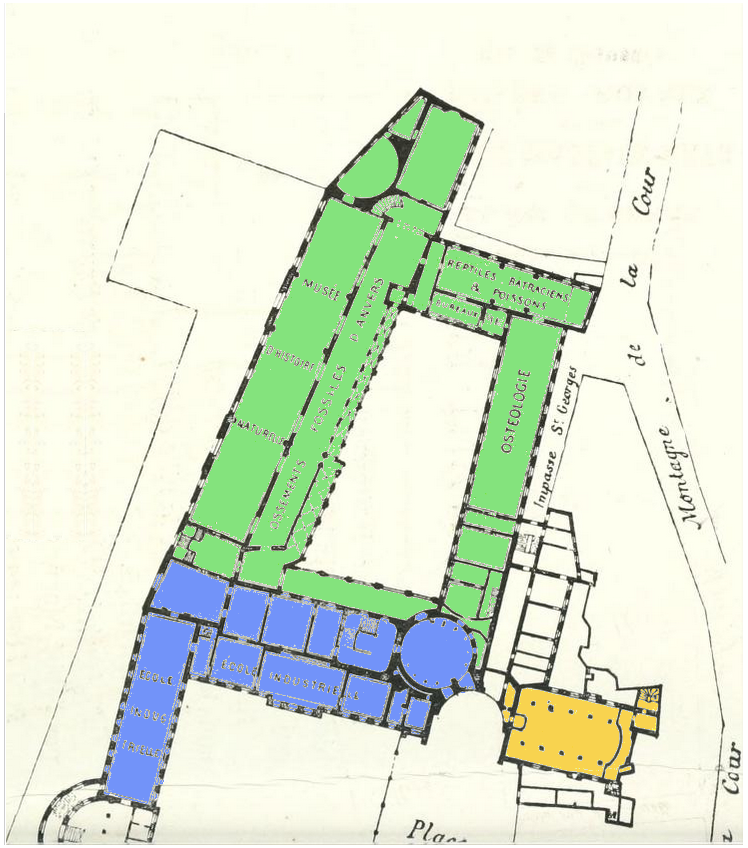
Map of the palace and Museums district in 1880

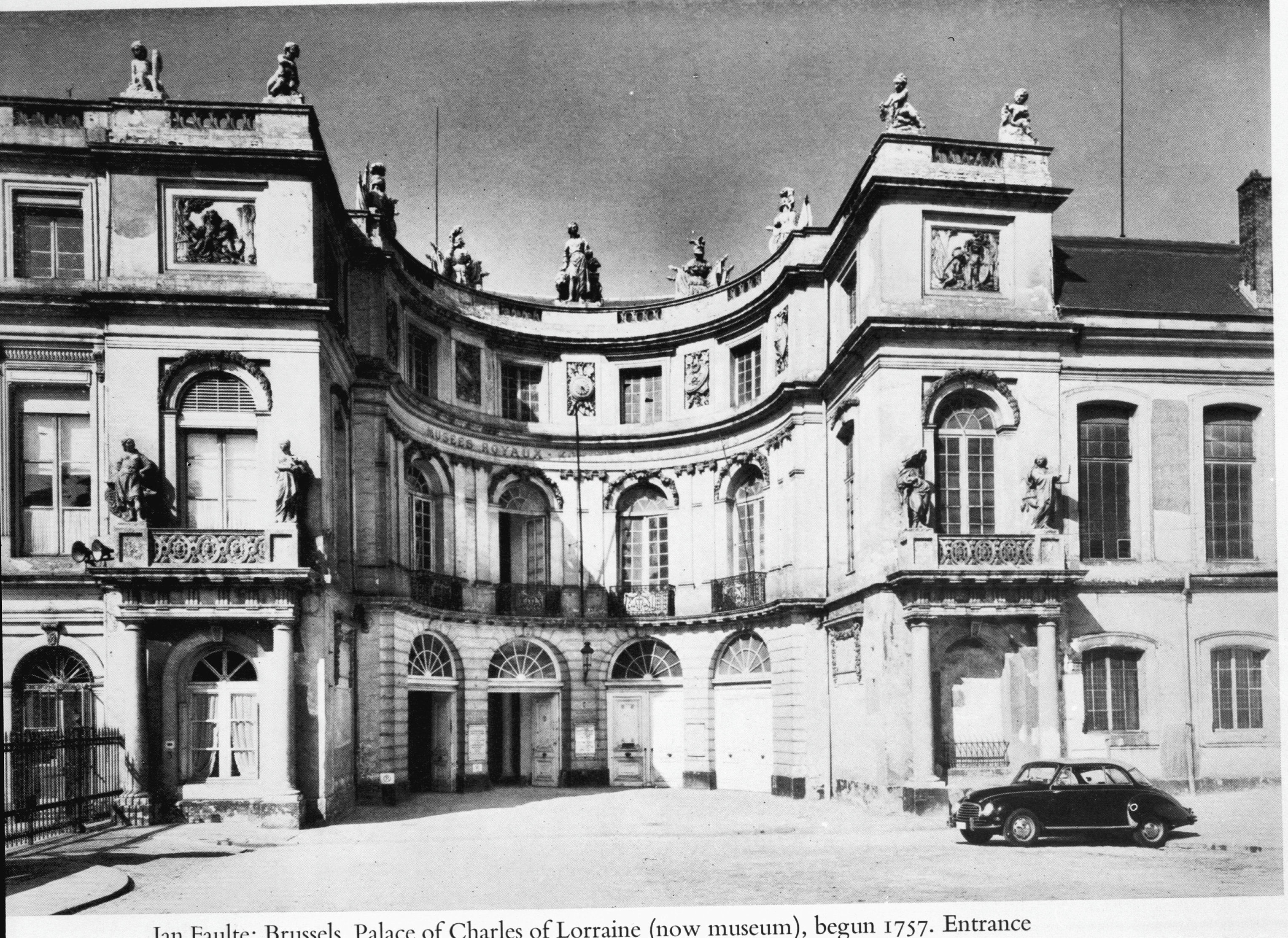
The palace in the 1950s

=== Contemporary (1960s–present) ===
With the construction of the Mont des Arts/Kunstberg complex in the 1960s, it was decided to demolish more than three quarters of the palace. Since then, once through the gate, the visitor discovers a space amputated in its original momentum, despite its fine quality. If some admirable salons have been preserved behind the façades, it is however possible to associate the heavy interventions of the 1960s with a façade operation. These demolitions removed all traces of the old Palace of Nassau from which the new wing was born, so that today only the uprooted extension remains.

On 22 November 2001, the palace was listed as a protected monument by the Monuments and Sites Directorate of the Brussels-Capital Region. It closed in 2017 for renovations, and reopened in 2019. Today, it serves as a museum for 18th-century items. The exhibits originate from the collections of the Royal Museum of Art and History (RMAH) and the Royal Library of Belgium (KBR). The palace also hosts the Royal Library's temporary exhibitions.

== Description ==
The Palace of Charles of Lorraine counts five halls, each decorated in stucco and silk, whose interiors are reminiscent of the Austrian Netherlands and the Prince-Bishopric of Liège in the 18th century. An impressive staircase, adorned with a statue of Hercules sculpted by the Flemish sculptor Laurent Delvaux, leads up to the first-floor rotunda. The rotunda's paving includes a central rosette made up of 28 types of Belgian marble, a sample of the Prince's collection of 5,000 minerals.

=== Royal Chapel ===
Donated to the Protestant Church by decree in 1804, with a definitive concession in 1816, the former private chapel of Prince Charles Alexander of Lorraine (also called the Royal Chapel) was integrated into the new constructions of the Mont des Arts/Kunstberg in 1965. Restored and modified several times, this sanctuary was built in 1760–61 and presents a Louis XVI-style interior with several Régence and Louis XV elements. It is adorned with rosettes, putty, rocaille-style elements and garlands. In the jubé, there is an organ by Bernhard Dreymann dating from 1839 to 1841.

=== Statue of Charles Alexander of Lorraine ===
Erected in 1848 at the centre of the Place du Musée, the statue of Charles Alexander of Lorraine was part of a series of sculptural works honouring great figures of Belgian history. Originally designed for Brussels Park, then for the Place Royale/Koningsplein, it had been ordered to the sculptor Louis Jehotte, also author of a statue of Charlemagne in Liège (Wallonia). Nowadays, the statue is relegated to the side of the square, above the technical block of the Museum of Modern Art.

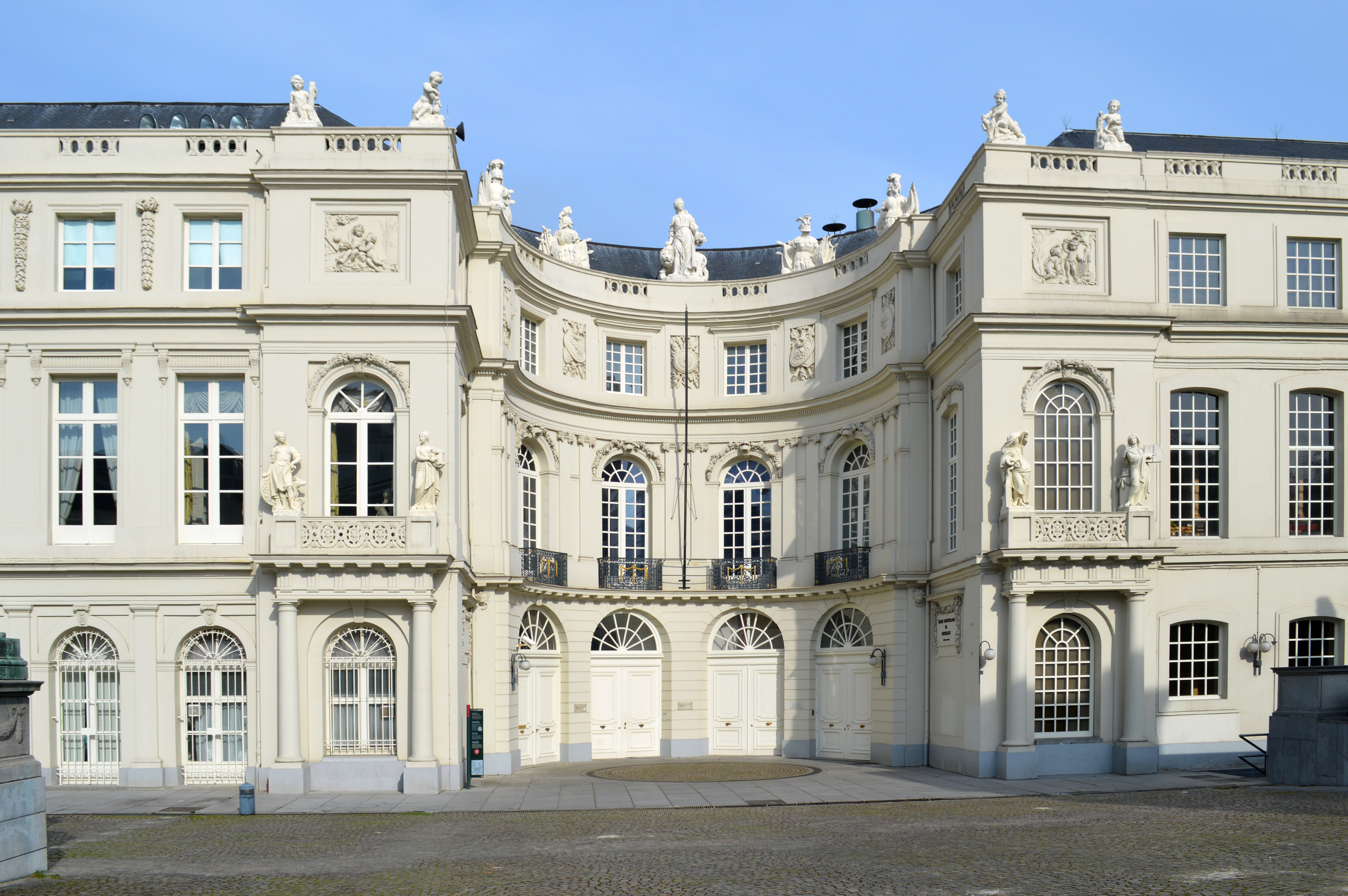
Entrance of the Palace of Charles of Lorraine

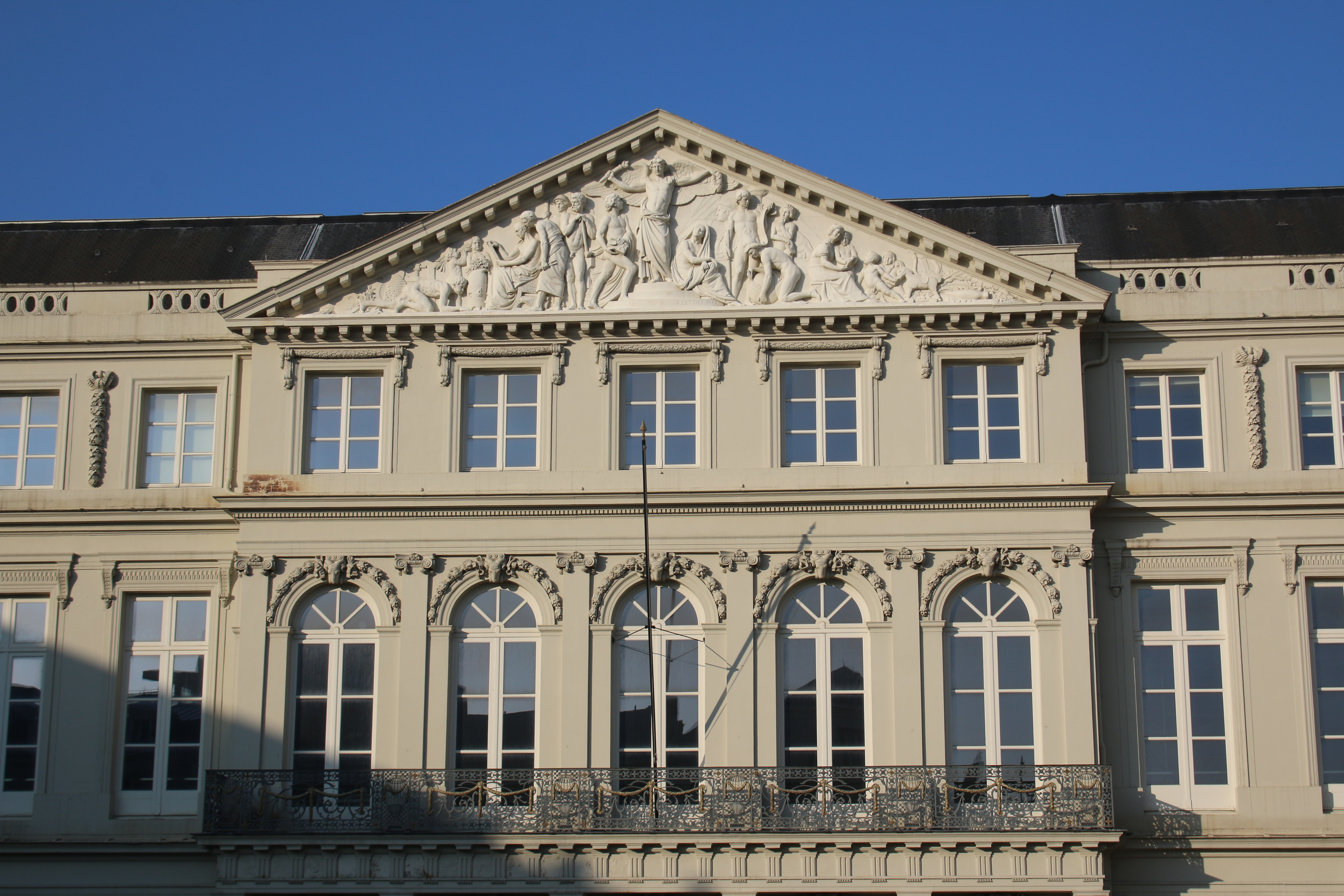
Closeup of one of the palace's pediments

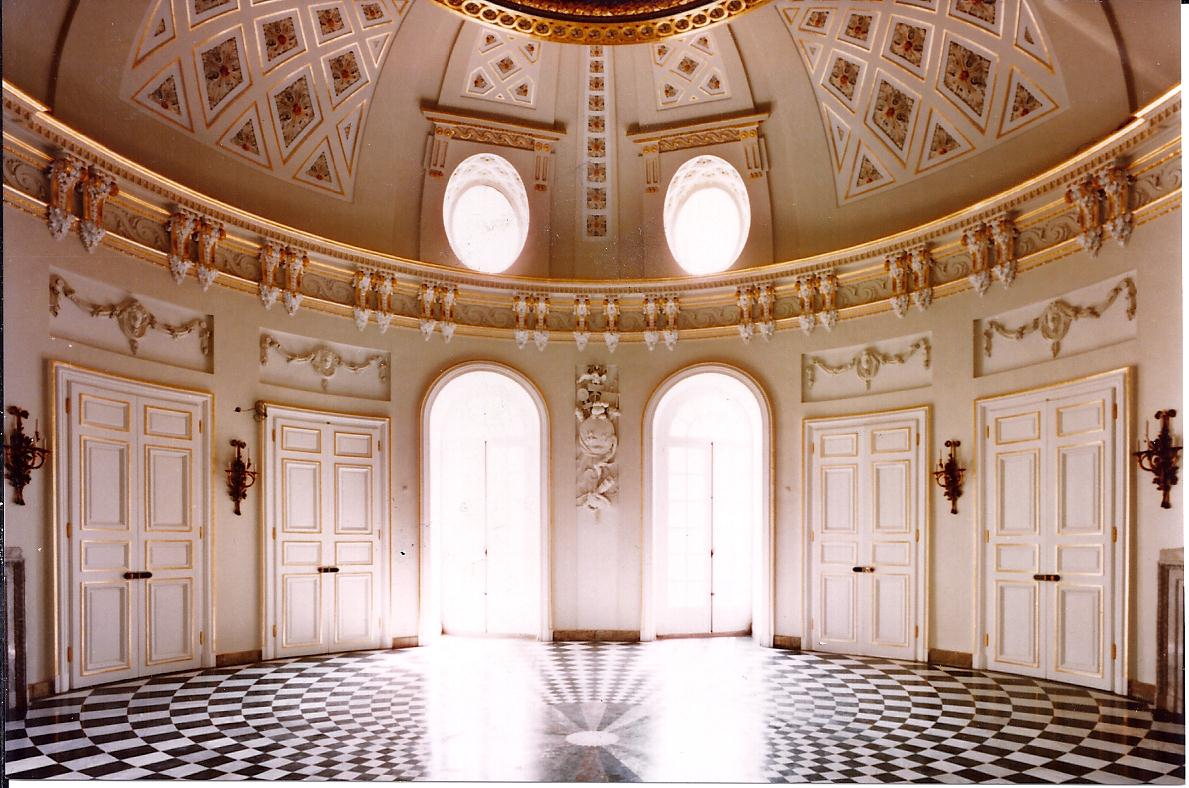
The rotunda with its marble flooring

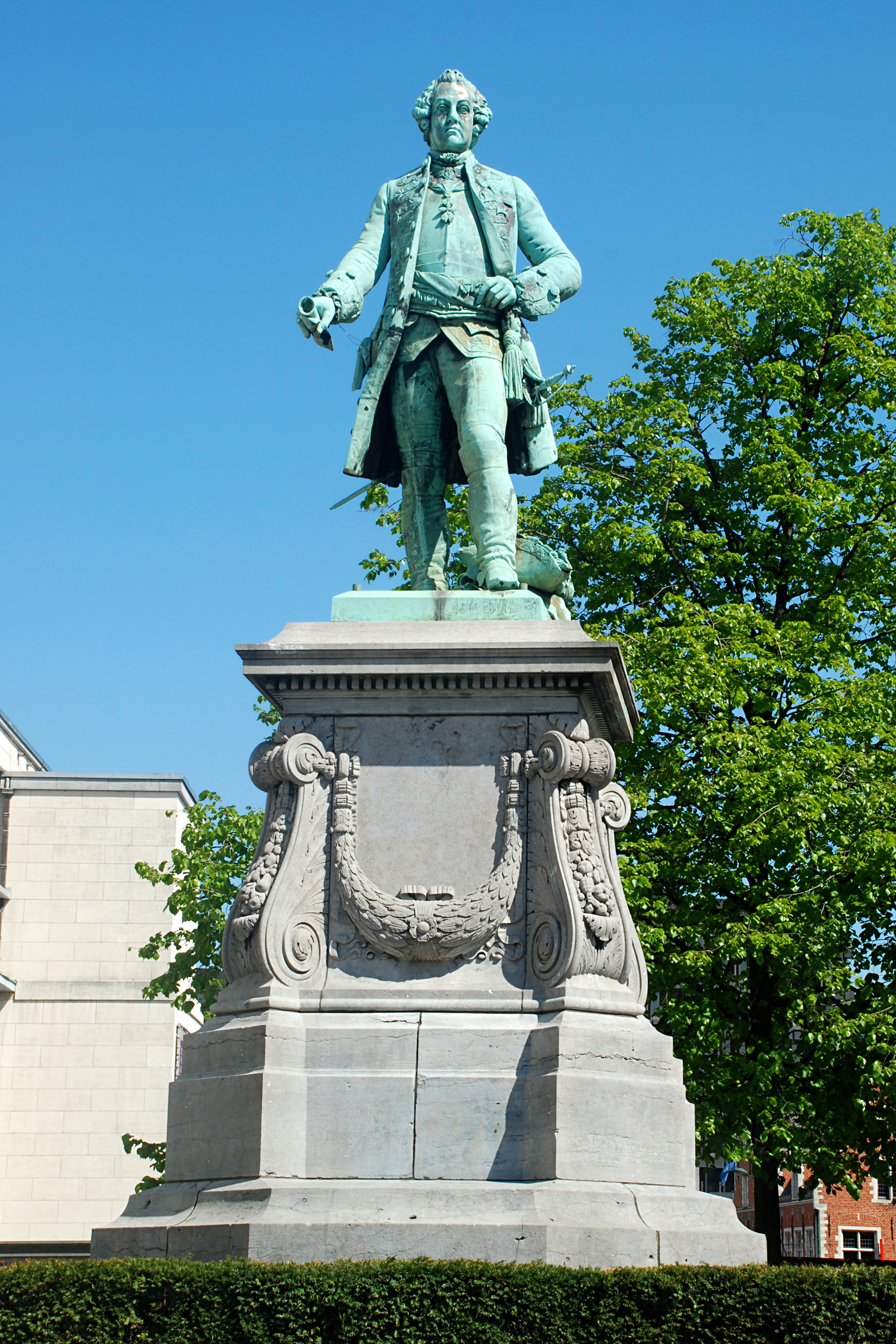
Statue of Prince Charles Alexander of Lorraine

== See also ==
- List of castles and châteaux in Belgium
- Neoclassical architecture in Belgium
- History of Brussels
- Culture of Belgium
- Belgium in the long nineteenth century
