= BELvue Museum =

History museum in Brussels, Belgium

- Musée BELvue (French); BELvue Museum (Dutch)
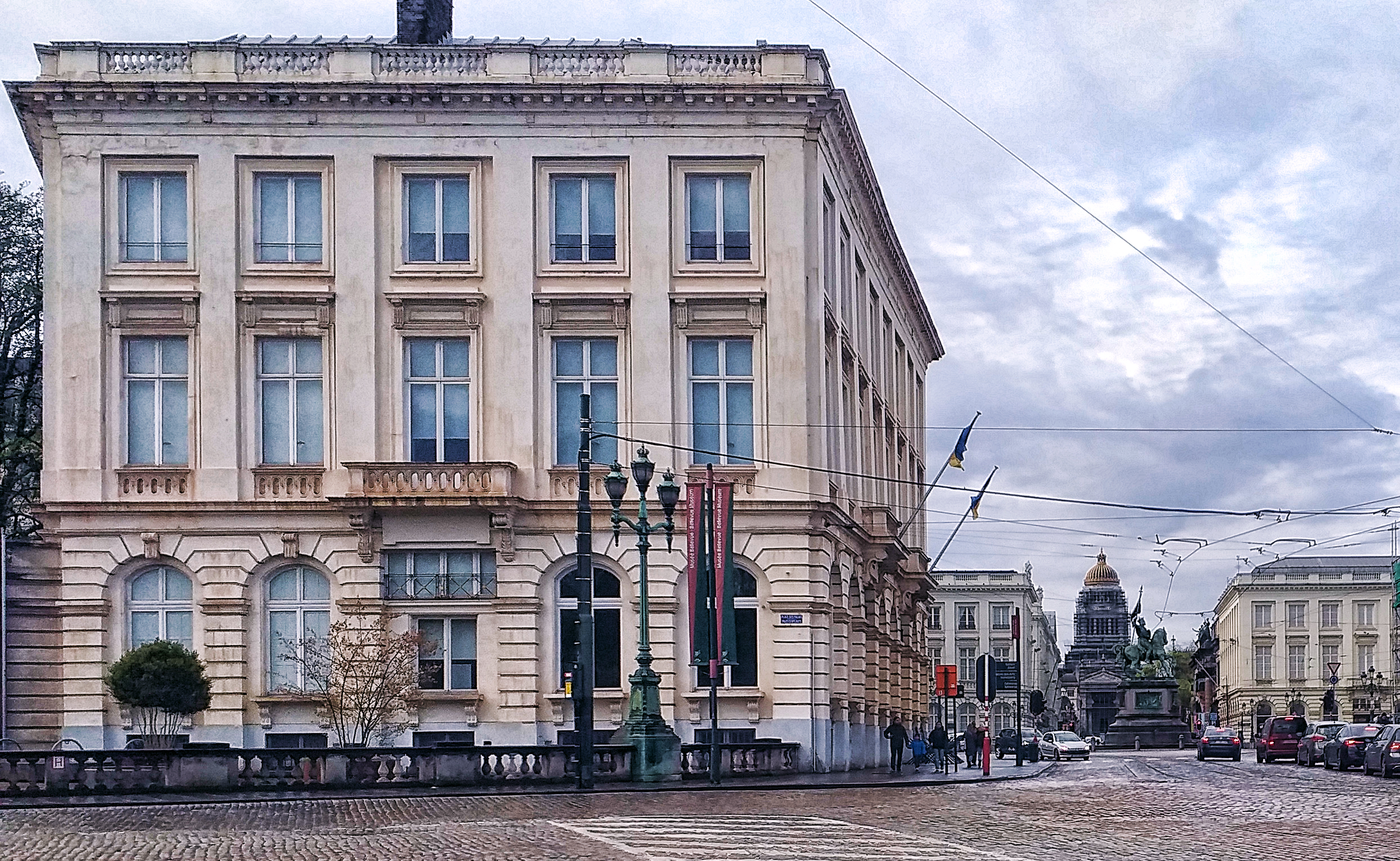
- Hôtel Belle-Vue, home of the BELvue Museum
- Interactive fullscreen map
- Established: 19 July 2005; 21 years ago
- Location: Place des Palais / Paleizenplein 7, 1000 City of Brussels, Brussels-Capital Region, Belgium
- Coordinates: 50°50′34″N 4°21′39″E
- Type: History museum
- Owner: Fonds BELvue
- Public transit access: Brussels-Central; 1 5 Parc/Park and 2 6 Trône/Troon
- Website: www.belvue.be/en

The BELvue Museum (French: Musée BELvue; Dutch: BELvue Museum) is a museum in the Royal Quarter of Brussels, Belgium, focusing on the history of Belgium. It is managed by the King Baudouin Foundation (KBF).

The museum is housed in the Hôtel Belle-Vue, an 18th-century neoclassical building between the Place des Palais/Paleizenplein and the Place Royale/Koningsplein, next to the Royal Palace of Brussels.

== History ==
The BELvue Museum is housed in the Hôtel Belle-Vue, a five-level hôtel particulier (townhouse) dating from the late 18th century. This neoclassical building formed part of an architectural complex built after the Palace of Coudenberg burned down in 1731. It was originally built by Philippe de Proft to install a luxury hotel for travellers.

The Place Royale/Koningsplein and its surrounding buildings were a site of fighting during the Belgian Revolution. It was there that the coronation ceremony of Prince Leopold of Saxe-Coburg, King of the Belgians, took place on 21 July 1831. The buildings then served as a residence for members of the Belgian royal family, including the future King Leopold III and Princess Astrid.

In 1977, the Hôtel Belle-Vue was converted into a museum building, housing a collection from the nearby Royal Museums of Art and History. After 1992, two small museums opened in the building relating to the history of the Belgian monarchy: the Dynasty Museum (French: Musée de la Dynastie, Dutch: Museum van de Dynastie) and the King Baudouin Memorial (French: Mémorial Roi Baudouin, Dutch: Memorial Koning Boudewijn).

On 19 July 2005, the Hôtel Belle-Vue reopened as a museum devoted to the history of Belgium, presenting a chronological display about the nation's history since 1830.

== Museum ==
Since its opening, the BELvue Museum, managed by the King Baudouin Foundation (KBF), has completely renewed its permanent exhibition. Employing a theme-based approach and with a modern, interactive exhibition layout, the museum offers visitors the keys to understanding Belgium and Belgian society.

Seven social themes are addressed in the rooms: democracy, prosperity, solidarity, pluralism, migration, language and Europe. Each theme is firstly presented from the perspective of the present day, then subsequently developed and explained through the history of Belgium.

This overview of Belgium's past and present is complemented by a gallery of more than 200 objects. Presented chronologically from the 19th century to today, the pieces embody Belgium's "physical memory". Visitors will find everyday objects, works of art and design, well-known brands, scientific discoveries, references to great sporting achievements, as well as objects that recall the richness of the country's popular culture.

== See also ==
- Magritte Museum
- List of museums in Brussels
- History of Brussels
- Culture of Belgium
- Belgium in the long nineteenth century
