= Palace of Coudenberg =

Former royal residence in Brussels, Belgium

Coordinates: 50.84263°N 4.36009°E

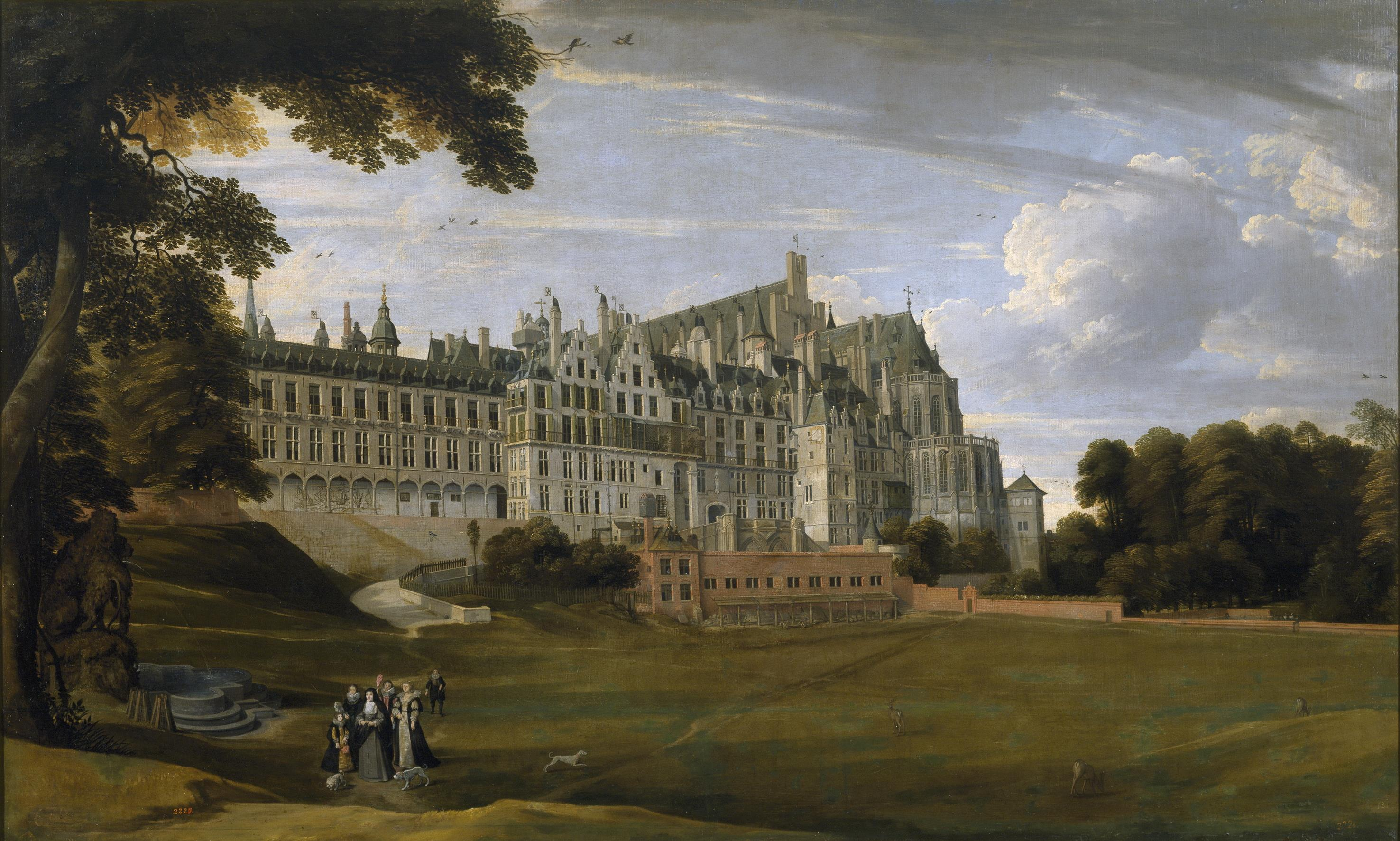
The Palace of Coudenberg, Jan Brueghel the Younger, c. 1627

The Palace of Coudenberg (French: Palais du Coudenberg; Dutch: Koudenbergpaleis) was a royal residence situated on the Coudenberg or Koudenberg (Dutch for "Cold Hill"), a hill in what is today the Royal Quarter of Brussels, Belgium. For nearly 700 years, the Castle and then Palace of Coudenberg was the residence (and seat of power) of the counts, dukes, archdukes, kings, emperors or governors who, from the 12th century to the 18th century, exerted their sovereignty over the Duchy of Brabant and later over all or part of the Burgundian and then Spanish and Austrian Netherlands.

The palace was completely destroyed in an accidental fire that broke out on the night of 3 February 1731 and the Place Royale/Koningsplein was built between 1775 and 1782 atop its ruins. Only the underground parts remain today. After several years of excavations, the archaeological vestiges of the palace and its foundations are open to the public via the BELvue Museum.

== History ==
=== Early history ===
The exact date when the first Castle of Coudenberg was built remains a subject of debate. It is generally fixed to the middle of the 11th century, when the counts of Leuven and Brussels left the bottom of the valley of the river Senne and built their castle on the heights of the Coudenberg, where there was a smaller risk of floods, and from where they could dominate Brussels. The choice of this site was also undoubtedly explained by its strategic position near urbanised areas, the road leading to Leuven where their main residence was located, as well as the Sonian Forest, an important reserve for game and raw materials. In 1047, the transfer by Lambert II, Count of Leuven of the relics of the martyr Saint Gudula from Saint Gaugericus' chapel to the church that would later become the Cathedral of St. Michael and St. Gudula, probably corresponded to the displacement of the seat of county power from the lower to the upper town. Still, the existence of the castle is well attested in the 12th century.

With the creation of the Duchy of Brabant in 1183 by the Holy Roman Emperor Frederick Barbarossa, the Coudenberg gained in importance and was included within the first great wall built around the city. The hunting park of the dukes led down the hill to the north, a remnant of which is now Brussels Park.

=== Rise in importance ===
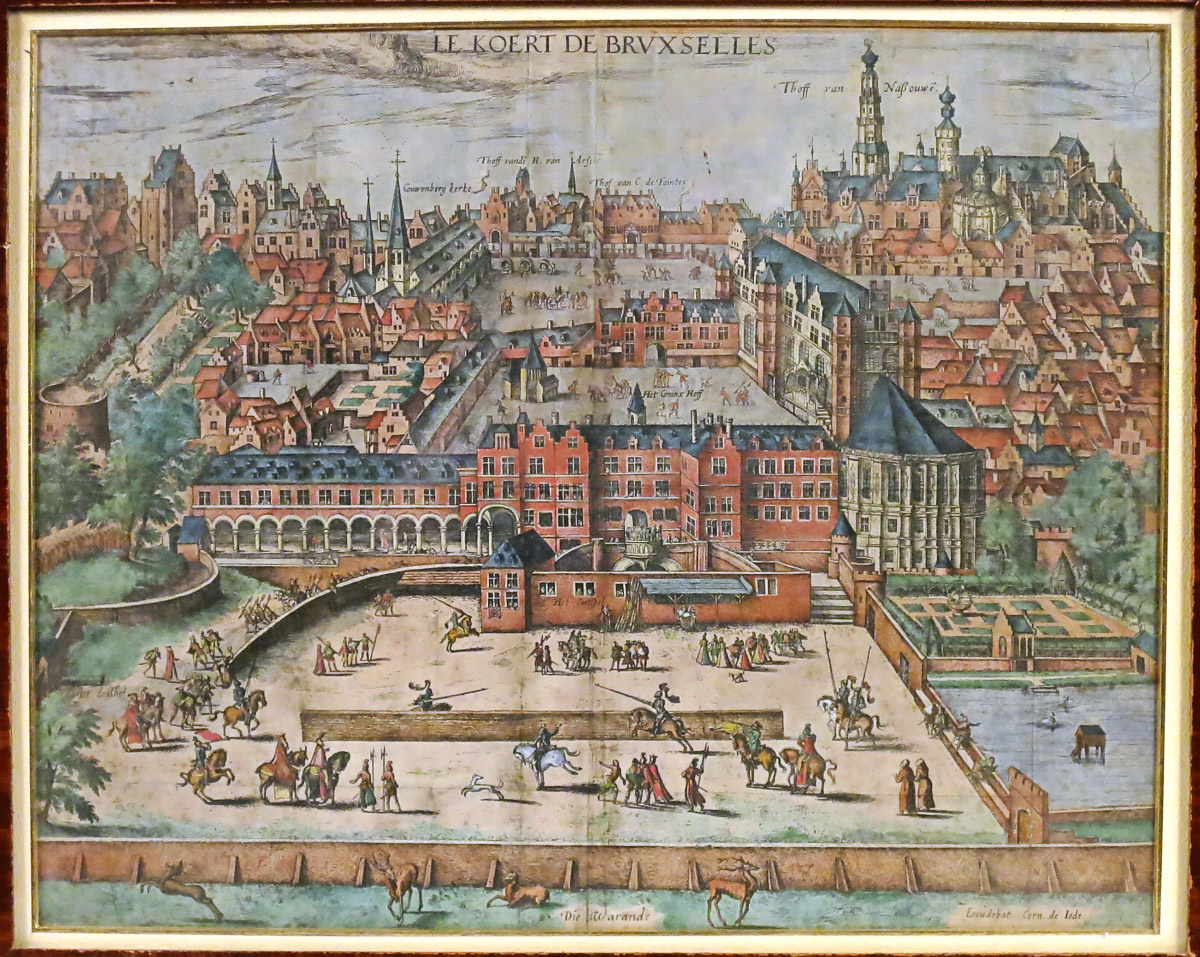
The Court of Brussels, Cornelis de Jode after Bartholomeus de Momper the Elder, late 16th century

When, at the start of the 13th century, the Duke of Brabant preferred Brussels to Leuven, the court relocated to the Castle of Coudenberg. With the construction of the city's second wall following the 1356 occupation by Louis II, Count of Flanders, the castle was no longer necessary as a primary defence, and it was gradually converted from a military stronghold into a residential palace. From that time on, links were woven between the ducal house and the city; the latter took charge of some embellishment works for the palace that had become by then the dukes' principal seat of government and a leisure home.

After 1430, when Brabant was annexed through inheritance by Burgundy, Philip the Good ordered the building of new wings for the palace, further embellishments to the park, and the building of the Aula Magna, a gigantic hall for royal receptions and other pageantry. The first regular meetings of the States General, composed of delegates from the middle class, clergy and nobility of the Burgundian Netherlands, were held there in 1465. It was in this room that, in 1515, Duchess Margaret of Austria formally relinquished her regency over the Habsburg Netherlands to Charles of Habsburg. It was also in this same room that, in 1555, Charles V abdicated in favour of his son, King Philip II of Spain. During his reign, Charles V ordered the creation of a large market square, known as the Place des Bailles/Baliënplein, in front of the palace. In the palace itself, he instructed the building of galleries and rooms in Renaissance style and the construction of the Grand Chapel in late Gothic style, in memory of his parents, Philip the Handsome and Joanna of Castile.

In the 17th century, under their reign as the sovereigns of the Spanish Netherlands, the Archdukes Albert VII and Isabella established their court on the Coudenberg. The archdukes restored the façade of the palace, transformed the buildings and refitted the apartments and gardens. For the protection of the Archduchess, as she made her way to her devotions in the cathedral (this being the height of the wars of religion), the street that skirts the Aula Magna and the chapel was extended almost as far as the Church of St. Michael and St. Gudula (now Brussels' cathedral), and renamed the Rue Isabelle/Isabellastraat ("Isabella Street"). As art lovers, the archdukes brought to their court the best artists of the time, Jan Brueghel the Elder and Peter Paul Rubens among them, to decorate the palace with their works.

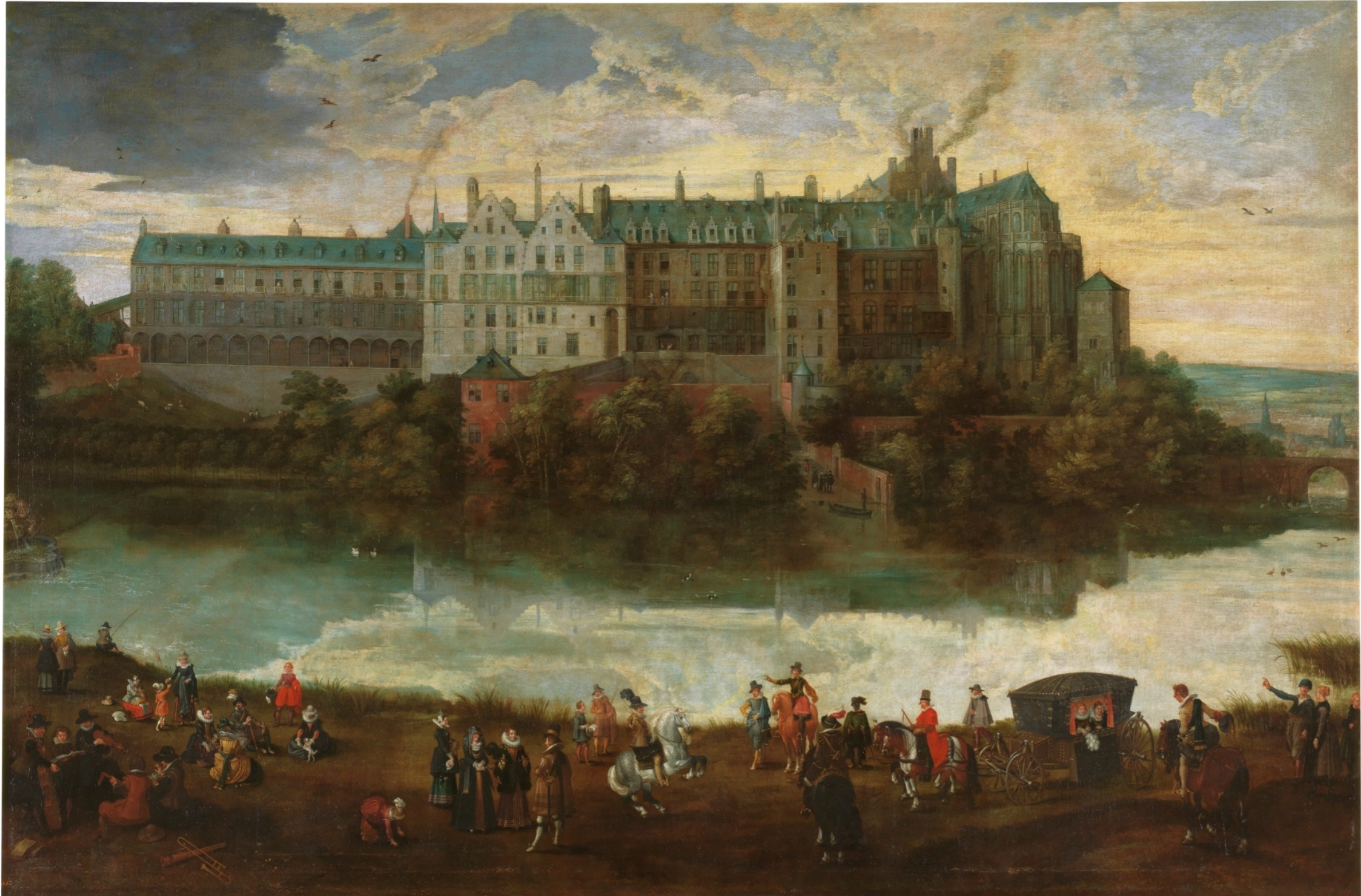
The Royal Palace in Brussels, Peter Brueghel the Younger and Sebastian Vrancx, c. 1627

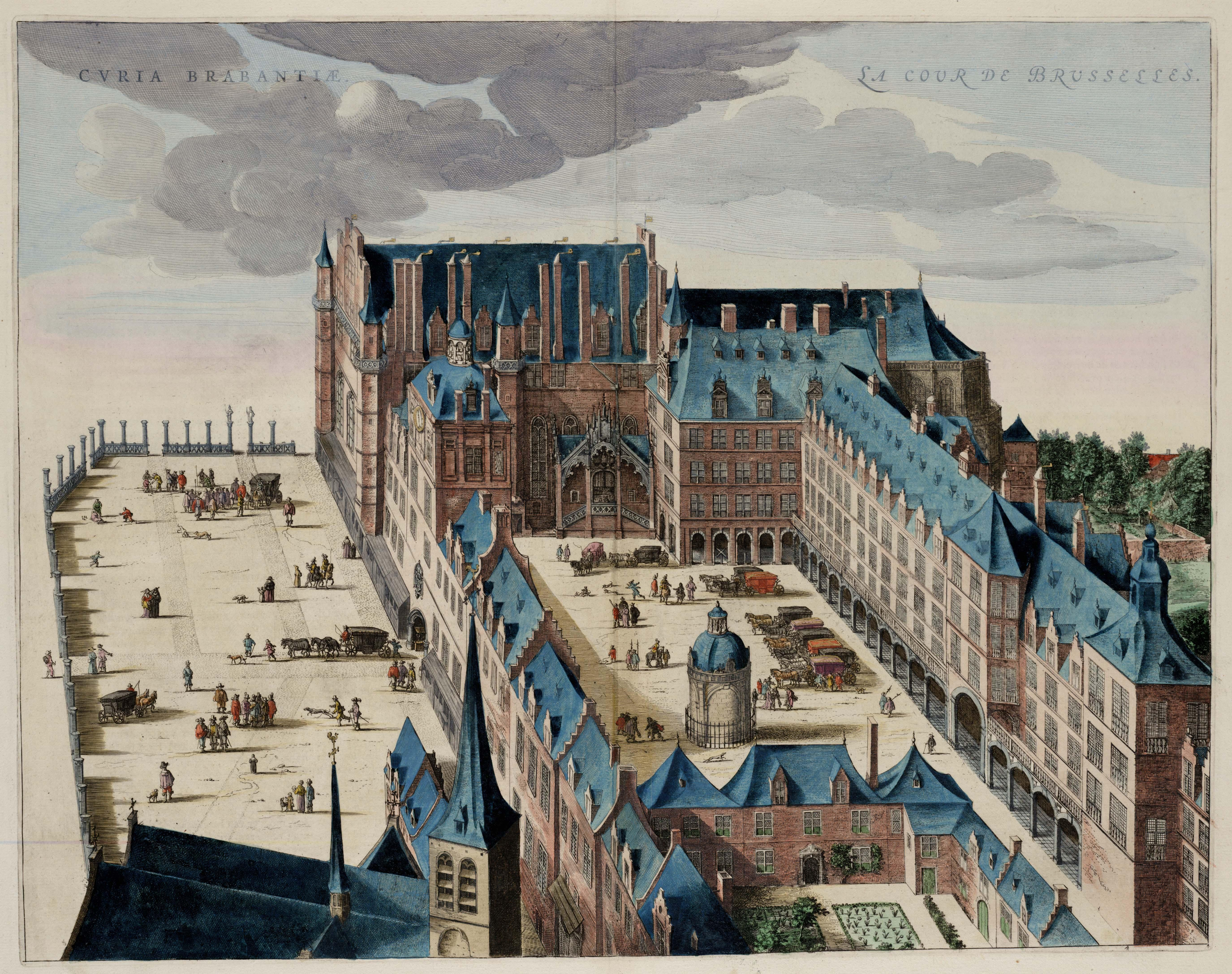
The Palace of Coudenberg depicted in the Atlas van Loon, 1649

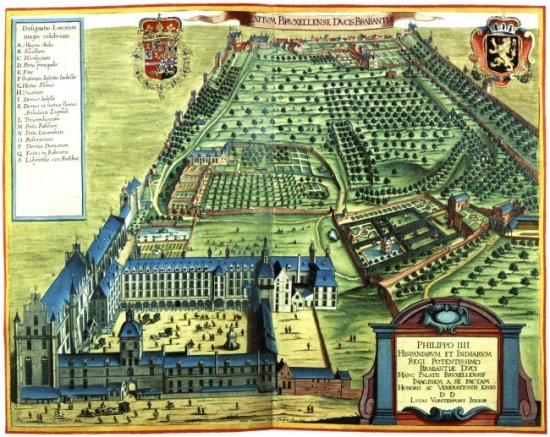
The palace and gardens of Coudenberg in 1659, L. Vorsterman the Younger

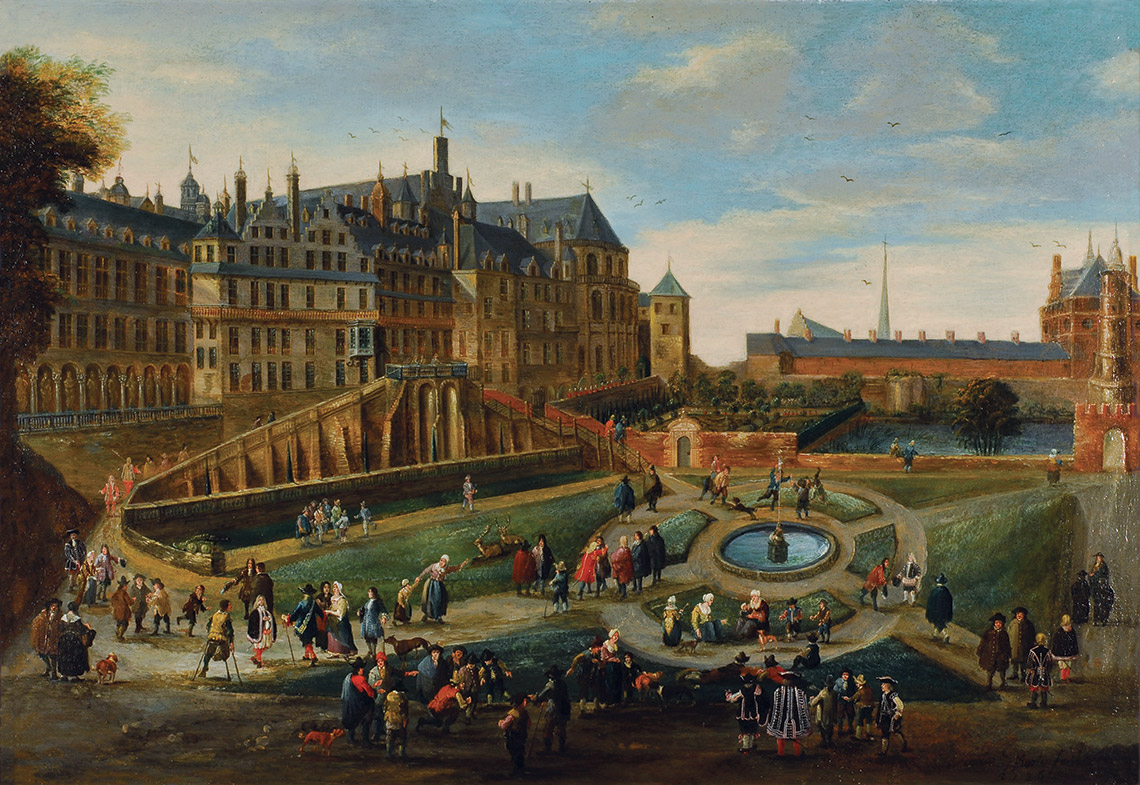
View of the Coudenberg Palace in Brussels, Andreas Martin, 1726

=== Fire and destruction ===
This impressive complex suffered several fires over the centuries. In 1679, a fire destroyed part of the roof. On the night of 3 February 1731, a fire broke out in the kitchens and quickly engulfed the entire palace. The freezing conditions made it difficult to deliver any water and the means of firefighting were very insufficient. In the morning, the palace was in ruins with many of the works of art destroyed along with the governmental archives. Only the court chapel and the walls of the Aula Magna were somewhat spared.

After the fire, the court moved to the Palace of Orange-Nassau, on the site of today's Palace of Charles of Lorraine, which from then on was known as the "New Court". Funds were not available for rebuilding, so for more than forty years, the old palace remained in a state of ruin, known as the Cour brûlée ("Burnt Court"). Several projects for the redevelopment of this space were proposed, including the reconstruction of a palace, which did not go beyond the stage of sketches, for lack of money. In 1769, the idea germinated to clear and level the ruins of the Place des Bailles and to convert it into an esplanade intended for military parades. The plan was on the verge of completion in 1772, when another project rendered it obsolete.

It was only in 1774 that Prince Charles Alexander of Lorraine, Governor of the Austrian Netherlands, proposed replacing the ruins with a monumental royal square inspired by French models such as the Place Stanislas in Nancy (1755) and the Place Royale in Reims (1759), of which it is almost an exact replica. The project was approved that same year by Empress Maria Theresa, who authorised the demolition. The first draft of the project, designed by the engineers-architects Louis-Joseph Baudour and Claude Fisco had planned to keep the Gothic chapel of the former palace, which had been spared by the fire. Due to the architectural clash with the surrounding neoclassical buildings, however, it was pulled down.

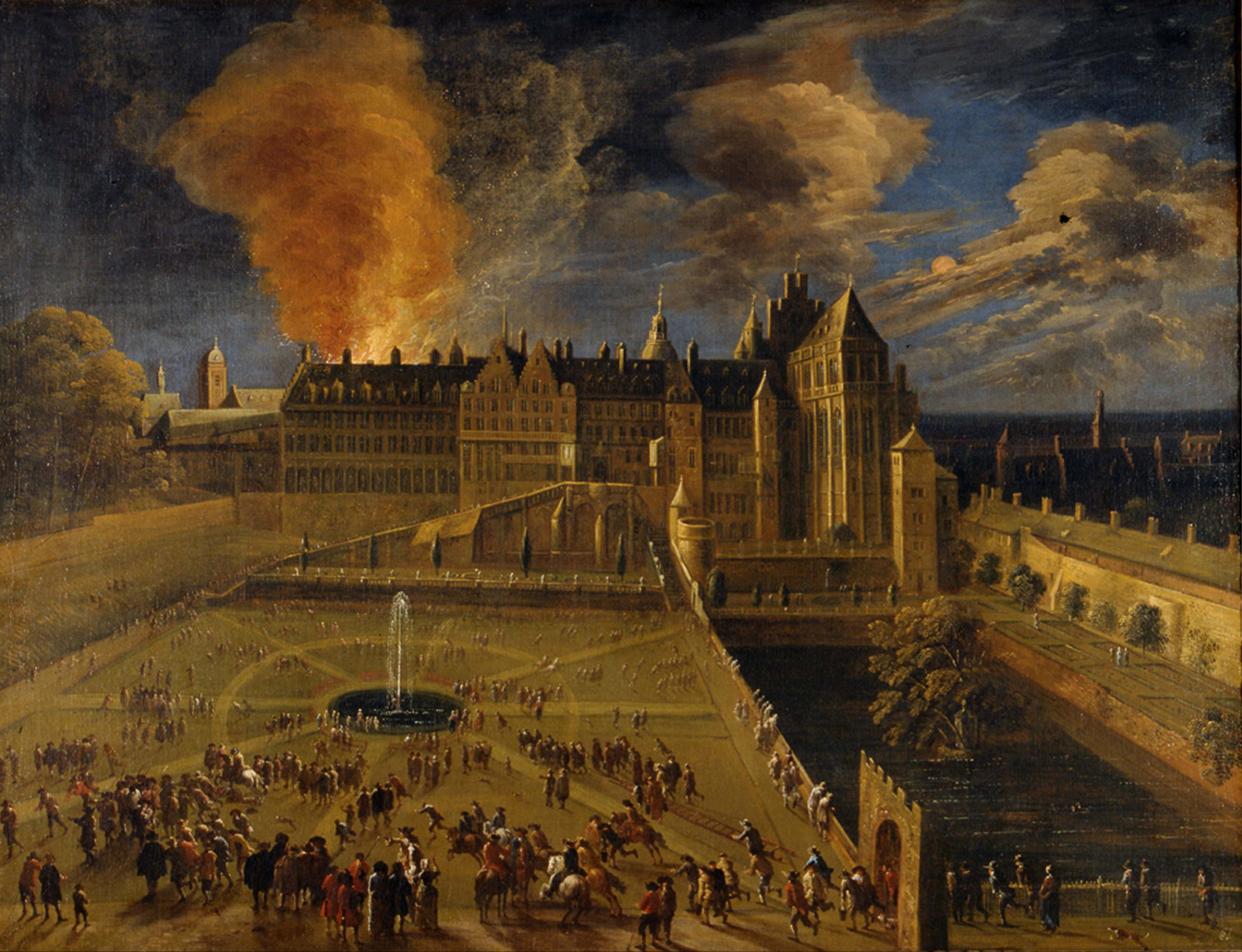
The Fire of 1679 in the Coudenberg Palace by Gillis van Auwerkercken

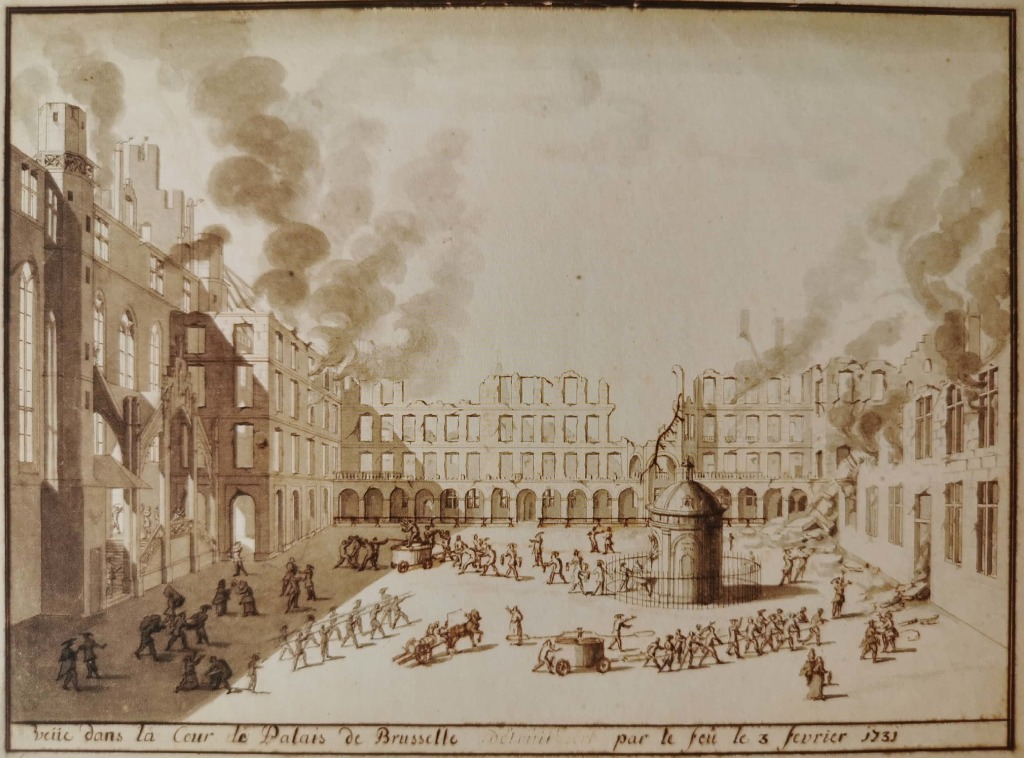
View of the palace's courtyard after the fire on 3 February 1731

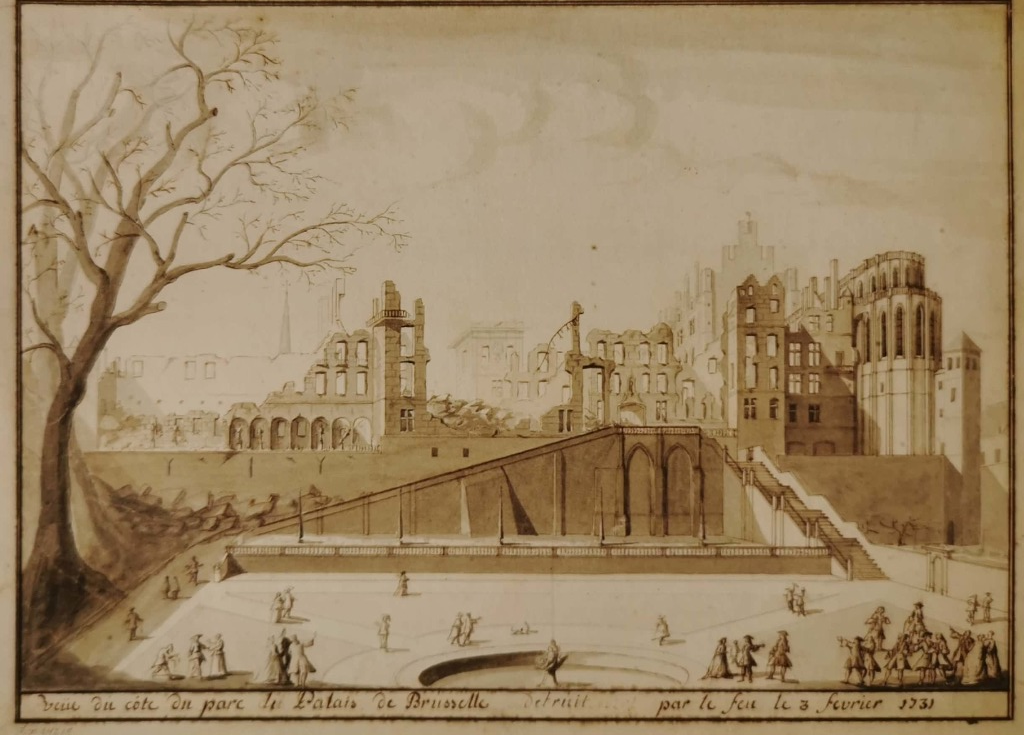
View of the ruins from the park

== Present day ==
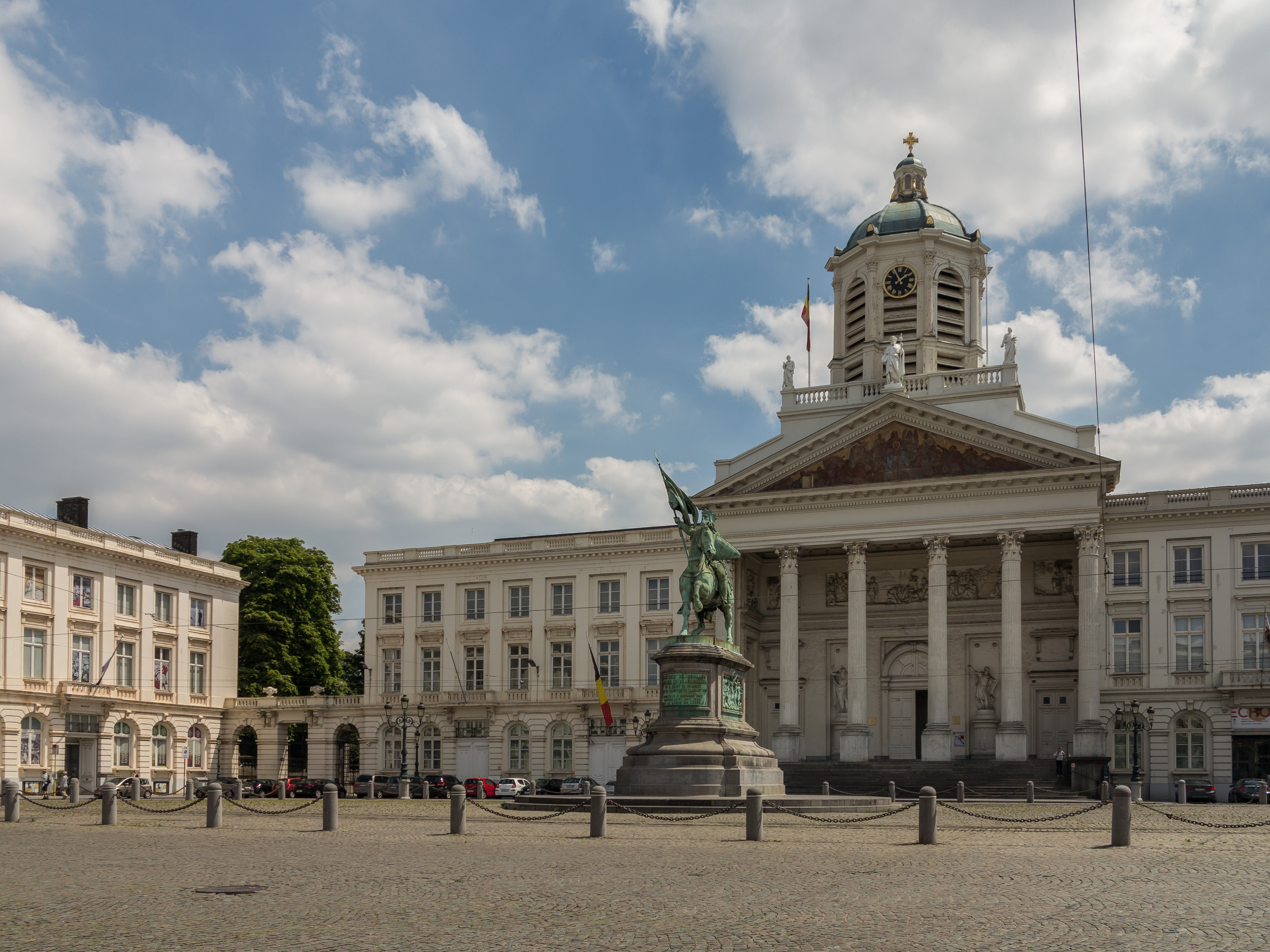
The Place Royale/Koningsplein was built atop the ruins of the old palace.

Nowadays, on the Coudenberg, just off the south-western corner of Brussels Park, lies the Place Royale/Koningsplein, the neoclassical square built between 1775 and 1782 atop the ruins of the old palace. At the centre of the square stands an equestrian statue of Godfrey of Bouillon, the leader of the First Crusade in 1096. The square is also faced by the neoclassical Church of St. James on Coudenberg, which was designed by the architects Gilles-Barnabé Guimard and Louis Montoyer and built from 1776 to 1787. In the 19th century, a dome and bell tower, as well as a coloured fresco, were added to the church.

The square is surrounded by many museums and cultural institutions, including the BELvue Museum, the Royal Museums of Fine Arts of Belgium, the Musical Instruments Museum (MIM) (which is housed in the former Old England department store), and the Magritte Museum. There are a number of other notable buildings on the Coudenberg including the Court of Audit of Belgium; the Royal Chapel, built in 1760–61 with a Louis XVI-style interior; and the Palace of Charles of Lorraine. Other major tourist attractions are located within walking distance: Brussels Park, the Royal Palace, and the Cathedral of St. Michael and St. Gudula.

== Archaeological remains and partial restoration ==
The remains of the ancient palace and adjacent building have been extensively excavated below present ground level, and preserved with a partial concrete cover. The remains can be visited via the BELvue Museum, and provide an excellent presentation of this historical site. The main buildings of the palace stood on roughly the same location as the present-day museum and the Rue Royale/Koningstraat, which faces it. The adjacent chapel and Aula Magna buildings stood on sites that are now respectively part of the Centre for Fine Arts (BOZAR/PSK centre) and the north corner of the Place Royale/Koningsplein beside the Musical Instruments Museum (MIM). The former Rue Isabelle/Isabellastraat ran beside these buildings; it had a significant slope, but the present surface of the Rue Royale, which parallels it, is flat, as the whole area was levelled in the 18th century. The lower rooms of these buildings partially survived the fire, and are exposed in the archaeological site.

The preserved remains presently visitable comprise the cellars of the main palace, the rooms underlying the main banqueting hall in the Aula Magna, as well as the warehouse space that underlay the chapel. On the other side of the Rue Isabelle, all along its length lay the house of the influential Counts of Hoogstraeten, currently at an advanced stage of excavation, with a view to later opening to visitors, alongside the existing remains.

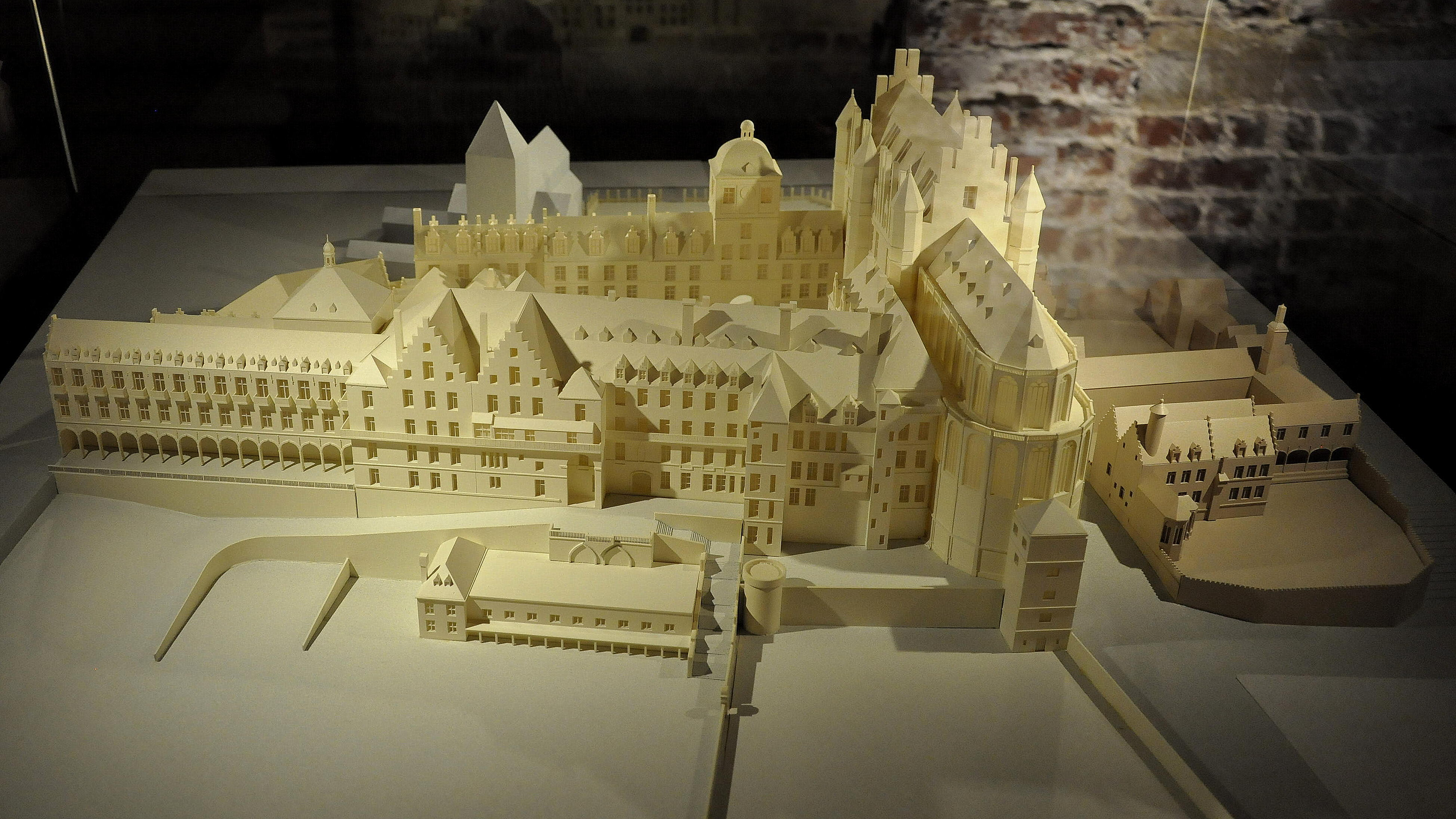
Model of the palace

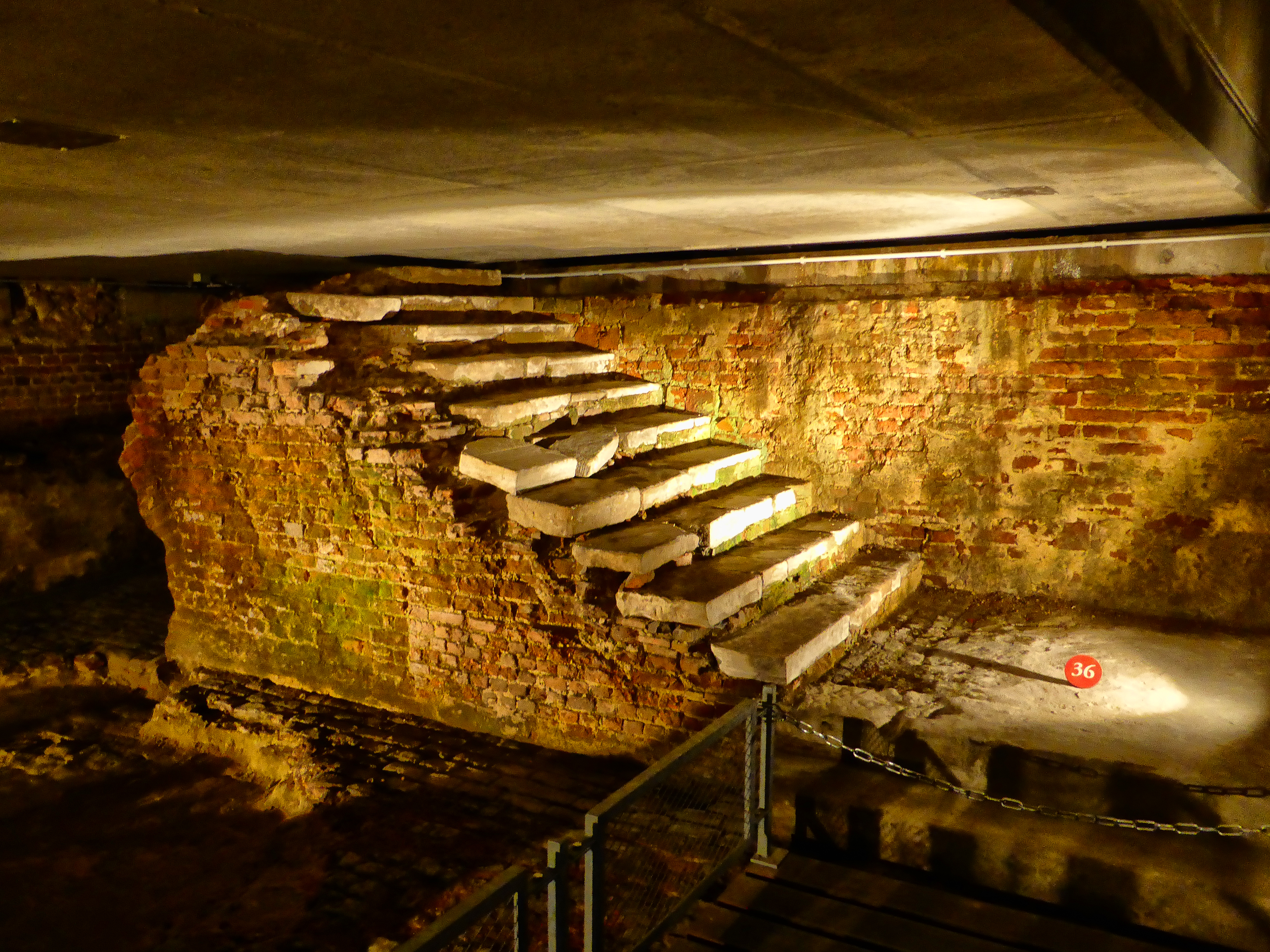
Stairs

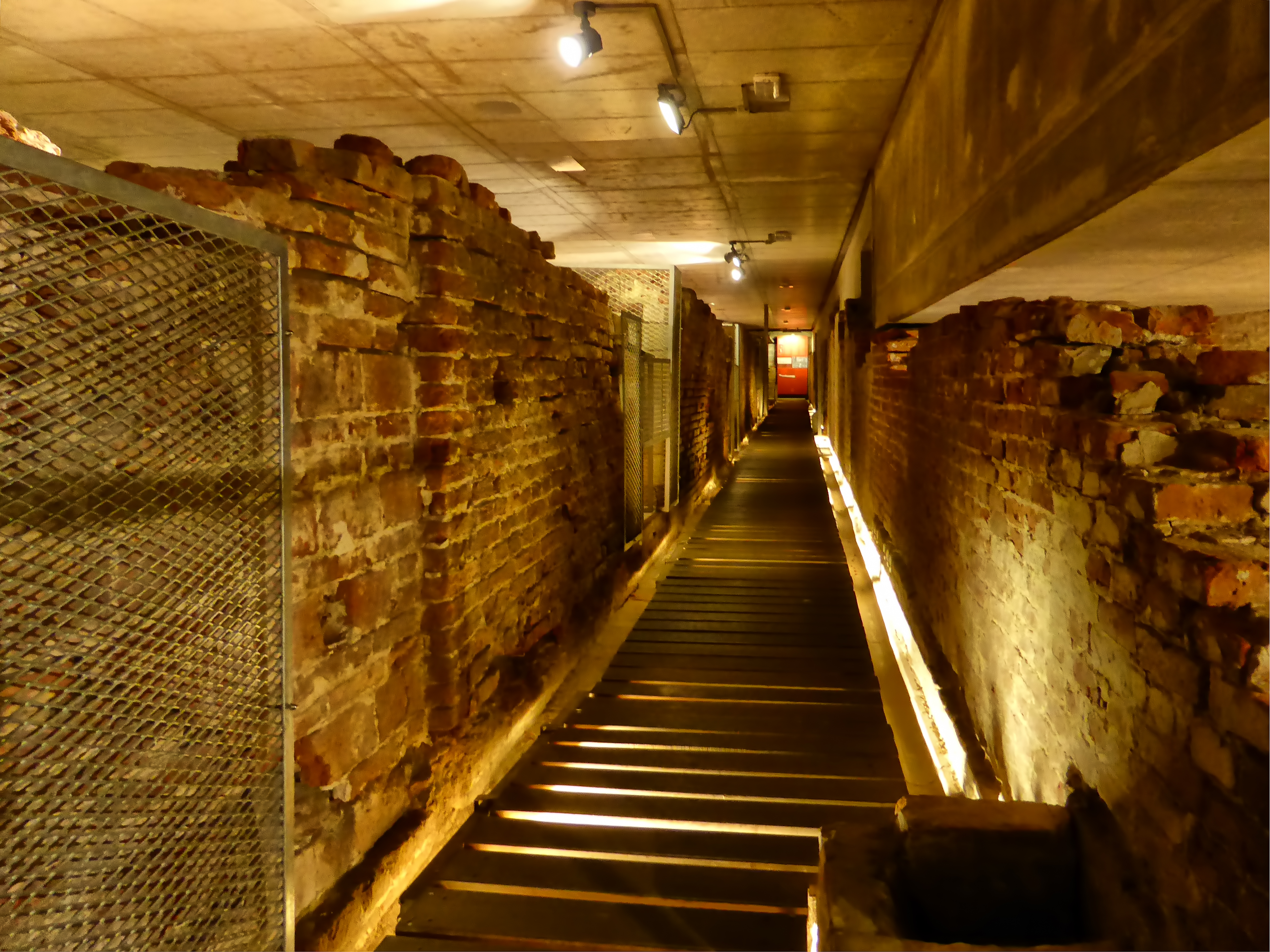
Passage

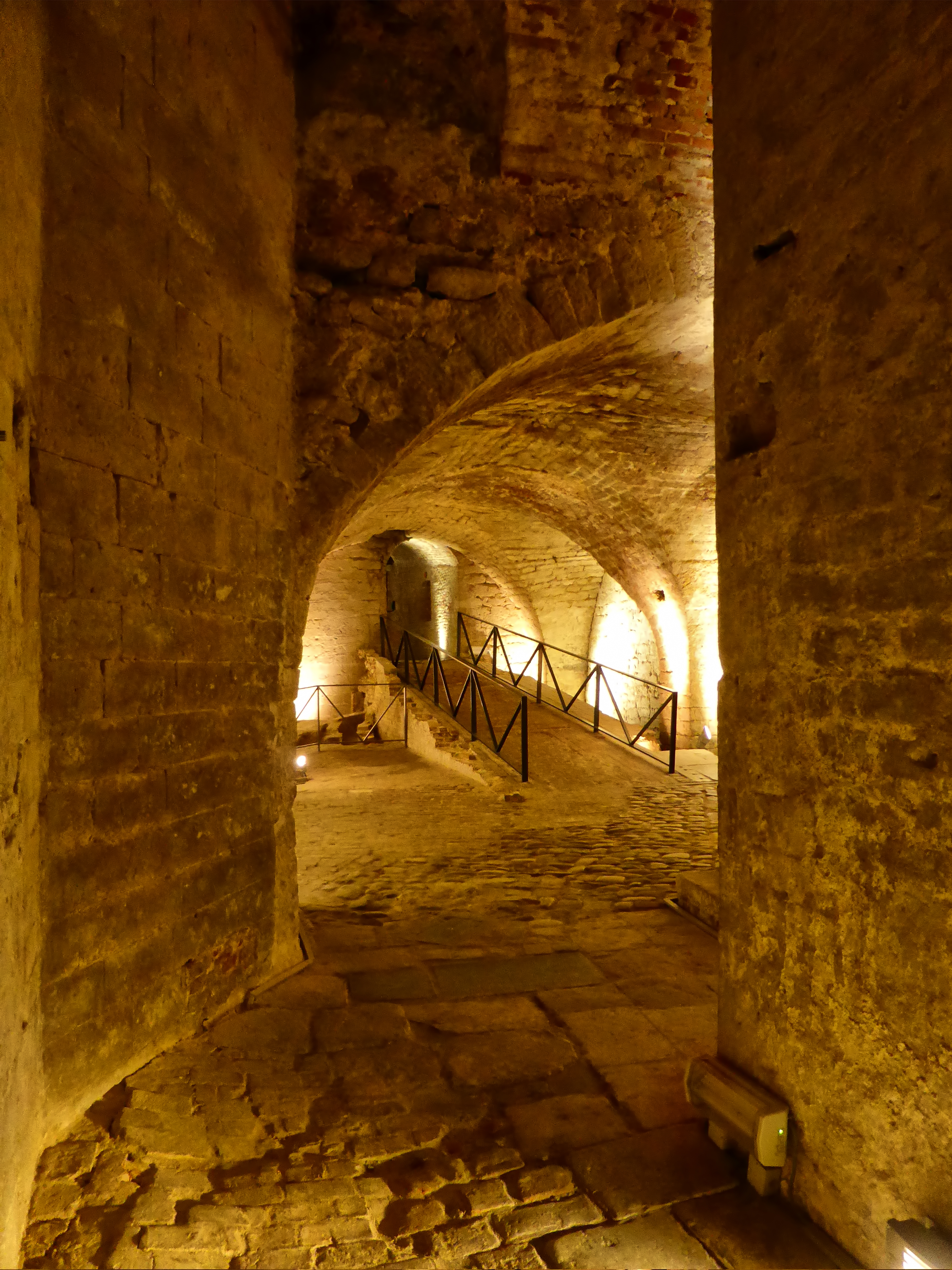
Foundations

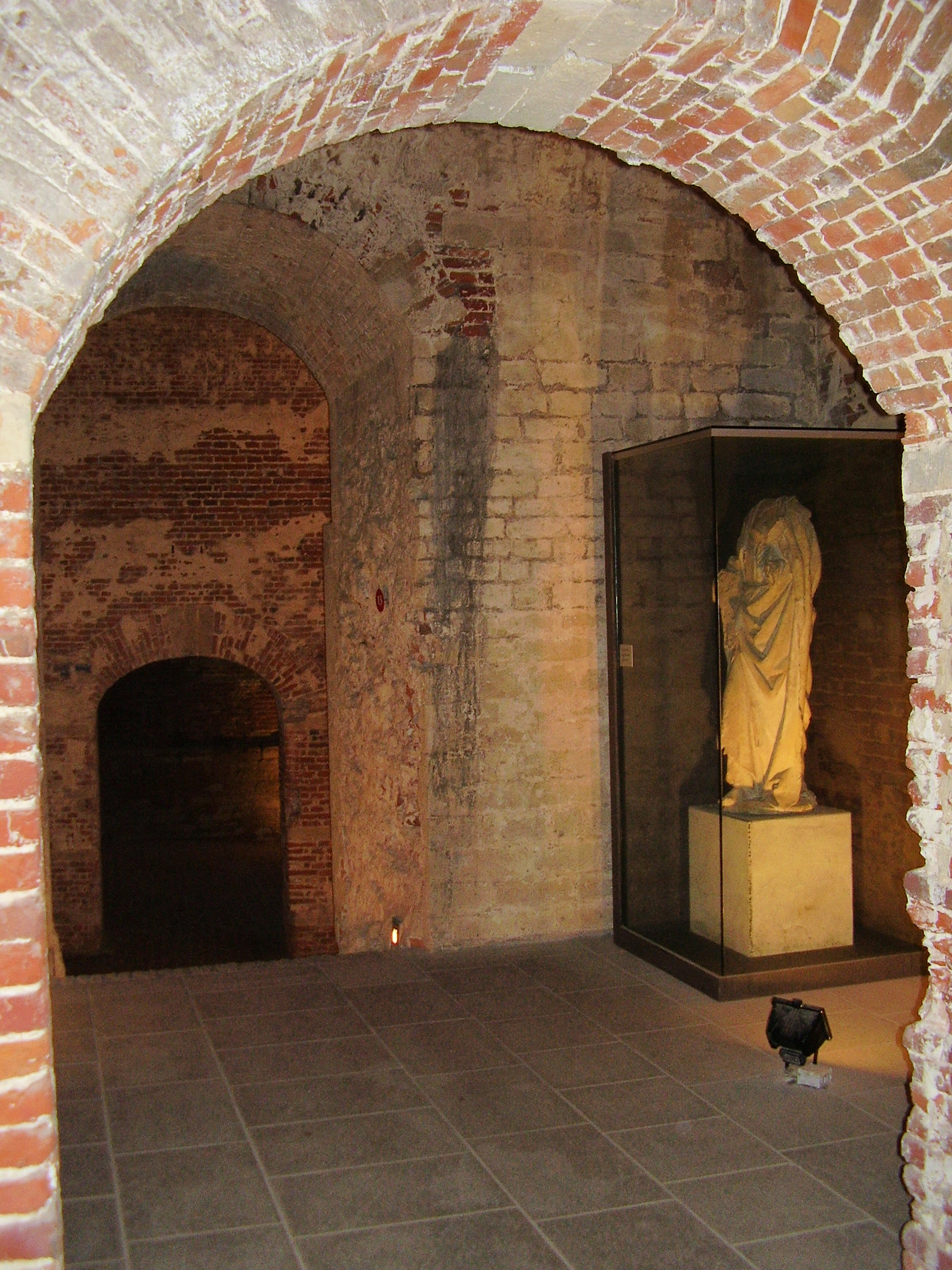
Statue of an apostle, 15th century

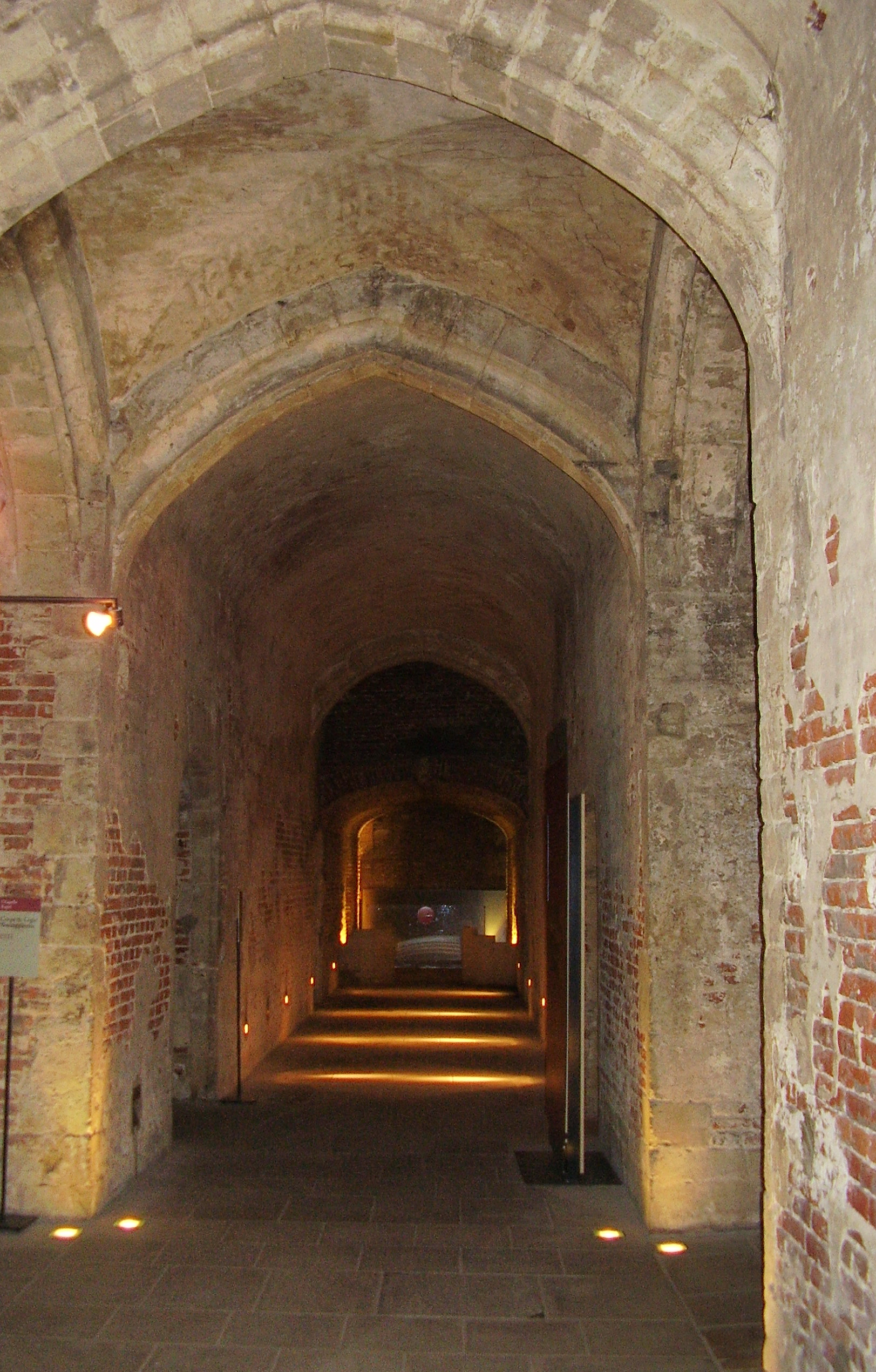
Under the chapel

== See also ==
- List of castles and châteaux in Belgium
- History of Brussels
- Culture of Belgium
