= Sophie Lothaire =

French dancer, actress and director

Marguerite-Louise Odiot de Montroty, stage name Sophie Lothaire (born 1732 in Paris) was a French dancer, actress and director who spent her whole career at the Théâtre de la Monnaie in Brussels.

== Life ==
She began as a figurative dancer, from 1753 to 1772, under the name of Mlle Sophie, before becoming an actress until 1775. In 1762, Chevrier wrote that "she plays all sorts of roles indifferent well - she shares, by economy, the reading of sieur Duranci".

In 1766, the comic-actors clubbed together to head the Théâtre de Bruxelles. This association was made up of D'Hannetaire and his two daughters Eugénie and Angélique, Mlle Rosalide, Compain, Prévost, Le Petit, Dubois, Durancy, D'Rozely, Serville, Grégoire, Mme Granier, Suzette Defoye and Sophie Lothaire.

From 1777 to 1783, Sophie Lothaire shared the direction of the theatre with Louis-Jean Pin and Alexandre Bultos. When this arrangement hit financial difficulties, she returned to France, to Versailles, where she tried to recoup the sums still owed to her.

Preceded by Ignaz Vitzthumb	director of the Théâtre de la Monnaie; 1777-1783	Succeeded by Alexandre and Herman Bultos
