= Vauxhall, Brussels =

Historic performance hall in Brussels, Belgium

Vauxhall
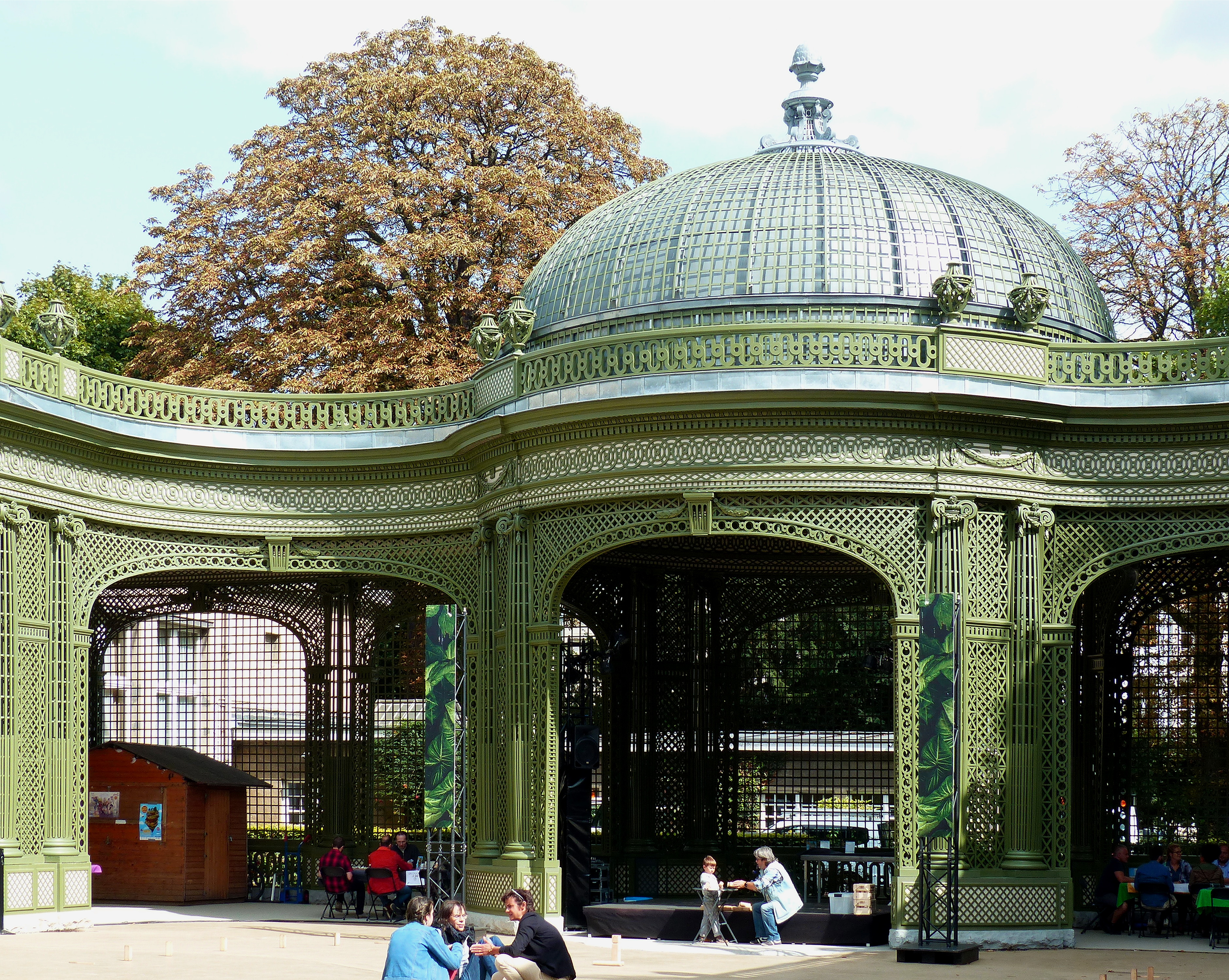
- The Vauxhall of Brussels
- Interactive map of Vauxhall
- Address: Rue de la Loi / Wetstraat 3–5; 1000 City of Brussels, Brussels-Capital Region; Belgium
- Coordinates: 50°50′43″N 4°21′53″E
- Owner: City of Brussels
- Type: Concert hall
- Public transit: Brussels-Central; 1 5 Parc/Park and 1 2 5 6 Arts-Loi/Kunst-Wet

Construction
- Opened: 1781
- Rebuilt: 1913
- Architect: François Malfait

The Vauxhall, also known as the Vaux-Hall or Waux-Hall, is a historic performance hall and entertainment complex in central Brussels, Belgium. Established in the 1780s by the Bultos family, and named after Vauxhall Gardens in London, it was originally conceived as a pleasure venue combining a theatre, café-restaurant, dance hall and retail pavilions. Since 1818, it has been the property of the City of Brussels.

The complex underwent numerous transformations and periods of decline. Its current appearance, including the distinctive U-shaped gallery and orchestra pavilion, with its green trelliswork and dome, largely dates from a 1913 redevelopment by the architect François Malfait. The site is now a protected heritage monument, occasionally hosting cultural events.

The Vauxhall is located at 3–5, rue de la Loi/Wetstraat, on the edge Brussels Park, behind the Royal Park Theatre.

== Toponymy ==
The Vauxhall is named after the pleasure gardens of Vauxhall in London. This entertainment venue had been established as early as the 17th century in the countryside around Kennington, on the very old estate of a certain Falkes de Breauté. The place was initially known as Falkes' Hall, then the name gradually evolved into Fox Hall, and finally Vaux Hall. Over time, a Vauxhall came to denote an entertainment venue set up in a public park, a trend that spread throughout Europe during the 18th century. The name only became known to the inhabitants of Brussels in 1761, when a ballet entitled Le Phaxal was put on at the Theatre of La Monnaie.

== History ==
=== Early history ===
The history of Brussels' Vauxhall is closely linked to that of the Royal Park Theatre. It was established in 1781 by the brothers Alexandre and Herman Bultos, co-directors of La Monnaie and of the Park Theatre. Built in the north-eastern section of Brussels Park and attributed to the architect Louis Montoyer, the complex originally consisted of the rotunda-shaped Park Theatre, a rectangular café-restaurant-dance hall connected by a gallery, as well as several pavilions intended for luxury retail. In operation from 1784, this centre of Brussels' high society hosted, among others, the Austrian governors and their princely guests, the First Consul Napoleon and his wife Joséphine in 1803, and later, many prominent French exiles of the Bourbon Restoration.

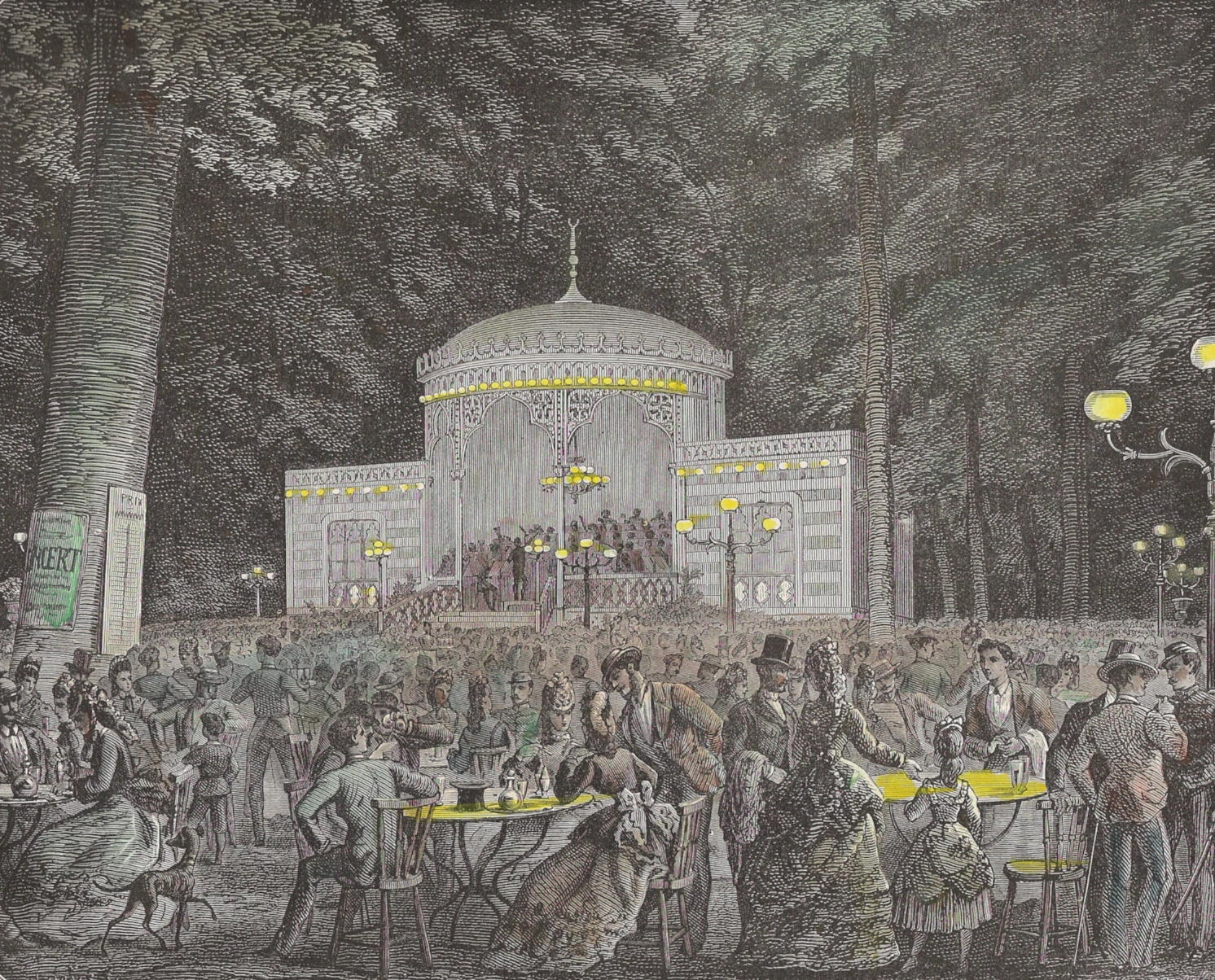
The Vauxhall in 1872, etching from L'Illustration Européenne

Following the bankruptcy of the Bultos brothers, the Vauxhall was taken over in 1818 by the City of Brussels, which divided the complex into multiple leases. The retail pavilions disappeared, while the theatre and café were enlarged, renovated and repurposed. The name Vauxhall then came to refer only to the space left free of buildings within the original enclosure, where the Grande Harmonie—and later the Société des Concerts du Waux Hall, from 1853 onwards—organised public concerts. The large building behind the theatre has been used, since 1871, by the Cercle Gaulois arts and literature club, and its predecessors, as a venue for meetings, dinners, exhibitions and concerts. The bandstand erected to house the orchestra was rebuilt in 1892 in the neo-Moorish style.

=== 20th and 21st centuries ===
The City of Brussels, which was seeking to relaunch the breathless entertainment venue, decided to completely redevelop the Vauxhall site in 1913. A U-shaped gallery and an orchestra pavilion topped with a dome à l'impériale were erected on that occasion to designs by the architect François Malfait. To fulfill the city's wish, Malfait borrowed from garden architecture—particularly that of Versailles (1751)—the trellis technique, which he used to decorate the pavilion in a Louis XVI style tinged with eclecticism and to construct the gallery that skilfully connects it to the Cercle Gaulois building, while camouflaging its south and west façades. Seized by the occupying German forces during World War I, the Vauxhall reopened to the public in 1921, but soon fell into disuse. A final concert was held there in 1933.

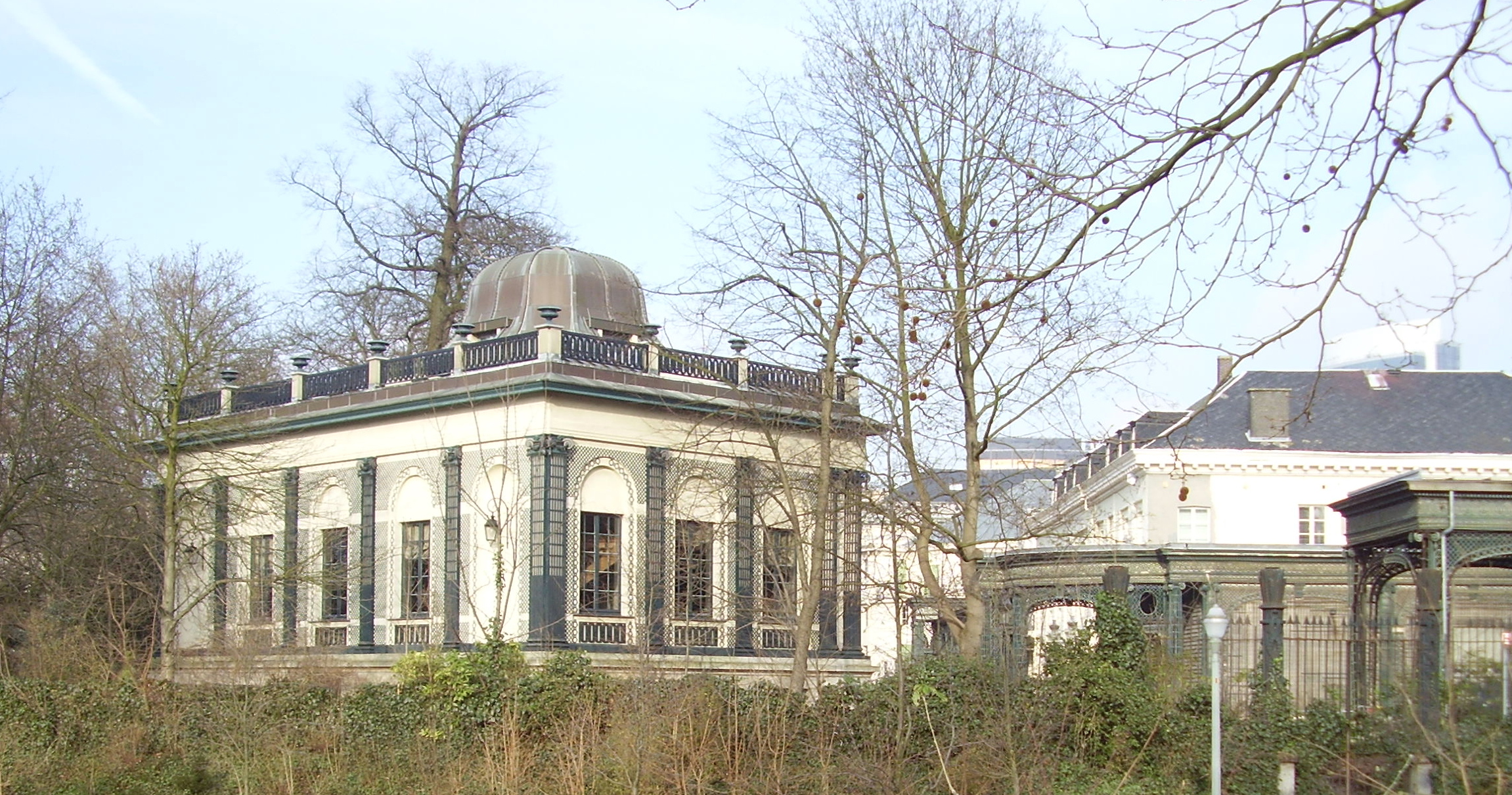
The Vauxhall in 2007

In 1987, the City of Brussels leased the small, dilapidated building to a private individual, Baron Éric d'Huart, who undertook extensive renovations to make it his home and simultaneously a venue for cultural events, a kind of Gesamtkunstwerk ("total work of art"). The building was classified as a protected monument on 19 May 1994. In 2011, d'Huart left the premises due to the noise caused by the increasing number of festivities in the park. After leasing the site to a new tenant who subsequently went bankrupt, the city carried out renewed work from 2012 to 2016, then sought an operator through a public tender in 2017. Since then, the venue has once again been used for cultural activities, particularly through the Vaux Hall Summer annual event, which features concerts, film screenings, dance, workshops, etc.
