= Isabella Borremans =

Isabella Borremans (fl. 1778) was a Flemish opera singer and stage actor.

She was the leading female actor of the Flemish language theatre, Opéra flamand, created by director Ignaz Vitzthumb at the La Monnaie in Brussels in 1772–1776. This was the first professional Flemish language theatre and opera in Brussels, and she was its star actress. She mainly played heroine roles as 'premiere amoureuse en chef aux Flamands', and the first Flemish woman in this position in Brussels, where actresses were otherwise French.
