= Mimi Vitzthumb =

Flemish opera singer and stage actress

Anne-Marie "Mimi" Vitzthumb (died after 1777) was an opera singer and stage actress. She was engaged at the La Monnaie in Brussels in the Austrian Netherlands in 1772–1777, where she belonged to the elite of the stage attractions of her time.

She was the daughter of theater director Ignaz Vitzthumb, sister of the opera singer Marie-Francoise Vitzthumb, married to the opera singer Henri Mees (1757-1820) and mother of the composer Joseph-Henri Mees.

Being bilingual, she played a number of main roles in both the French language Opéra francaise and the Flemish language Opéra flamand at the Monnaie stage. The Flemish opera stage was an innovation introduced by her father, became successful and attracted great criticism from the French language opera stage, and Mimi Vitzthumb was exposed to hissing from French-loyalists who opposed her father's project, and her father was also accused by his adversaries of nepotism because of his daughter's favorable position.
