= Alexandre Bultos =

Belgian comic actor and theatre director

Alexandre Bultos (18 June 1749, Brussels - 20 September 1787) was a comic actor and theatre director from the Austrian Netherlands in the Holy Roman Empire.

== Life ==
The seventh child of Pierre-François Bultos and his wife Marie-Josèphe Lambert, wine merchants and hoteliers, Alexandre made his stage debut in December 1761 aged 12, in La Servante maîtresse by Pierre Baurans, after the work by Pergolesi, beside his close contemporary Angélique D'Hannetaire (like him, a student of Ignaz Vitzthumb, music-master of the Théâtre de la Monnaie). When this play was reprised two months later, François-Antoine de Chevrier wrote:

On Tuesday 16th, the child-players acted la servante Maitresse, and particularly admired was little Bultos in the role of Pandolphe - he is the son of a Brussels cafe owner, who developed into a comic-actor out of his own desire - thus it is astonishing that this little gentleman, with no examples of excellence around, has been able to acquire so many talents in so little time.

From 1767 to 1770 he was part of the Ghent troupe, acted at Strasbourg in 1770, and then acted at Maastricht in Charles Bernardy's troupe, before finally getting to Copenhagen under his own steam. Taken on at Brussels in 1772 as an ensemble member then as Laruette and his comic leads from 1773, he divided his duties with Dazincourt, which sometimes led to tension between Dazincourt and Bultos. Dazincourt left Brussels for Paris in 1776, leaving Bultos alone to fill the lead roles. In 1777 Bultos and his father obtained permission to open a Vauxhall in the Parc de Bruxelles and the same year Alexandre became co-director of the Théâtre de la Monnaie alongside Louis-Jean Pin. Five years later, he made his brother Herman (1752-1801) his co-director. Around 1785 he tried to make a debut at the Comédie-Française but was dissuaded by his contemporaries.

Preceded by Ignaz Vitzthumb	director of the Théâtre de la Monnaie; 1777-1783	Succeeded by Alexandre and Herman Bultos
Preceded by Louis-Jean Pin, Alexandre Bultos and Sophie Lothaire	director of the Théâtre de la Monnaie; 1783-1787	Succeeded by Herman Bultos
