= Royal Park Theatre =

Theatre in Brussels, Belgium

- Théâtre royal du Parc (French); Koninklijk Parktheater (Dutch)
- Théâtre du Parc or Parktheater
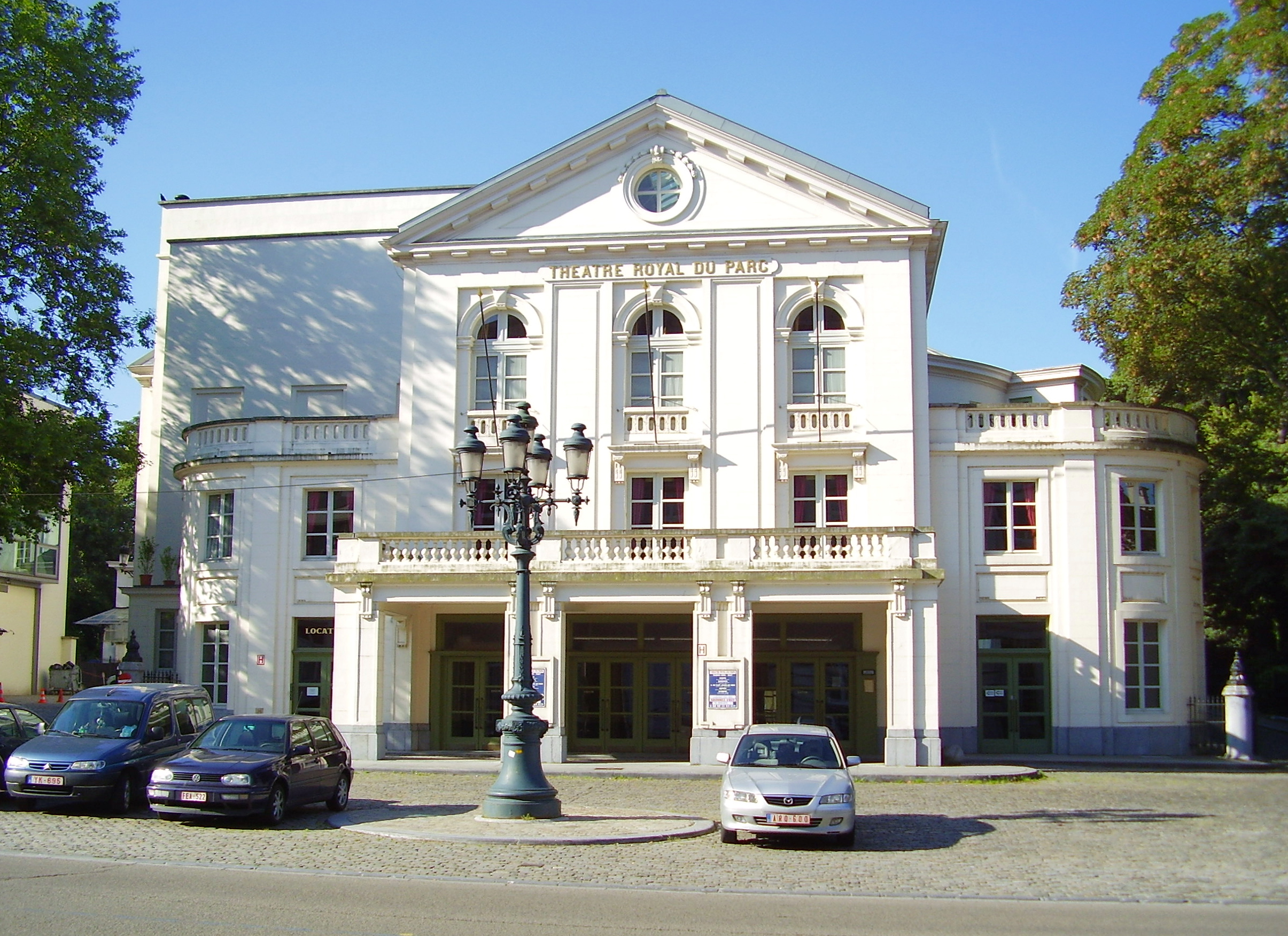
- The Royal Park Theatre seen from the Rue de la Loi/Wetstraat
- Interactive map of Royal Park Theatre
- Address: Rue de la Loi / Wetstraat 3; 1000 City of Brussels, Brussels-Capital Region; Belgium
- Coordinates: 50°50′45″N 4°21′56″E
- Type: Theatre
- Public transit: Brussels-Central; 1 5 Parc/Park and 1 2 5 6 Arts-Loi/Kunst-Wet

Construction
- Opened: 1782
- Years active: 1782–1807, 1814–present
- Architect: Louis Montoyer

Website
- www.theatreduparc.be

The Royal Park Theatre (French: Théâtre royal du Parc; Dutch: Koninklijk Parktheater) is a theatre in central Brussels, Belgium. It is located at 3, rue de la Loi/Wetstraat, on the edge of Brussels Park, facing the Belgian House of Parliament (Palace of the Nation).

== History ==
=== Early history ===
Built in 1782 to plans by the Belgian-Austrian architect Louis Montoyer, the Park Theatre was at first an annexe to the Theatre of La Monnaie. The brothers Alexandre and Herman Bultos exploited both theatres at the same time, with the Park Theatre used for plays featuring young actors, as a sort of drama school for La Monnaie. In 1807, under the French regime, it was closed by Napoleon's decree on the theatres, but re-opened in 1814, and was occupied by a British company for a year, then a Dutch company for a few months.

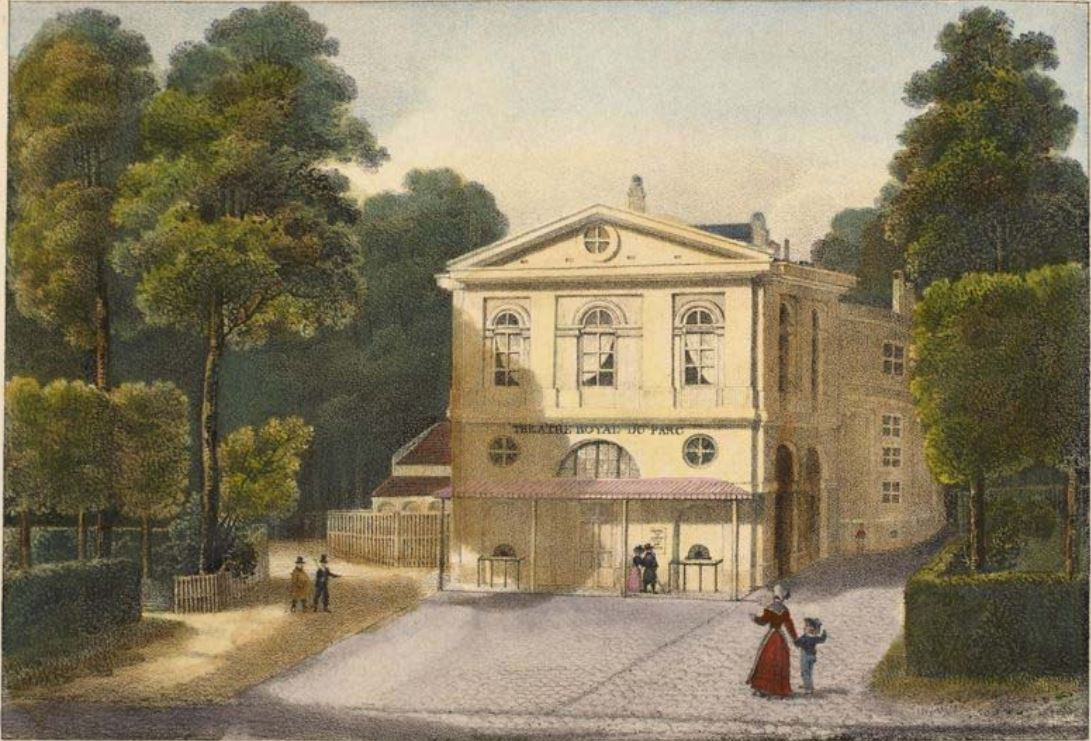
The Royal Park Theatre, c. 1830

From 1819, the City of Brussels, owner of these two Royal Theatres, granted a concession to one director after another. The company and repertoire were identical yet distinct, with the Park Theatre specialising in vaudeville and boulevard theatre. From 1850 to 1854, the Park Theatre hosted Dutch productions, then specialised in operetta and opéra-comique, and finally (from 1869) in comedies. During the First World War, both theatres were requisitioned and the Park Theatre became a playhouse for the German garrison. Returning as a francophone theatre in 1919, it put on classic pieces featuring Belgian actors.

=== Contemporary ===
From 1947 to 1964, under the direction of Oscar Lejeune, the theatre hosted a performance by the Comédie-Française every year. In 1976, the Royal Park Theatre became a "Public Utility Establishment", under the sole direction of Jean Nergal, who remained director until his death on 3 January 1987. Yves Larec was appointed director to succeed him; he took office on 1 February 1987. Under his direction, the Park Theatre was distinguished by a programme where classics and contemporary creations alternated, in spectacular staging and with a focus on comedies. After 24 years at the head of the theatre, Thierry Debroux succeeded Larec as director in 2010.

== See also ==
- History of Brussels
- Culture of Belgium
- Belgium in the long nineteenth century
