= Compain =

Compain is a surname. Notable people with the surname include:

- Louis Compain (1733 – after 1790), French actor and singer
- Louise Compain (1869–1940), French feminist author
- Megan Compain (born 1975), New Zealand basketball player who competed in the 2000 and 2004 Summer Olympics
