= Ignaz Vitzthumb =

Austrian musician, composer and conductor

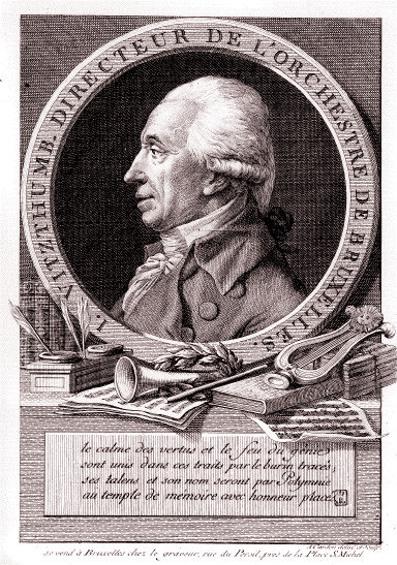
Ignace Vitzthumb, engraving by Cardon the elder (c. 1785). Brussels, Bibliothèque royale de Belgique

Ignaz or Ignace Vitzthumb (also Witzthumb; 14 September 1724 – 23 March 1816) was an Austrian musician, composer and conductor active in the Austrian Netherlands. He was also music director of the La Monnaie theatre in Brussels.

== Life ==
Vitzthumb was born in Baden bei Wien. Arriving in Brussels in 1735 at the age of 11, he entered the service of archduchess Maria Elisabeth of Austria as a child-singer in her choir. Taught by Jean-Joseph Fiocco, then choirmaster of the Brussels chapel royal, Vitzthumb became a court drummer at sixteen, a post he held for more than 40 years alongside other roles. His half-brother, François-Antoine Vitzthumb, was a trumpeter in the court and his son Paul Vitzthumb (1761–1838) succeeded him as court drummer.

After the War of the Austrian Succession, in which he had served in a regiment of Hungarian hussars, he returned to Brussels and took part in several chambers of rhetoric and compagnies bourgeoises, of which there were Francophone as well as Flemish versions. He showed off his talents as a violinist, conductor and theatre director, and was a member of the Concert bourgeois. He is also mentioned among the court musicians as a composer, tenor and violinist in 1758 and 1759, and as a composer from 1760 to 1775.

From 1761, he entered the Théâtre de la Monnaie as its composer and music master, and taught singing to young actors such as Angélique D'Hannetaire and Alexandre Bultos. In 1772, he and the singer Louis Compain became co-directors of the Théâtre, then Vitzthumb was sole director from 1774 to 1777. This period is considered to be one of the most fertile in the Théâtre de la Monnaie's life, and travellers like Charles Burney did not hesitate to praise the quality of the members of its acting troop and orchestra. Even so, the theatre soon went bankrupt and so Vitzthumb was forced to abandon his role as director, though he retained that of conductor. He founded the Opéra flamand in 1772.

Suspended from all his jobs in 1791 for taking part in the insurrection against Joseph II, Vitzthumb left for Amsterdam to take up a post as music master at the "Collège dramatique et lyrique". Falling seriously ill the following year, he returned to Brussels to live with his son Paul and died there in 1816, aged 91.

== Works ==
- Surviving
  - Céphalide ou les Autres mariages samnites, libretto by prince Charles-Joseph de Ligne (1777)
  - Lamentations of Jeremiah for Holy Week (manuscript fragments)
  - Symphonies (manuscript fragments)
  - Sinfonia a più stromenti
  - Recueils d'ariettes d'opéra (arrangements of 14 verses, 1775-1786)
- Lost
  - La Fausse esclave (1761)
  - L'Éloge de la vertu ou le Tribut des cœurs, libretto by Louis Compain (1761)
  - Le Soldat par amour, with Pieter van Maldere, libretto by Jean-François de Bastide (1766)
  - La Foire de village, libretto by François-Xavier Pagès (1786)

== Sources ==
- Opera Glass
- Dominique Dujardin. The New Grove Dictionary of Opera, edited by Stanley Sadie (1992). ISBN 0-333-73432-7 and ISBN 1-56159-228-5

Preceded by D'Hannetaire and the "Comédiens associés"	director of the Théâtre de la Monnaie; With Louis Compain until 1776; 1772–1777	Succeeded by Louis-Jean Pin, Alexandre Bultos and Sophie Lothaire
