= Pieter van Maldere =

Flemish violinist and composer

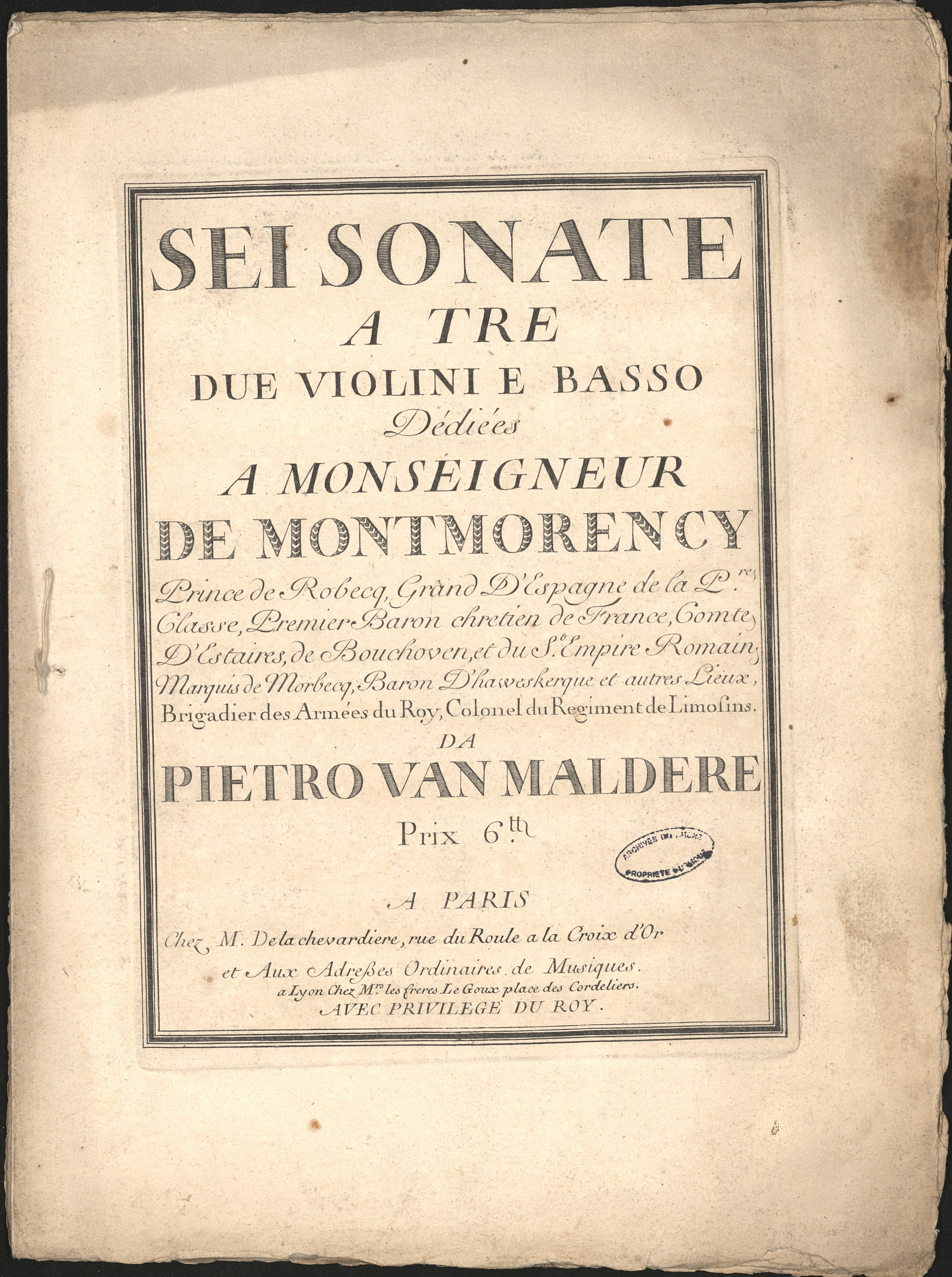
Title page of the 'Sei Sonate a tre due violini e basso'

Pieter van Maldere, known also as Pierre van Maldere (16 October 1729 – 1 November 1768) was a Flemish violinist and composer. He was a violinist of the Royal Chapel, the court orchestra in Brussels of the governor-general of the Austrian Netherlands, Prince Charles Alexander of Lorraine. After an international career which brought him to Dublin, Paris and Vienna, he returned to Brussels where he became a director of the Brussels opera house (De Munt/La Monnaie). He was the leading composer of the Austrian Netherlands in the mid-18th century. His symphonies, exemplary for the galant style, merged French stylistic elements with Viennese and Italian influences.

== Life ==
Van Maldere was born in Brussels and educated as a violinist and composer, probably by the Kapellmeisters of the Brussels Royal Chapel, first Jean-Joseph Fiocco and later Henri-Jacques de Croes. From 1749 he was a violinist at the Royal Chapel, the court orchestra of the Austrian Netherlands, Prince Charles Alexander of Lorraine. From 1751 to 1753, van Maldere was director of the Philarmonick Concerts in Dublin. William Manwaring published the Six Trios for 2 Fiddles and thorough Bass composed by Sieur Van Maldere in Dublin in December 1752. Van Maldere played in the Paris Concert Spirituel in August 1754. He accompanied Prince Charles Alexander on his many travels, to France (Paris), Bohemia (Prague) and Austria (Vienna), where his two first comic operas were performed in Schönbrunn: Le Déguisement pastoral (1756) and Les Amours champêtres (1758). Van Maldere also performed for the empress Maria Theresia in Vienna.

After his return to Brussels, Van Maldere composed a number of operas and over 40 symphonies, ouvertures and sonatas. In 1758, he was promoted valet de chambre to the prince. Mozart met van Maldere in Brussels during his first international tour as a child prodigy. From 1763 to 1767, he was co-director of the Grand Théâtre (Muntschouwburg, Théâtre de la Monnaie), a period which ended in a financial fiasco. Ignaz Vitzthumb (1724–1816) was the conductor of the Muntschouwburg in those years. Van Maldere's students at the Royal Chapel included the violinist Joseph Gehot (1756 - after 1795) and the clarinettist Amand Vanderhagen (1753–1822). Van Maldere enjoyed an international reputation. Both Mozart and Haydn were familiar with his work. The Austrian composer Carl Ditters von Dittersdorf noted him as one of the most important virtuosi of his time.

Van Maldere died in Brussels. After his death, his brother succeeded him as the first violinist of the Royal Chapel.

== Works ==
While van Maldere's chamber music shows late-baroque characteristics and Corelli's influence, his violin sonatas and symphonies testify to the formation of the early classical "Viennese" symphony. Most of the symphonies are in three parts, and contain elements as thematic contrast or modulating development. The second movement sometimes is a binary Lied form, the final occasionally a rondo form. A number of works have the "classical" four movements (RomM 51 in C, and 120 in F; the Sonata a 3, RomM 20 in D).

Van Maldere's works circulated throughout Europe in manuscript parts as well as in print. According to RISM (Répertoire International de Sources Musicales), manuscripts of his works are found in 21 libraries in ten different countries (Belgium, Czech Republic, Denmark, Germany, Hungary, Italy, Slovakia, Sweden, Switzerland, and the United States).

Van Maldere's compositions were printed by publishers in London, Paris, Dublin and Brussels; even after his death reprints were issued, such as the Six favourite overtures in 8 parts, opus 4 (London, c.1770).

Only one source of van Maldere's vocal compositions has survived: his opéra-comique "Le Déguisement pastoral" (1756) is kept at the Österreichische Nationalbibliothek in Vienna.

A popular vocal composition to music by van Maldere was Ach wiederholt mir Jesu Leiden, an arrangement of the Grave movement from his Symphony, Op. 4 No. 5, for two sopranos, strings and bass (one source has two flutes added).

A number of his works were attributed to other composers, such as Joseph Haydn (RomM 80 in B♭) and Josef Mysliveček, whose symphony in C turned out to be van Maldere's Op. 4 No. 2.

=== Principal compositions ===
- Many violin- and triosonatas, of which 3 trios for harpsichord, violin and cello op. 7, published posthumously by Van Ypen & Pris in Brussels, between 1774 and 1778.
- Overtures
- Some 45 symphonies, among which:
  - Sei sinfonie a più stromenti (dedicated to the duke d'Antin, ca. 1760)
  - Sei sinfonie a più stromenti (Paris, 1762) (without basso continuo, influenced by the Mannheim school)
  - Sei sinfonie a più stromenti opus 4 (Paris and Lyon, 1764)
  - Sei sinfonie a più stromenti opus 5 (Paris, 1768)
- Operas
  - 1756: Le Déguisement pastoral (Vienna, Schönbrunn, 12 July) (Later performance: Brussels, 12 December 1759)
  - 1758: Les Amours champêtres (Vienna, Schönbrunn, 5 November)
  - 1763: La Bagarre (Paris, Théâtre italien, 10 February, 7 July, in collaboration with François-André Danican Philidor?)
  - 1766: Le Médecin de l'amour (Brussels, date unknown; for an illustration, see the French Wikipedia) (libretto by Louis Anseaume and Pierre-Augustin Lefèvre de Marcouville)
  - 1766: Le Soldat par amour (Brussels, 4 November, in collaboration with Ignaz Vitzthumb)

=== List of instrumental works ===
- VR 1 – Trio Sonata in D major
- VR 2 – Trio Sonata in G major
- VR 3 – Trio Sonata in A major
- VR 4 – Trio Sonata in C major
- VR 5 – Trio Sonata in E♭ major
- VR 6 – Trio Sonata in D minor
- VR 7 – Trio Sonata in G major
- VR 8 – Trio Sonata in F major
- VR 9 – Trio Sonata in B♭ major
- VR 10 – Trio Sonata in C major
- VR 11 – Trio Sonata in G major
- VR 12 – Trio Sonata in D major, Op. 1 No. 1
- VR 13 – Trio Sonata in A major, Op. 1 No. 2
- VR 14 – Trio Sonata in C minor
- VR 15 – Trio Sonata in E♭ major
- VR 16 – Trio Sonata in E minor
- VR 17 – Trio Sonata in B minor
- VR 18 – Trio Sonata in F minor
- VR 19 – Trio Sonata in F major
- VR 20 – Trio Sonata in C major
- VR 21 – Trio Sonata in F major
- VR 22 – Trio Sonata in D minor
- VR 23 – Trio Sonata in A major
- VR 24 – Trio Sonata in B♭ major, Op. 1 No. 3
- VR 25 – Trio Sonata in G minor, Op. 1 No. 4
- VR 26 – Trio Sonata in D major, Op. 1 No. 5
- VR 27 – Trio Sonata in C major, Op. 1 No. 6
- VR 28 – Symphony in G major
- VR 29 – Symphony in F major
- VR 30 – Symphony in D major
- VR 31 – Symphony in C major
- VR 32 – Symphony in E♭ major
- VR 33 – Symphony in F major
- VR 34 – Symphony in B♭ major
- VR 35 – Symphony in A major
- VR 36 – Symphony in F major
- VR 37 – Symphony in C major
- VR 38 – Symphony in D major
- VR 39 – Symphony in C major* (lost)
- VR 40 – Symphony in E major
- VR 41 – Symphony in A major
- VR 42 – Symphony in G minor
- VR 43 – Symphony in D major
- VR 44 – Symphony in B♭ major
- VR 45 – Symphony in A major
- VR 46 – Violin Sonata in B♭ major
- VR 47 – Violin Sonata in C major
- VR 48 – Violin Sonata in D major
- VR 49 – Violin Sonata in A major
- VR 50 – Violin Sonata in F major
- VR 51 – Violin Sonata in A major
- VR 52 – Violin Sonata in F major
- VR 53 – Symphony in G minor, Op. 4 No. 1
- VR 54 – Symphony in C major, Op. 4 No. 2
- VR 55 – Symphony in B♭ major, Op. 4 No. 3
- VR 56 – Symphony in G major, Op. 4 No. 4
- VR 57 – Symphony in E♭ major, Op. 4 No. 5
- VR 58 – Symphony in D major, Op. 4 No. 6
- VR 59 – Symphony in E♭ major
- VR 60 – Symphony in G major
- VR 61 – Symphony in C major
- VR 62 – Symphony in D major
- VR 63 – Symphony in F major
- VR 64 – Symphony in C major
- VR 65 – Symphony in E♭ major
- VR 66 – Symphony in D major
- VR 67 – Violin Sonata in G major, Op. 5 No. 1
- VR 68 – Violin Sonata in C major, Op. 5 No. 2
- VR 69 – Violin Sonata in E major, Op. 5 No. 3
- VR 70 – Violin Sonata in D major, Op. 5 No. 4
- VR 71 – Violin Sonata in D major, Op. 5 No. 5
- VR 72 – Violin Sonata in G major, Op. 5 No. 6
- VR 73 – Symphony in D major, Op. 5 No. 1
- VR 74 – Symphony in F major, Op. 5 No. 2
- VR 75 – Symphony in E♭ major, Op. 5 No. 3
- VR 76 – Symphony in B♭ major, Op. 5 No. 4
- VR 77 – Symphony in G major, Op. 5 No. 5
- VR 78 – Symphony in D major, Op. 5 No. 6
- VR 79 – Symphony in D minor
- VR 80 – Symphony in E♭ major
- VR 81 – Symphony in B♭ major
- VR 82 – Symphony in F major
- VR 83 – Symphony in D major
- VR 84 – Keyboard Trio No. 1 in C major, Op. 7 No. 1
- VR 85 – Keyboard Trio No. 2 in G major, Op. 7 No. 2
- VR 86 – Keyboard Trio No. 3 in D major, Op. 7 No.3
- VR 87 – Violin Sonata in B♭ major
- VR 88 – Violin Sonata in A major

=== Editions ===
- Van Maldere, Pierre, VI Sonatas for Two Violins with a Bass for the Harpsichord, for Violoncello (Facsimile Series for Musicians and Scholars, vol. 30) (Peer: Musica-Alamire, 1989).
- Craig Lister (ed.): Pierre van Maldere: Six Symphonies a più strumenti, opus 4 (Recent Researches in the Music of the Classical Era, vols 35–36) (Madison, WI: A-R Editions, 1990).

== Bibliography ==
- Charles Burney: The Present State of Music in Germany, the Netherlands, and the United Provinces (London, 1773; London: Beckett, 1775²; reprint 1775² (Monuments of Music and Music Literature in Facsimile, vol. 117) (New York: Broude, 1969).
- François-Joseph Fétis. "Van Maldere (Pierre)", in Biographie universelle des musiciens et bibliographie générale de la musique, 2nd ed., vol. 8 (Paris: Firmin-Didot, 1884), p. 306–307.
- Suzanne Clercx: Pierre van Maldere. Virtuose et maître des concerts de Charles de Lorraine (1729–1768) (Brussels: Palais des Académies, 1948).
- Albert van der Linden: "Notes inédites sur Pierre Van Maldere et ses frères", in Belgisch Tijdschrift voor Muziekwetenschap / Revue belge de musicologie, vol. 3 (1949), p. 46–49.
- Sem Porter Kegley: A Preliminary Study of the Symphonies of Pierre van Maldere, M.M. thesis, Wichita State University, Kansas, 1976.
- Willy van Rompaey: Pieter van Maldere, 1729–1768. Thematische catalogus van de instrumentale werken met voorbeelden in partituurvorm [Thematic catalogue of the instrumental works] (Aartselaar, 1990).
- Filip Bral: "Brussels muzikale zoon" ["A musical son of Brussels"], in Muziek en Woord, vol. 27 (2001), p. 17.
- Koen Buyens: "Henri-Jacques de Croes and the Court Chapel of Charles of Lorraine. A Socio-Historical Perspective", in Belgisch Tijdschrift voor Muziekwetenschap / Revue belge de musicologie, vol. 55 (2001), p. 165–178.
- Koen Buyens: Musici aan het hof. De Brusselse hofkapel onder Henri-Jacques De Croes (1749–1786): Een sociaal-historische studie [Musicians At Court. The Brussels Court Chapel led by Henri-Jacques De Croes (1749–1786): A Social-Historical Study] (Brussels: VUB Press, 2001).

== Selected discography ==
- Symphony in C major VR 31; Symphony in D major VR 73; Sonata à violino solo e basso VR 48: Vienna Consortium di rci e fiati, conducted by Filip Bral, Eurynome 002 (CD, 1995).
- Pieter van Maldere. Symphoniae: Collegium instrumentale Brugense, conducted by Patrick Peire, Eufoda 1206 (CD, 2002).
- Pieter van Maldere. Sinfonie: The Academy of Ancient Music, conducted by Filip Bral, Klara MMP 012 (CD, undated).
- Symphony in G major VR 28: Irish Baroque Orchestra, conducted by Peter Whelan, Linn Records CKD 639 (CD, 2021)
