= Jean-Pierre-Paul Adam =

French actor

Jean-Pierre-Paul Adam was a late 18th and early 19th century French actor.

Born in Rouen, he arrived in Ghent in 1782 and there played tragic and comic leads in Casimir's company, before becoming co-director of the company with Casimir and Dorgeville in 1784. The following year and several other actors in Ghent were taken on in Brussels, where he and Herman Bultos headed the Théâtre de la Monnaie from 1791 to 1793, with Adam all the while continuing to play lead rôles. During the troubles that followed the Brabant Revolution (1787–90), Adam and his wife took refuge in The Hague, where they (like Herman Bultos) took ship for Hamburg. Adam later returned to France, acting at Paris's Théâtre de la Gaîté in 1810 and the Ambigu-Comique (1811–16).

Preceded by Herman Bultos	director of the Théâtre de la Monnaie; 1791-1793	Succeeded by Mademoiselle Montansier
