= Jean-Joseph Fiocco =

Flemish composer

Jean-Joseph Fiocco (15 December 1686 – 30 March 1746) was a Flemish composer of the high and late Baroque period.

His father was the Venetian composer Pietro Antonio Fiocco (1654–1714), and his brothers included the violinist Joseph-Hector. Jean-Joseph was active in the Austrian Netherlands and - during his time as choirmaster of Maria Elisabeth of Austria's chapel-royal in Brussels - he trained the composer Ignaz Vitzthumb and the violinist Pieter van Maldere. Fiocco's main works were nine Repons de mort, to French texts, now thought to be lost.

== Sources ==
- The New Grove Dictionary of Music and Musicians
