= Larive =

French actor (1747–1827)

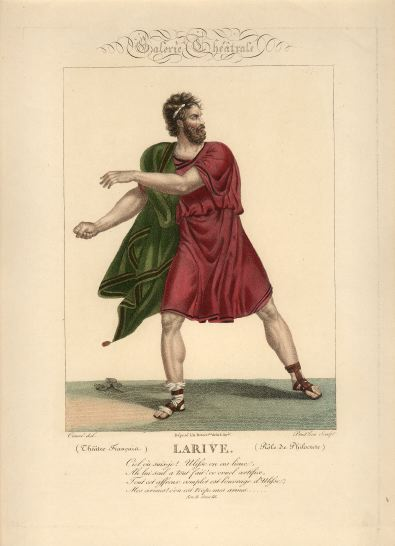
Larive in the rôle of Philoctète, engraving by Prud'hon after Cœuré (c. 1820).

Jean Mauduit, stage name Larive or de La Rive (6 August 1747 in La Rochelle – 30 April 1827 in Montlignon), was a French actor.

== Life ==
The son of a grocer, he left his father's home to devote himself to the theatre and presented himself to Lekain in Paris for a job. Engaged in Madame Montansier's company, he played at Tours, then at Lyon, and came back to Paris where Mademoiselle Clairon took him under her protection.

Larive made his debut at the Comédie-Française on 3 December 1770 but was not well received. He left for Brussels where D'Hannetaire engaged him for the lead rôles at the Théâtre de la Monnaie and where he spent 4 years, acting alongside Dazincourt, Grandmesnil and Florence. It was here that he got to known his future wife, Eugénie D'Hannetaire, the director's eldest daughter, whom he married in Paris on 18 June 1776 (they divorced in 1794). He was a friend of Voltaire and interpreted many of his lead roles.

On 29 April 1775, Larive made another first appearance at the Comédie-Française and was admitted as a sociétaire on the following 18 May. Three years later, the death of Lekain put him in first place among the sociétaires. He regularly toured the provinces and appeared in his birthplace in 1780, as well as in Lille, Geneva and Bordeaux. He left the Comédie-Française in 1788 but returned to it in 1790, after appearing in Lille.

Supplanted by Talma, he was imprisoned several times during the French Revolution and retired to his property at Montlignon, becoming the town's mayor.

== Works ==
- Réflexions sur l'art théâtral (1801)
- Cours de déclamation (1810)

These were both referred to by Louis Jouvet in his course at the Conservatoire.

== Selected Roles ==
- The Count of Pienne in L’amant bourru by Jacques Marie Boutet (1777)

== See also ==
- Troupe of the Comédie-Française in 1790
