= Louis-Jean Pin =

French comic-actor and theatre director

Louis-Jean Pin (born 1734, date of death unknown) was a French comic-actor and theatre director. He was born in Paris.

== Life ==
He headed the Montpellier company during the 1757-1758 season, then made his début at the Comédie-Française on 5 December 1765. Effectively combining the professions of actor and rich businessman, he spent some years at the Théâtre-Français before leaving it in December 1771. Touring the provinces, he came to the Théâtre de la Monnaie in Brussels in 1773, before playing at Valenciennes the following year. He returned to Brussels to deal with costumes and finance during the 1774-1775 season, and co-directed the Théâtre de la Monnaie with Alexandre Bultos and Sophie Lothaire from 1777 to 1783. He afterwards returned to Paris to devote himself to business and seems to have abandoned the stage.

Preceded by Ignaz Vitzthumb	director of the Théâtre de la Monnaie; 1777-1783	Succeeded by Alexandre and Herman Bultos
