= Eugénie D'Hannetaire =

French actress

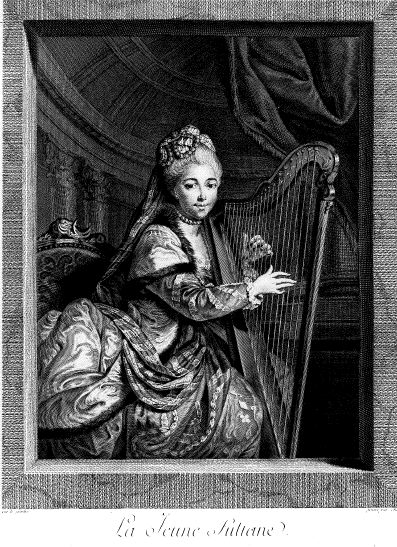
Eugenie DHannetaire by Juste Chevillet

Marie-Louis-Philippine-Eugénie Servandoni (6 January 1746, Brussels - 22 February 1816, Paris), stage name Eugénie D'Hannetaire, was a French actress.

She was the daughter of the actor-director D'Hannetaire and the actress Marguerite Huet (stage name Mlle Eugénie). She made her debut at the Théâtre de la Monnaie aged 8, in child roles, then from 15 as a dancer. She is reported to have succeeded her mother in her roles as a soubrette. She left Brussels in 1773 and in Lyon married the comic-actor Larive, from whom she divorced 20 years later. Prince Charles-Joseph de Ligne vowed her his boundless admiration and dedicated his Lettres à Eugénie sur les spectacles (1774) to her.

== Bibliography ==
- Henri Liebrecht: Histoire du théatre français à Bruxelles au XVIIe et au XVIIIe siècle
