= Brussels Park =

Park in Brussels, Belgium

- Parc de Bruxelles (French); Warandepark (Dutch)
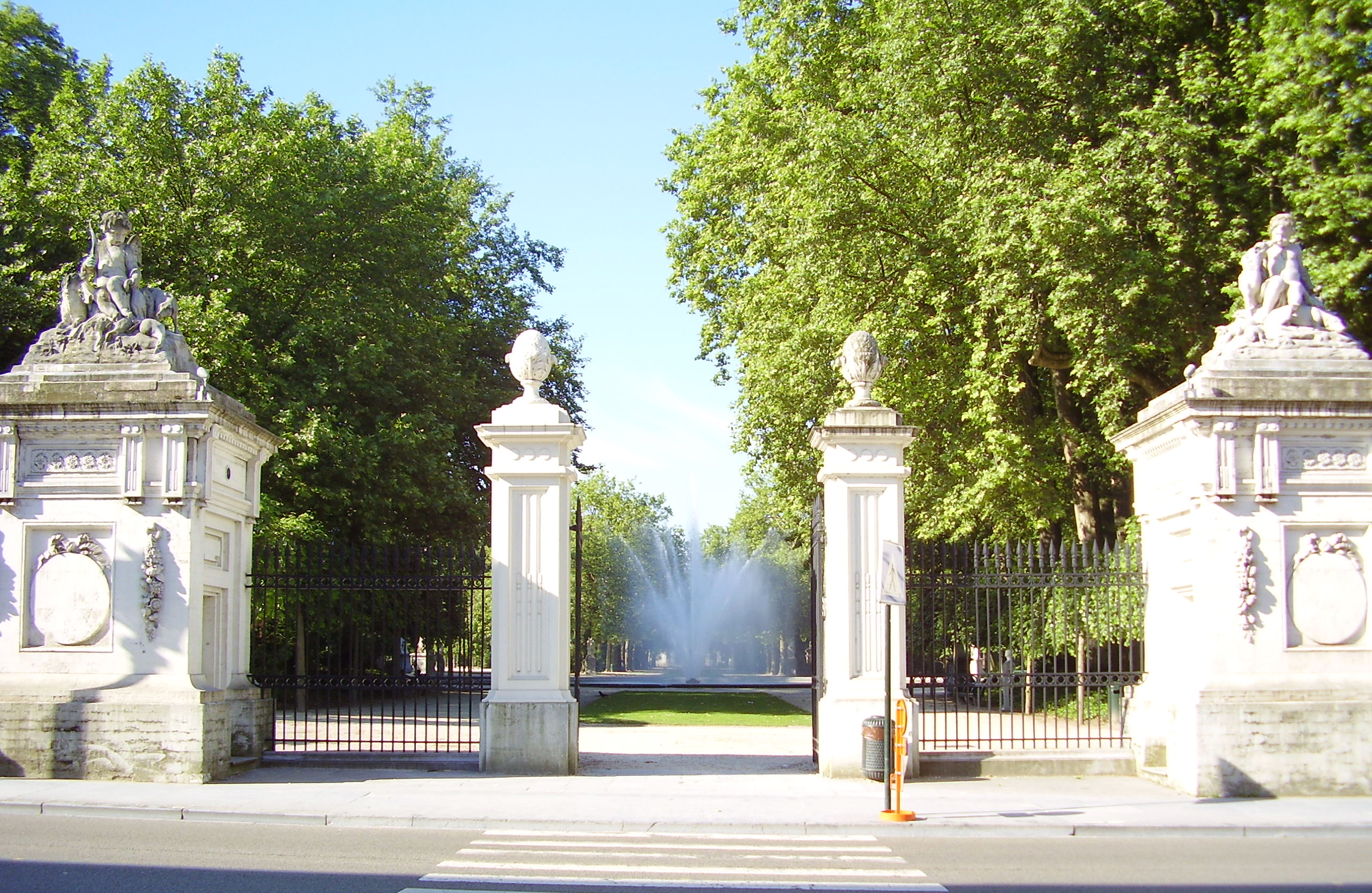
- Brussels Park's monumental entrance from the Rue de la Loi/Wetstraat
- Interactive map of Brussels Park
- Type: Public park
- Location: City of Brussels, Brussels-Capital Region, Belgium
- Coordinates: 50°50′40″N 4°21′50″E
- Area: 13.1 ha (32 acres)
- Created: 1776–1783
- Status: Open year-round
- Public transit: Brussels-Central; 1 5 Parc/Park and 2 6 Trône/Troon

Brussels Park (French: Parc de Bruxelles [paʁk də bʁysɛl]; Dutch: Warandepark [ʋaːˈrɑndəˌpɑr(ə)k] or Park van Brussel [ˈpɑr(ə)k fɑm ˈbrʏsəl]) is the largest urban public park in central Brussels, Belgium. The park was formerly known and is still sometimes colloquially referred to as the Royal Park (Note: The current Royal Park is in Laeken (northern part of the City of Brussels), opposite the Royal Palace of Laeken and the Royal Domain, and is accessible by the Avenue du Parc royal/Koninklijk Parklaan.) (French: Parc royal [paʁk ʁwajal]; Dutch: Koninklijk Park [ˈkoːnɪŋklək ˈpɑr(ə)k]). It was the city's first public park, being originally laid out between 1776 and 1783 in a neoclassical style by the French architect Gilles-Barnabé Guimard and the Austrian landscape architect Joachim Zinner, as part of an urban project including the Place Royale/Koningsplein. The area of the rectangular park is 13.1 ha (32 acres).

The park is surrounded by the Place des Palais/Paleizenplein to the south, the Rue Royale/Koningsstraat to the west, the Rue de la Loi/Wetstraat to the north and the Rue Ducale/Hertogstraat to the east. The main entrance is on the northern side, opposite the Belgian House of Parliament (Palace of the Nation). An avenue leads to the main pond, from which three other avenues offer views of three important places in Brussels: the Palace of Justice, the Royal Palace and the Place du Trône/Troonplein.

== History ==
=== Origins ===
Brussels Park lies on the site of the gardens of the former Palace of Coudenberg, which had been used since the Middle Ages as a hunting ground by the Dukes of Brabant. These grounds were divided into two parts: a large park known as the Warande (game reserve), which extended, towards the end of the reign of Holy Roman Emperor Charles V, as far north as the Rue de Louvain/Leuvensestraat and south as the ramparts at the Namur Gate; and a small park, located in the Koperbeek valley, between the back of the palace and the Sonian Forest. This small park included a private ornamental garden, which, in the course of its successive redevelopments, was sometimes called leafy, sometimes labyrinth because its landscaping, porticos and basins evoked the Corinthian labyrinth. The opposite hill was occupied by a vineyard that was used until the 16th century, an orangery and aviaries with exotic birds. Further in the valley, the park was embellished with a flower garden and a pond. With its water basins, fountains, imitation rock caves and numerous statues, this Warande Park, as Governor-General Maria Elisabeth of Austria would have known it, was one of the most beautiful in Europe.

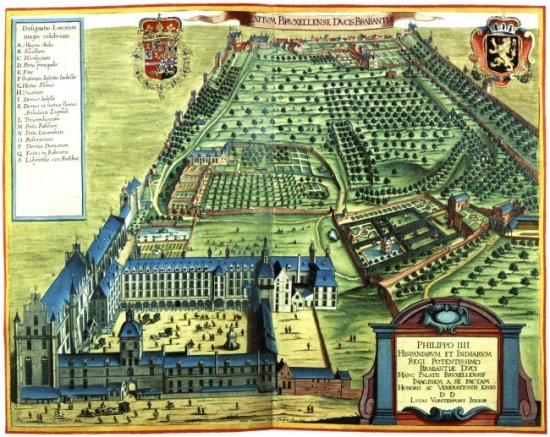
The palace and gardens of Coudenberg in 1659, L. Vorsterman the Younger

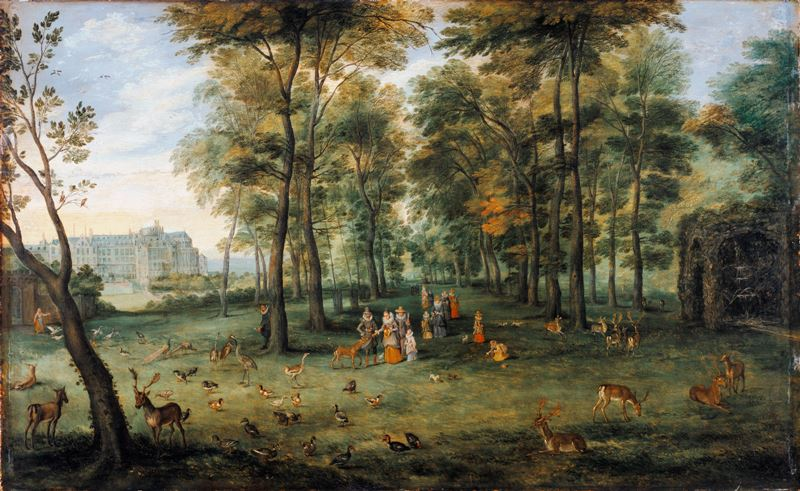
The archdukes Albert and Isabella walking in the park of their Brussels palace, Jan Bruegel the Elder, c. 1609–1621

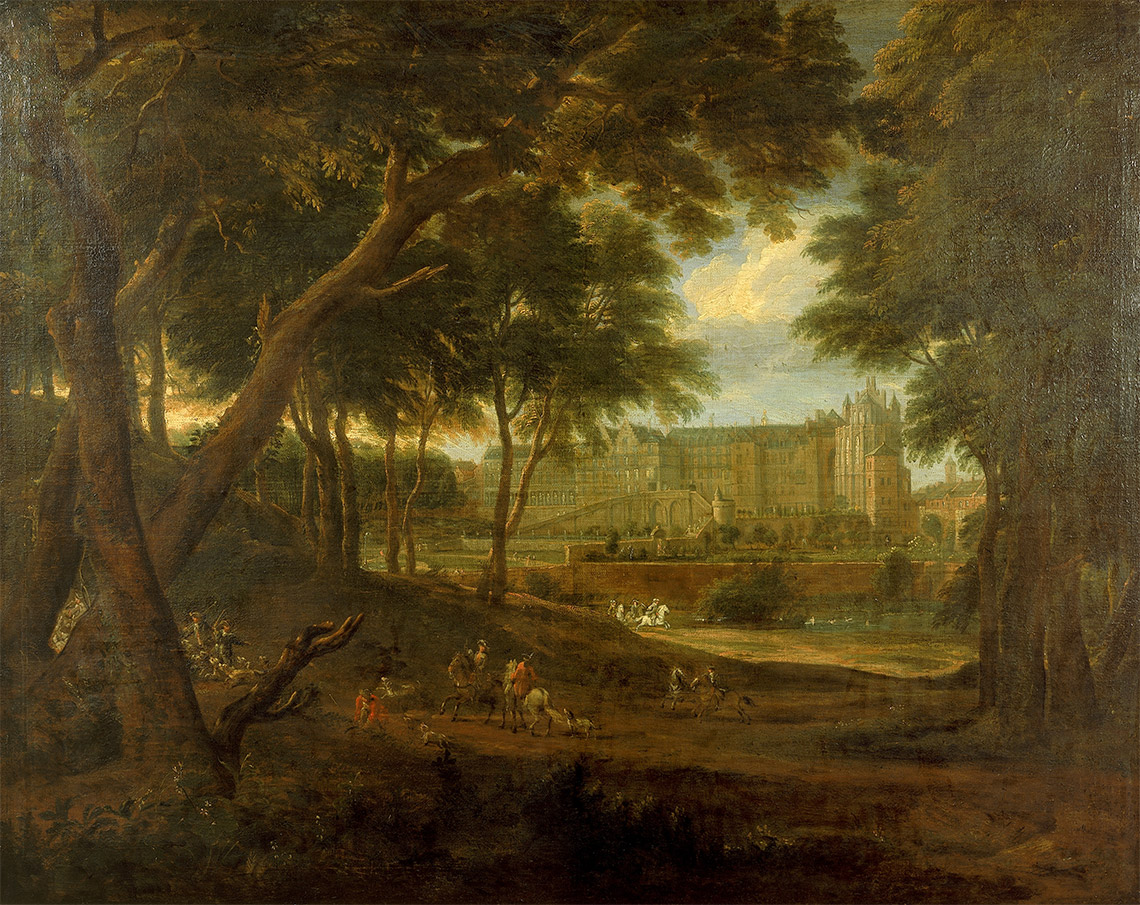
Hunting scene in the park of the Coudenberg Palace, Ignatius van der Stock, early 17th century

=== Destruction and redesign ===
The palace burned down on the night of 3 February 1731 in a fire that took much of the original royal complex. This left behind a field of ruins and a neglected park. Some proposed a partial reconstruction of the site, but the money was lacking. It was not until 1769, in commemoration of the twenty-fifth anniversary of Prince Charles Alexander of Lorraine's reign as Governor-General of the Austrian Netherlands, that the States of Brabant, the representation of the three estates (nobility, clergy and commoners) to the court of the Duke of Brabant, proposed to erect a statue in his honour. Georg Adam von Starhemberg, minister plenipotentiary to Empress Maria Theresa, suggested placing it before the ruins that had been levelled for the occasion. In the process, he proposed enlarging the former square in front of the palace, lining it with regular buildings and redesigning the park.

At the same time, the Viennese representative informed the Brussels' authorities of the governor's wish for the old park to be given a new shape "in order to increase the comfort of the public in this way and at the same time contribute to the embellishment of the capital and to make it by this means worthy of the stay of the Court and the curiosity of foreigners". The Empress granted conditional approval on 1 July 1775, provided that the City of Brussels would bear the costs. The city undertook the levelling of the ground for the construction of the park and the three adjacent roads—the Rue Royale/Koningsstraat, the Rue du Brabant/Brabantstraat (now the Rue de la Loi/Wetstraat) and the Rue Ducale/Hertogstraat—while the government took charge of the development of the park itself.

The new park was designed and laid out between 1776 and 1783 in a neoclassical style by the French architect Gilles-Barnabé Guimard and the Austrian landscape architect Joachim Zinner, as part of an urban project including the Place Royale/Koningsplein. This park resolutely marked a break with the past, everything having been flattened and redone for the occasion; 1,218 trees were felled to trace the new paths and another 3,284 were planted. This marked the first major work of proactive urban planning carried out in Brussels to completely renew an entire district of the city.

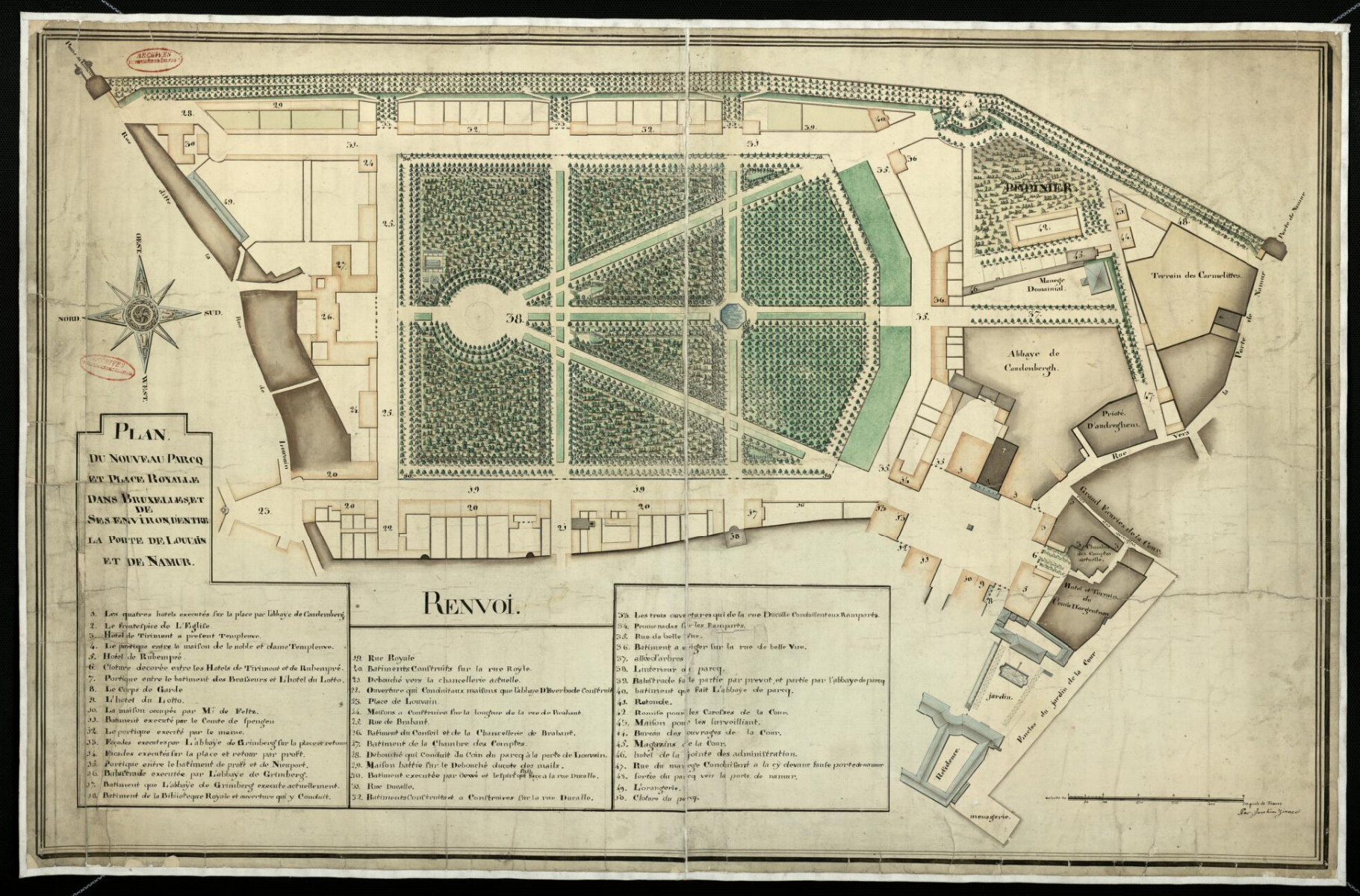
Plan of the Place Royale/Koningsplein and Brussels Park by Joachim Zinner, 1780

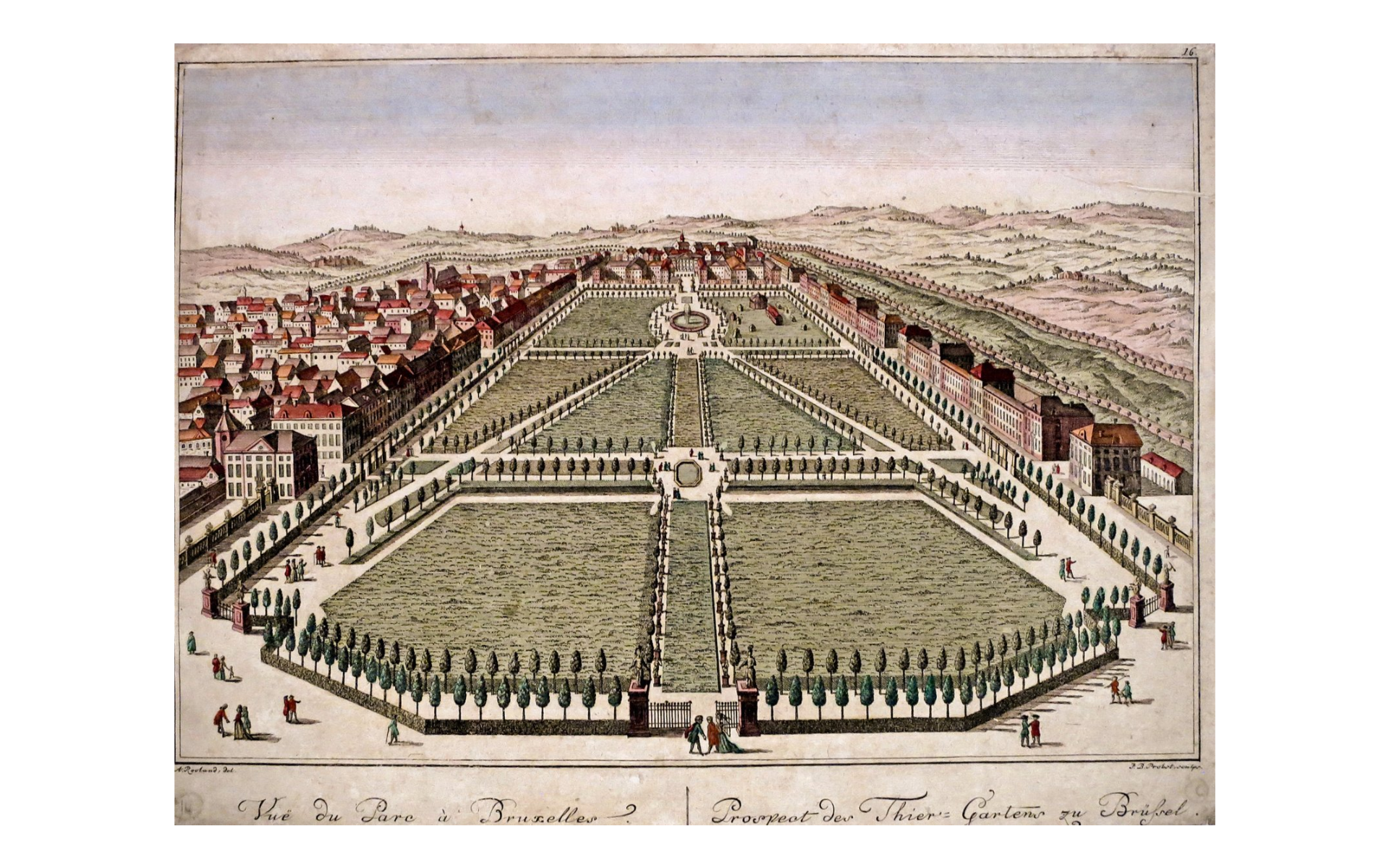
View of Brussels Park, coloured etching engraved by J.B. Probst after A. Rooland, c. 1775–1800

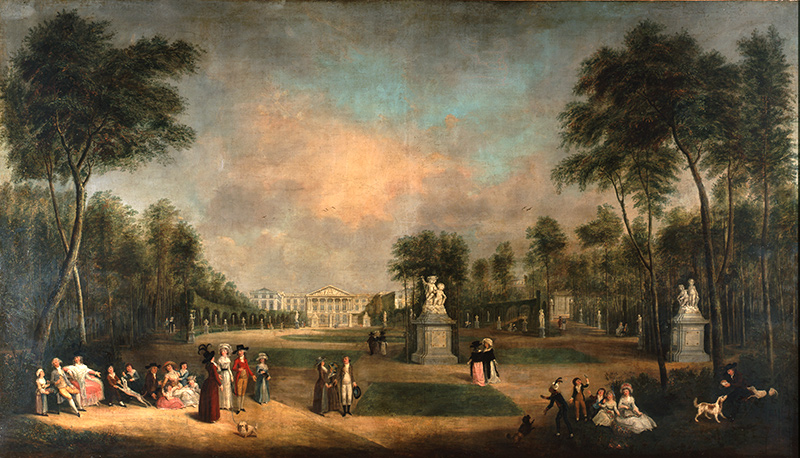
Brussels Park and the Palace of the Council of Brabant, Aurèle-Augustin Simons, 1789

=== Later history ===
The park witnessed many events unfold during its history. In 1793, French Revolutionaries known as the sans-culottes destroyed the sculptures and overthrew the busts of the Roman emperors that adorned it. The City of Brussels, which had managed the park since 1797 before becoming its owner by royal decree of 23 April 1817, took it upon itself to repair the damage and soon repopulated the park with its current statues and busts. Lack of money led the city to organise a public subscription, after which management of the park's maintenance was entrusted to the good care of the thirty most generous donors. The results greatly exceeded expectations and the victorious patrons elected seven representatives to form the park's management committee. In 1830, during the Belgian Revolution, which led to the separation of the Southern Netherlands, it served as a refuge for the army of the United Kingdom of the Netherlands.

Since the 19th century, the park has been surrounded by a double row of lime trees, which emphasises the perspectives on either side. The establishment of the Academy Palace and the Royal Palace modified its western flank in the 1820s. The monumental neoclassical railings surrounding the park were installed in 1849, using public funding and based on the designs by the architect Tilman-François Suys. The southern entrance to the central path was designed by the architect Joseph Poelaert in 1857 and executed in 1858, before being moved further north in 1904–1908.

In the 20th century, a large number of buildings surrounding the park were demolished and rebuilt, sometimes without respecting their original appearance and swapping the painted coating for a white stone facing. The first sports activities were organised in the park in 1920. In the 1930s, it was fitted with Art Deco lampposts and a bunker was built underneath it, connected by tunnels to the House of Parliament. In the 1960s, an entrance was built in the north-western corner to access the underground Parc/Park metro station. Classified as a protected site in 1972, the park now belongs to the Brussels Region, which manages and maintains it. It was most recently renovated between 2000 and 2002.

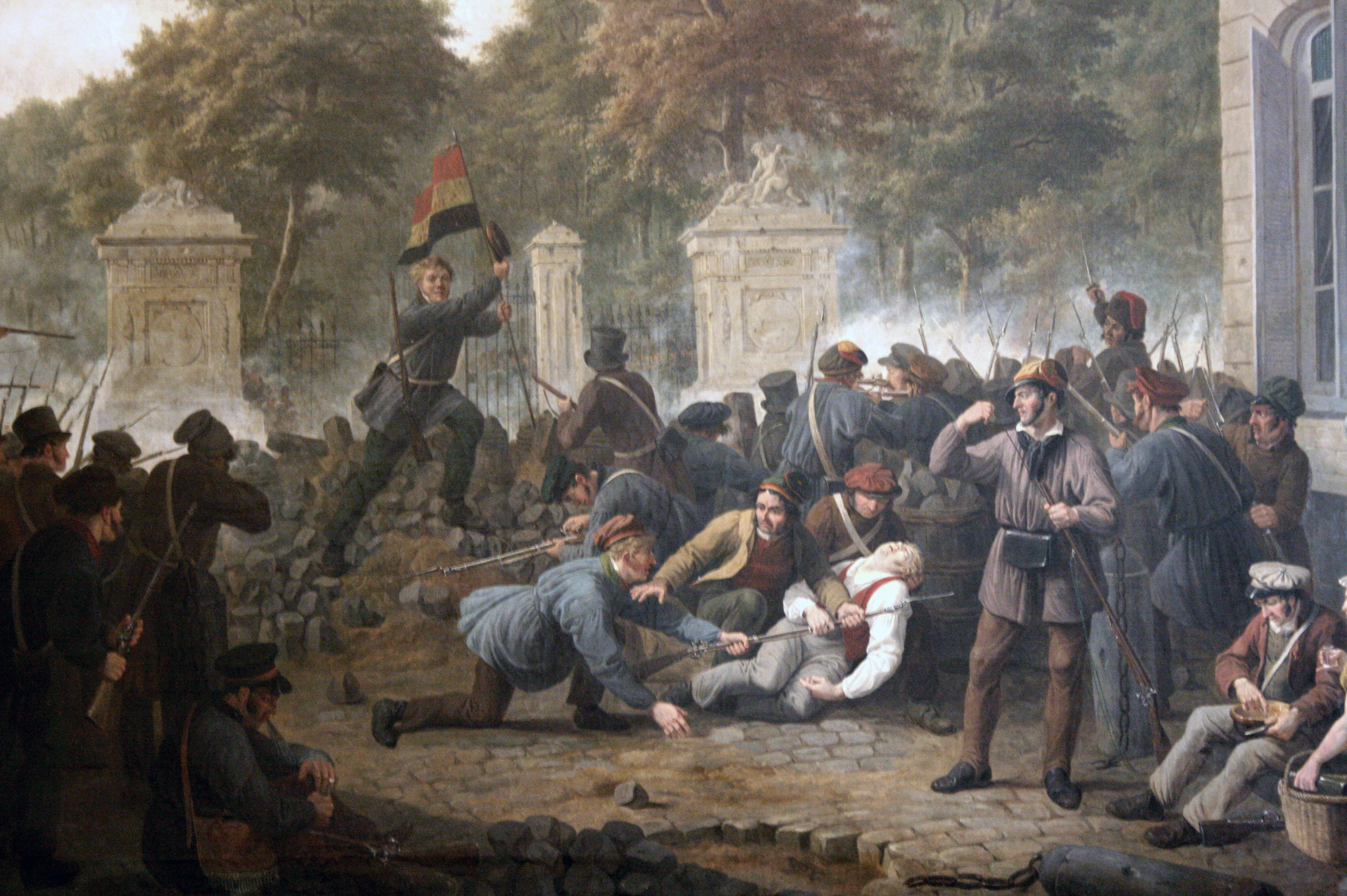
Assault on the Park of Brussels, a scene from the Belgian Revolution (Constantinus Fidelio Coene, 1830)

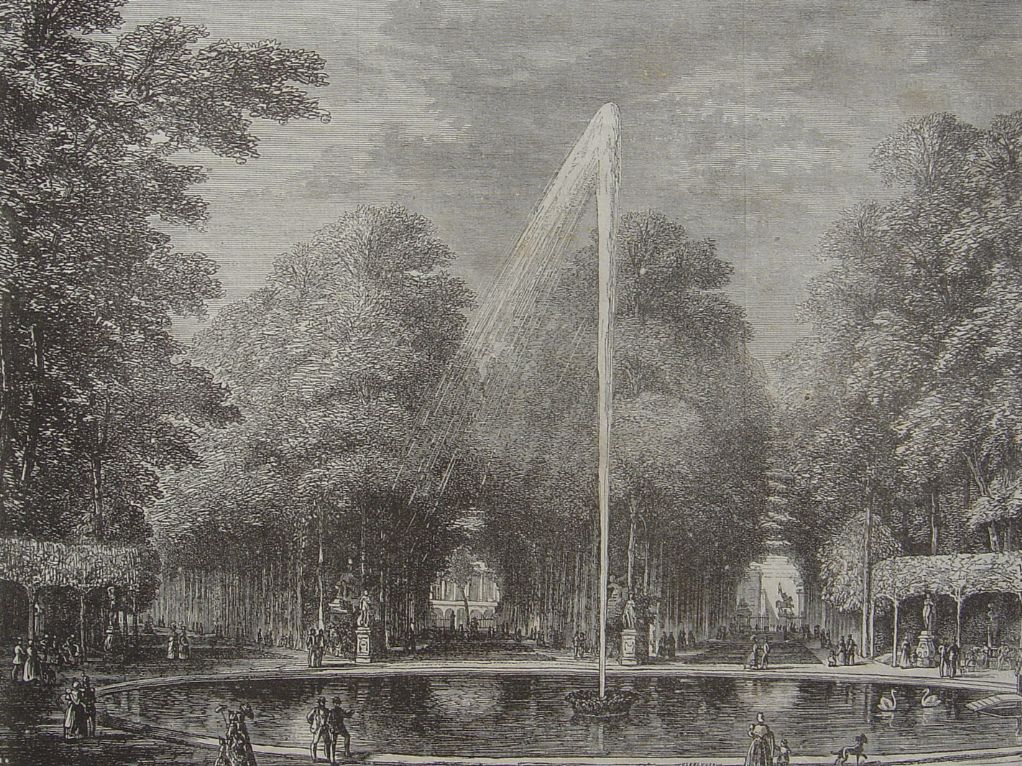
Brussels Park's fountain in 1870, etching from L'Illustration Européenne

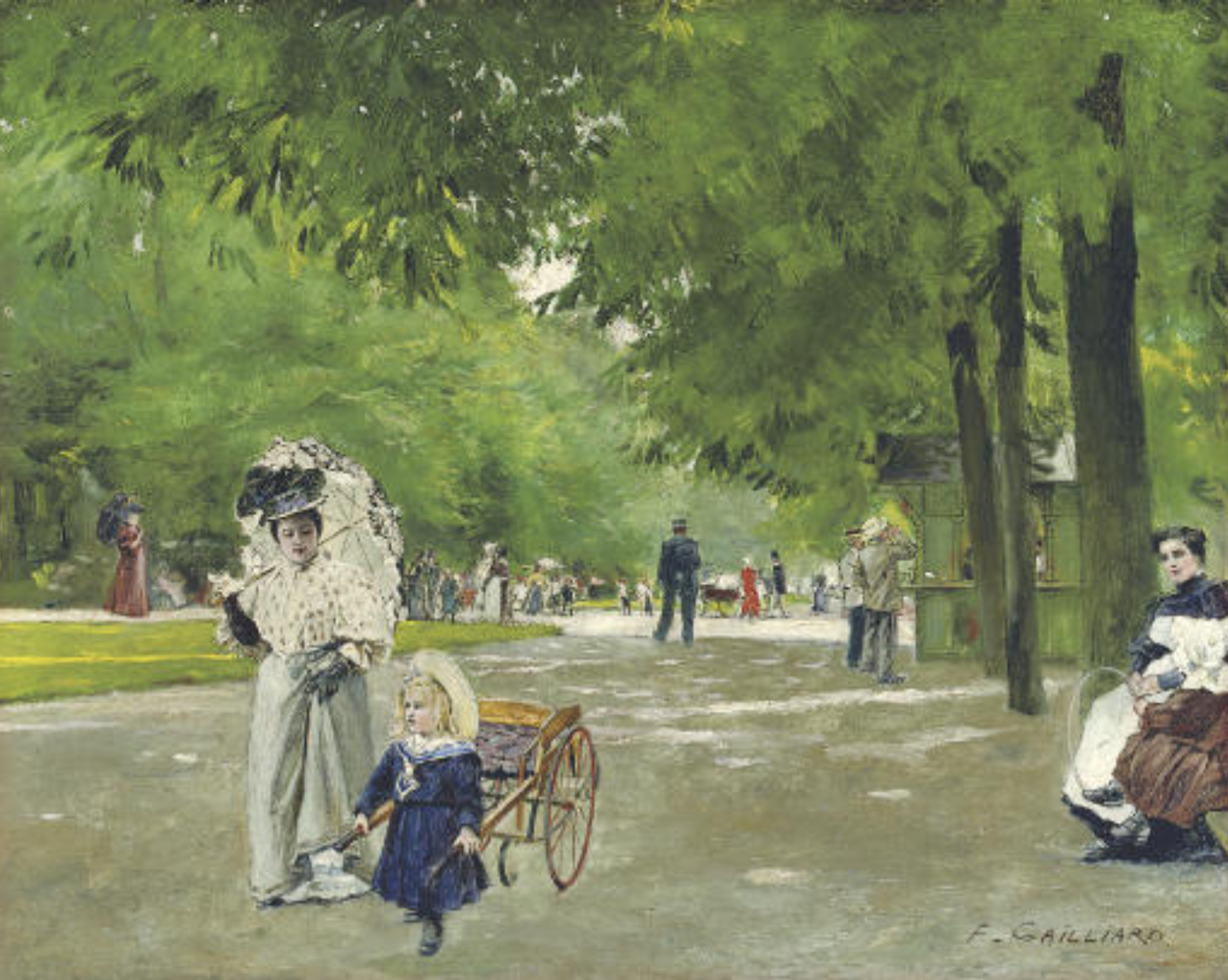
La promenade (Franz Gailliard, 1896), with the park as setting

== Buildings and monuments ==
Brussels Park is home to several public buildings and monuments:

=== Royal Park Theatre ===
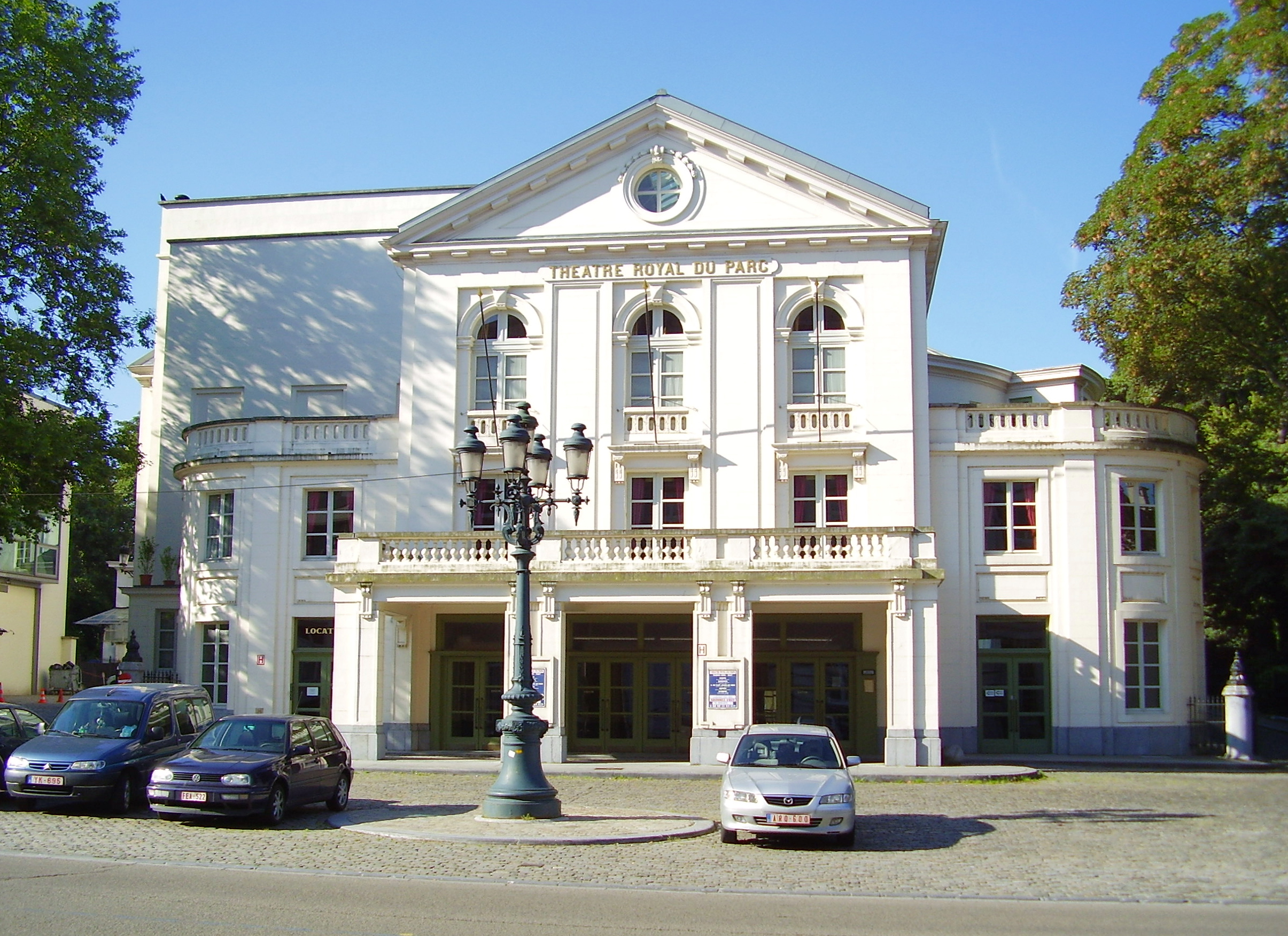
Royal Park Theatre

The Royal Park Theatre, a theatre built in 1782, is located at the park's northern end. It originally served both as a banquet hall and a literary cabinet, where newspapers and novels were made available to the public for a penny. To the chagrin of the bishopric of Mechelen, children and student actors gave various performances there: pantomimes, ballets, proverbs, burlesque comedies, as well as small operas. The institution changed vocation around 1890, moving from variety and operettas to classical theatre. In December 1998, the stage was the prey of a fire, which was quickly brought under control. This fire contained in the stage cage did not affect the room. Redesigned several times with the addition of an awning, balconies and a portico, the building underwent a major renovation in 2000.

=== Vauxhall ===
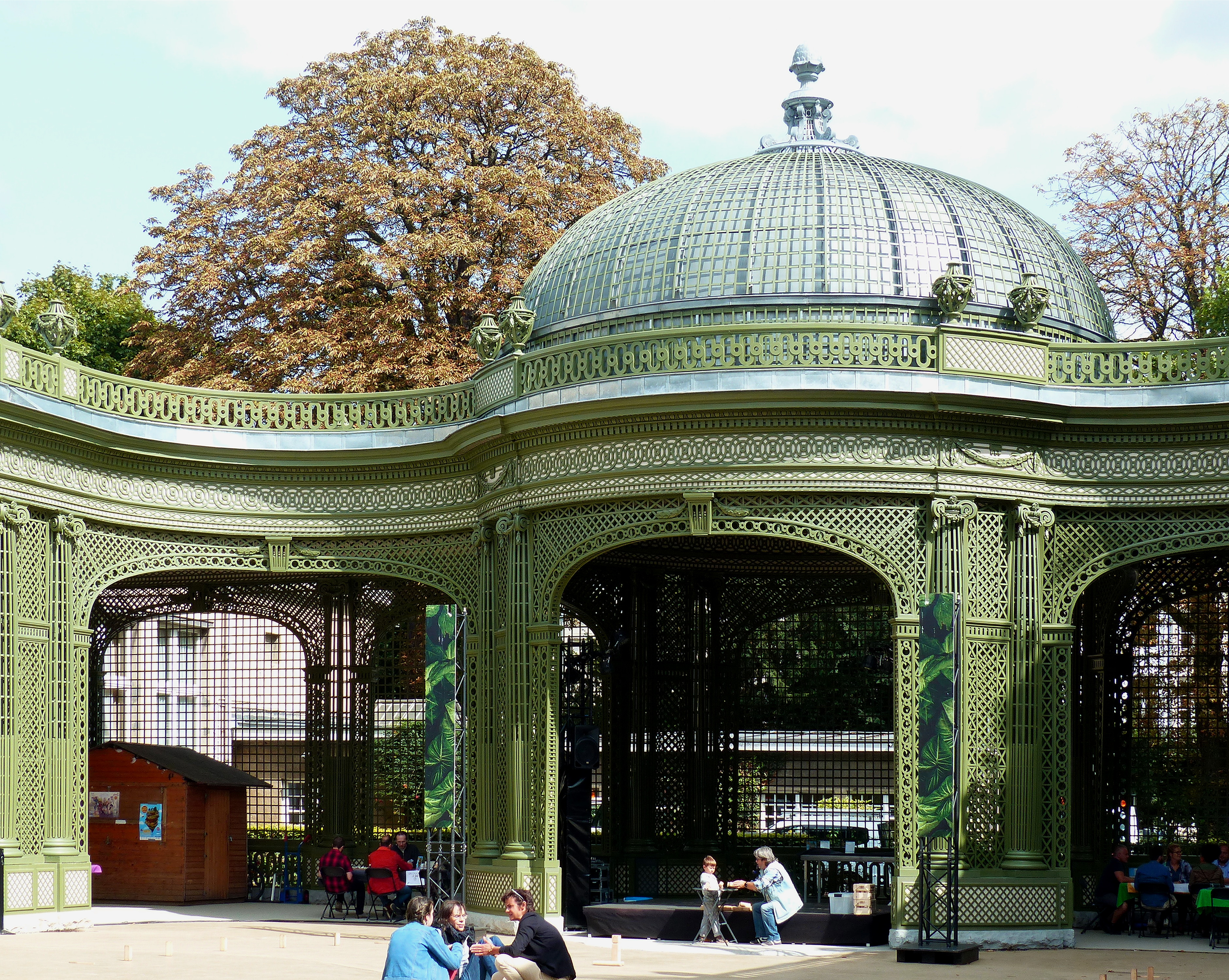
Vauxhall by François Malfait (1913)

The Vauxhall (Vaux-Hall or Waux-Hall), a historic performance hall, established in the 1780s by the Bultos family, is located behind the Park Theatre. From 1820 to 1870, its premises housed the Concert Noble, a noble society of Brussels' Music Academy. The aristocratic society organised balls and concerts there and had a new banquet hall built against the existing building by the architect Charles Vander Straeten, nowadays occupied by the exclusive French-speaking club Cercle Gaulois. The rest of the Vauxhall was extensively renovated in 1913 by the City of Brussels' architect François Malfait. Striking is the green trelliswork of the gallery, topped with a dome à l'impériale.

=== Vauxhall bandstand ===
The Vauxhall's bandstand, built in 1892, was located along the enclosure at the building's rear end. It was a refurbished bandstand in neo-Moorish style that housed the summer concerts of the Royal Theatre of La Monnaie from 1852. At the request of the City of Brussels, which was seeking to relaunch the breathless entertainment venue, the orchestra pavilion with its dome and trellises was rebuilt in 1913 by the architect Malfait. Lacking the expected success, it was abandoned ten years later. An enlightened amateur, Baron Éric d'Huart, undertook the restoration from 1987 to make it his home.

=== Bandstand ===
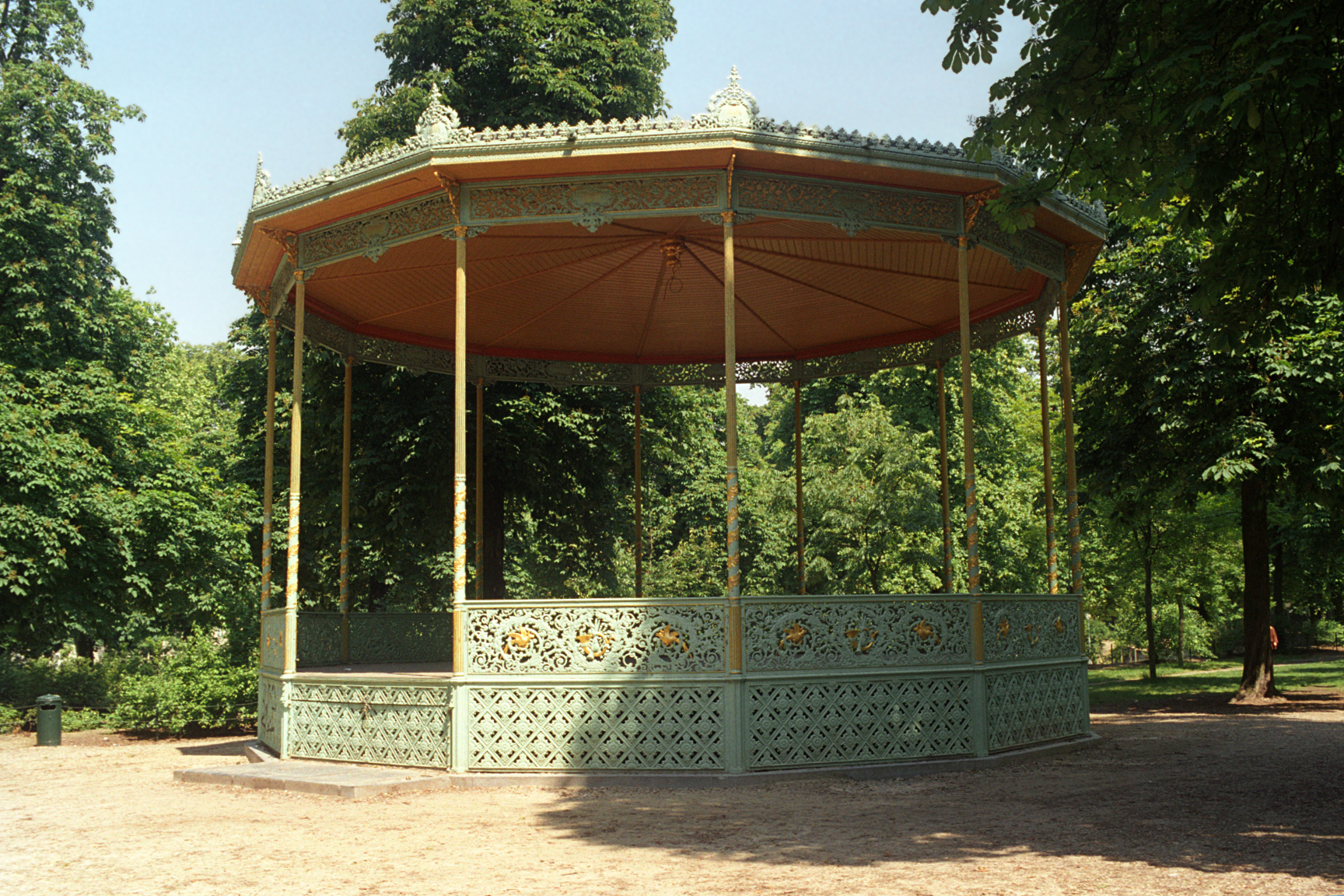
Bandstand by Jean-Pierre Cluysenaar (1841)

The park's main bandstand was built in 1841 by the Dutch architect Jean-Pierre Cluysenaar for national holiday celebrations. This ornate twelve-sided cast iron kiosk was initially intended for the roundabout in the park opposite the Palace of the Nation, but was soon moved to a higher spot within the park. For more than a century, it has been used regularly for concerts and fanfare orchestras.

=== Water basins ===
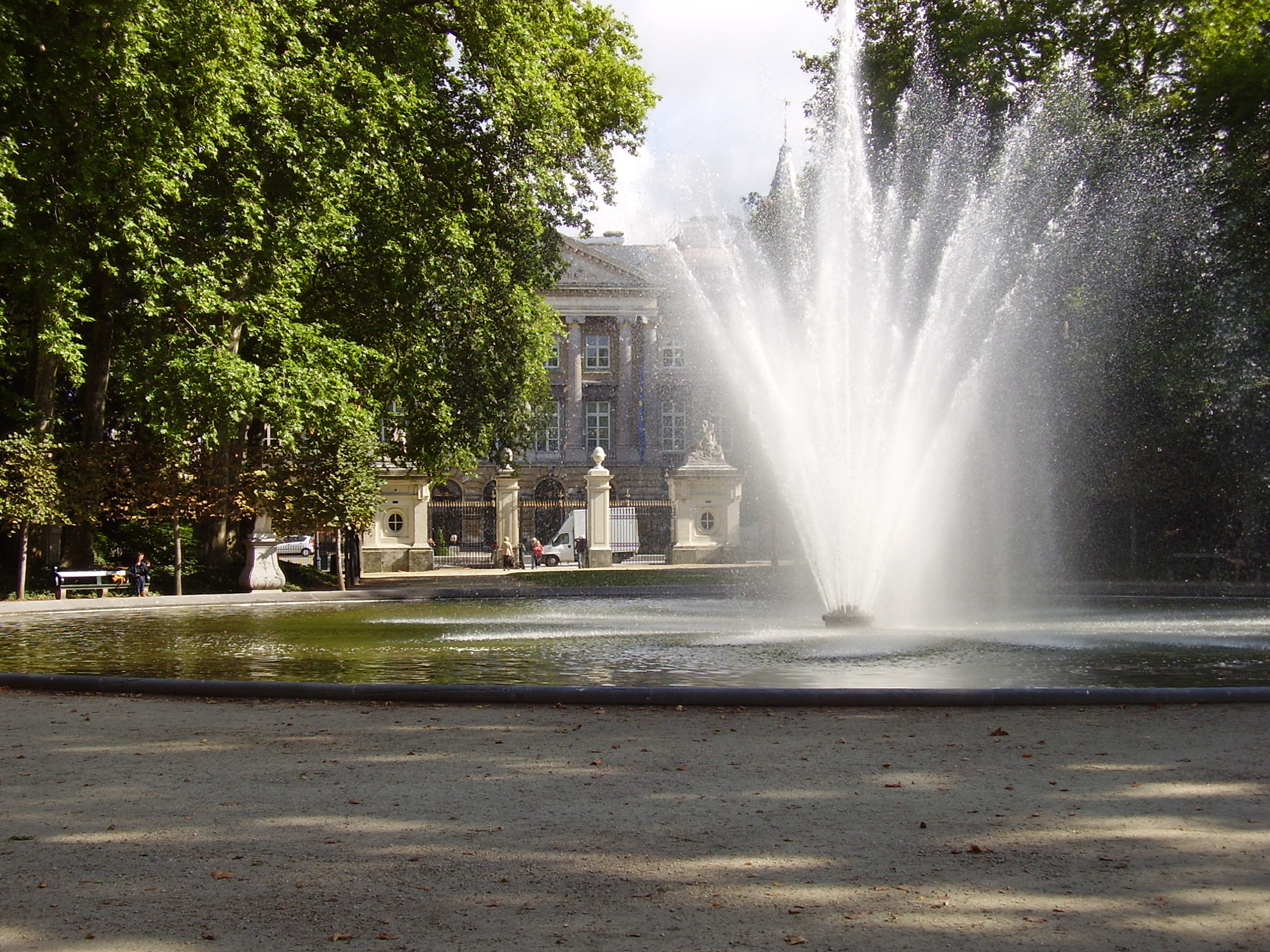
The park's main fountain with the Palace of the Nation in the background

Two water basins with fountains are located in the park: a main one, constructed in 1855, and an octagonal one, constructed in 1780, whose sides are located for one half in the extension of the paths and for the other in front of the cut sides separating the paths. The eight busts of Hermes surrounding it were formerly powered by the hydraulic machine of Saint-Josse-ten-Noode.

== Sculptures ==
Brussels Park contains around sixty sculptures, primarily inspired by Greco-Roman mythology, created by sculptors including Gabriël Grupello, Jan-Baptiste van der Haeghen, Laurent Delvaux, François-Joseph Janssens, Gilles-Lambert Godecharle, Thomas Vinçotte and Jean-Michel Folon. The oldest, for the most part, come from the park of the Castle of Tervuren from which they were moved at the time of the death of its owner, Prince Charles Alexander of Lorraine. Paying a heavy price for wars, vandalism and pollution, they have mostly been replaced by copies.

Originally, the statues were painted in grey or French stone tones. It was not until 1921 that, yielding to a fashion, a systematic stripping programme was put in place.

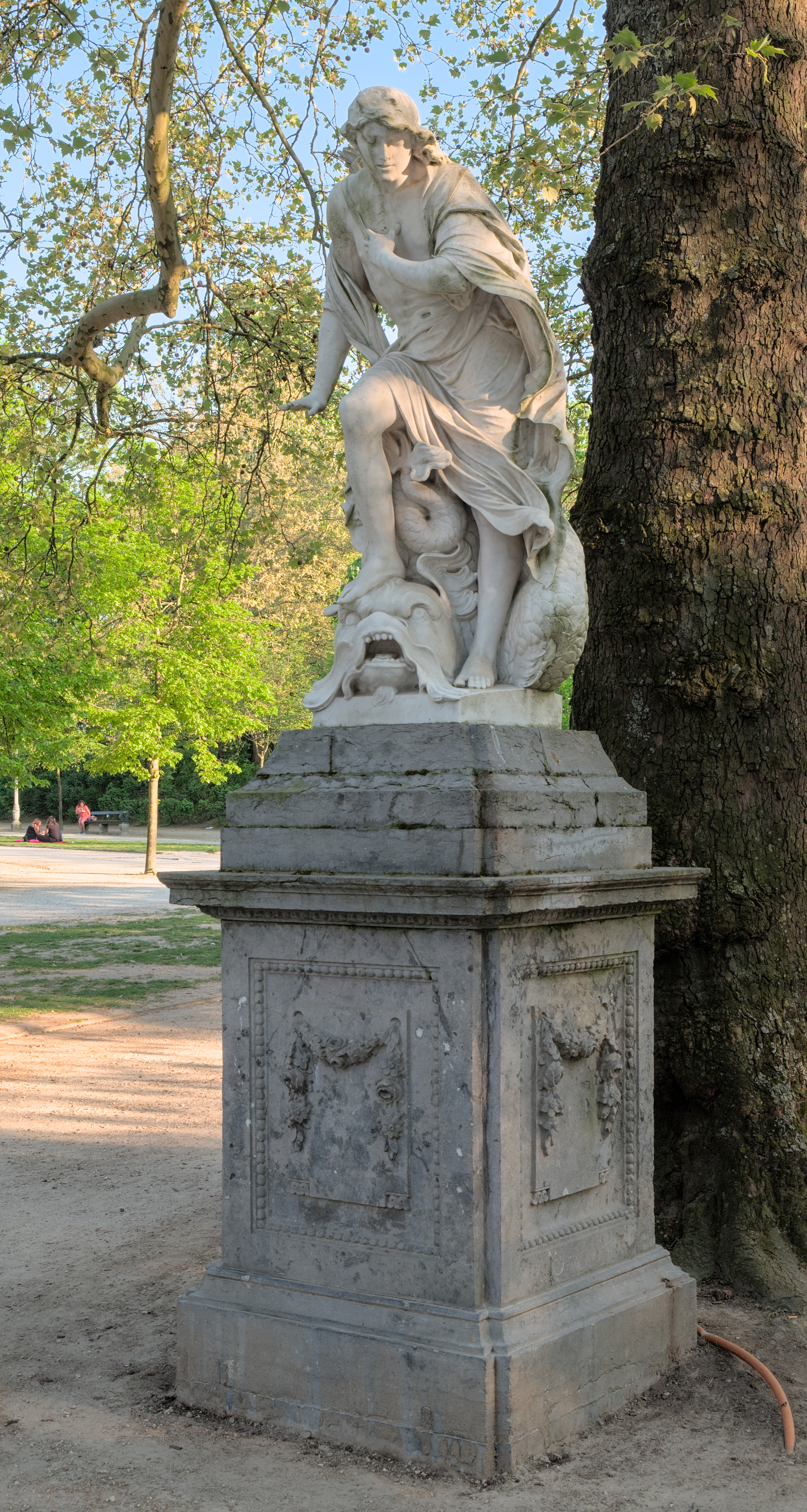
Narcissus by Albert Desenfans, original by Gabriël Grupello

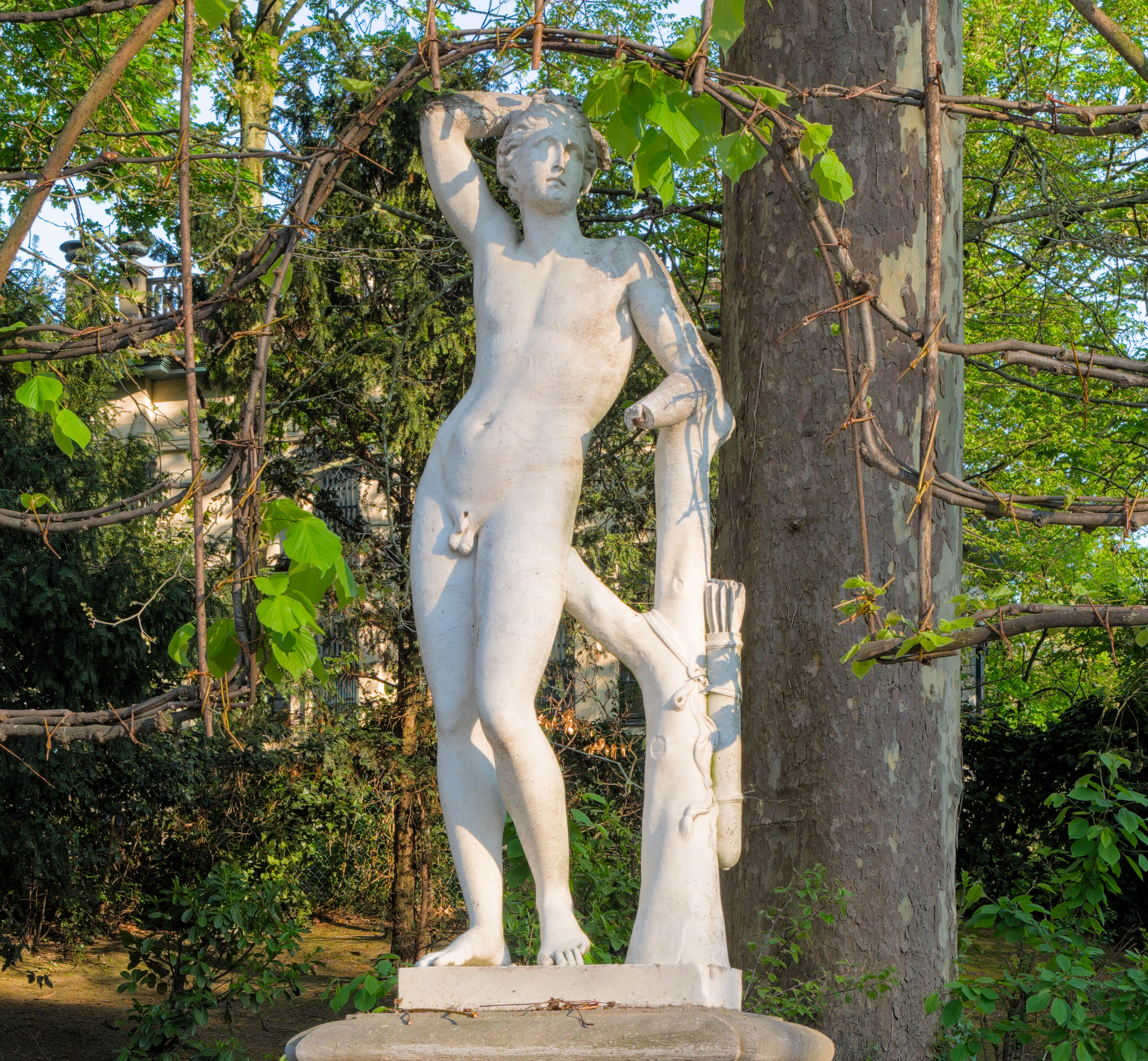
Apollo by François-Joseph Janssens

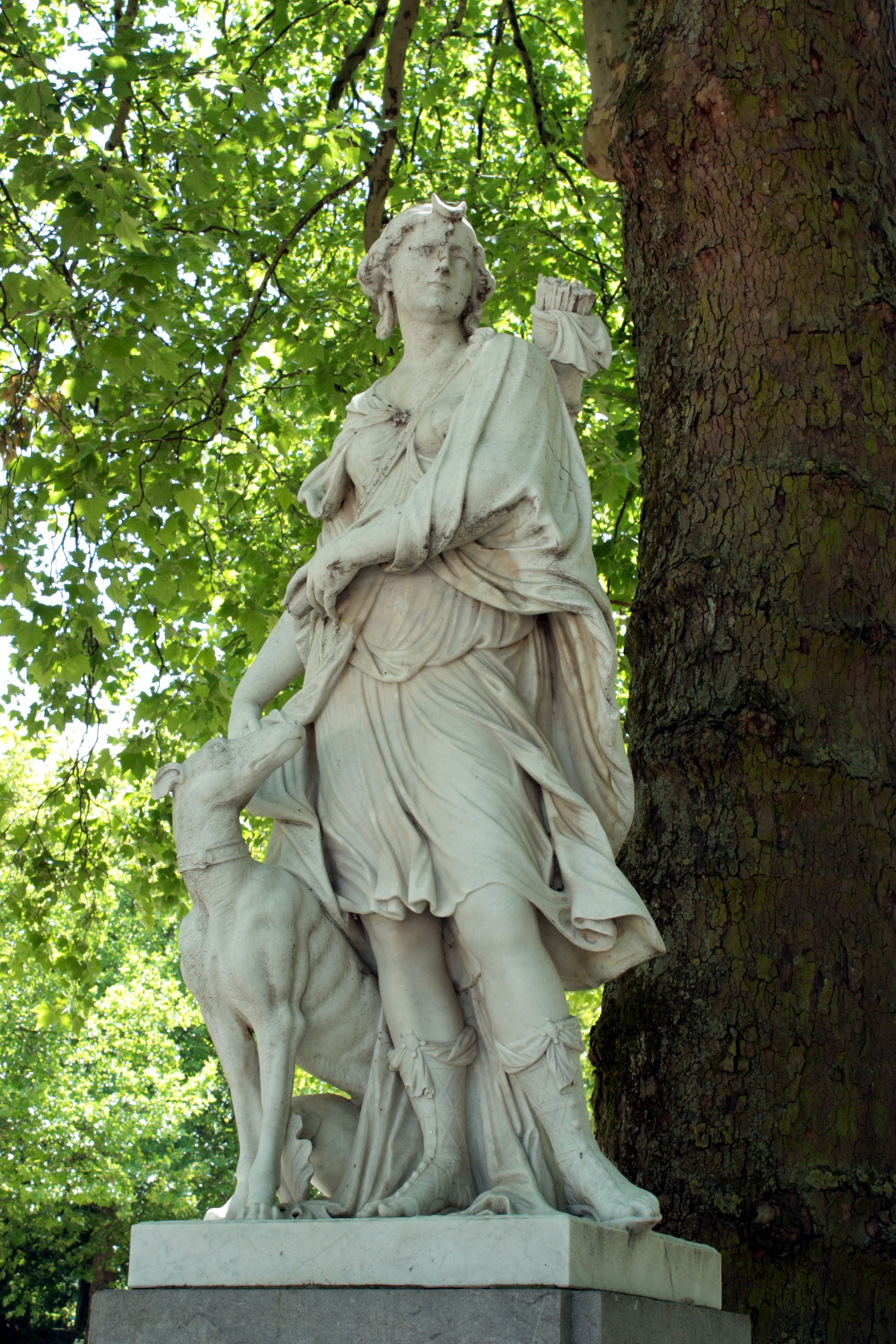
Diana by Gabriël Grupello

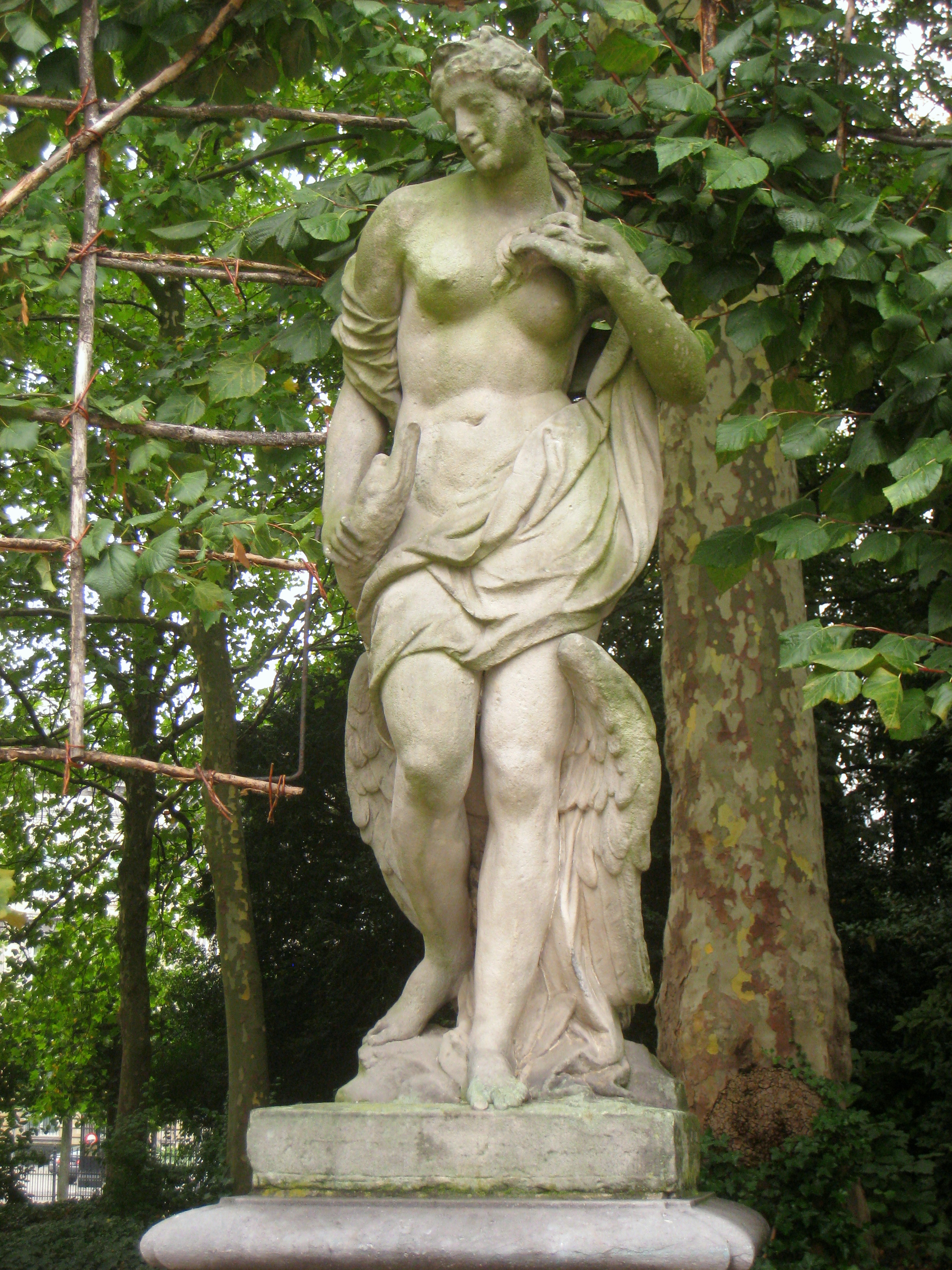
Leda by Jan-Baptiste van der Haeghen

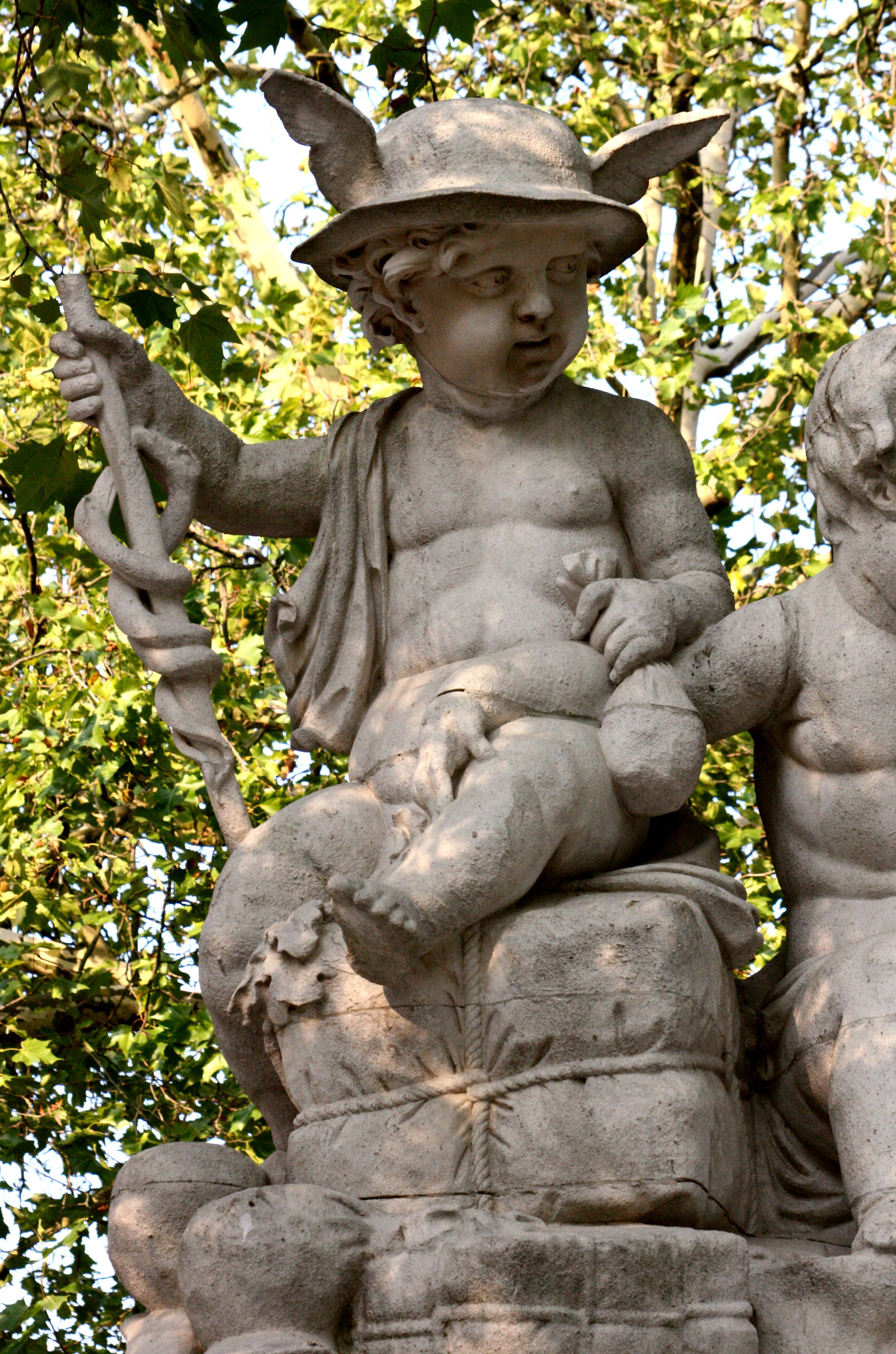
Commerce and Navigation by Gilles-Lambert Godecharle

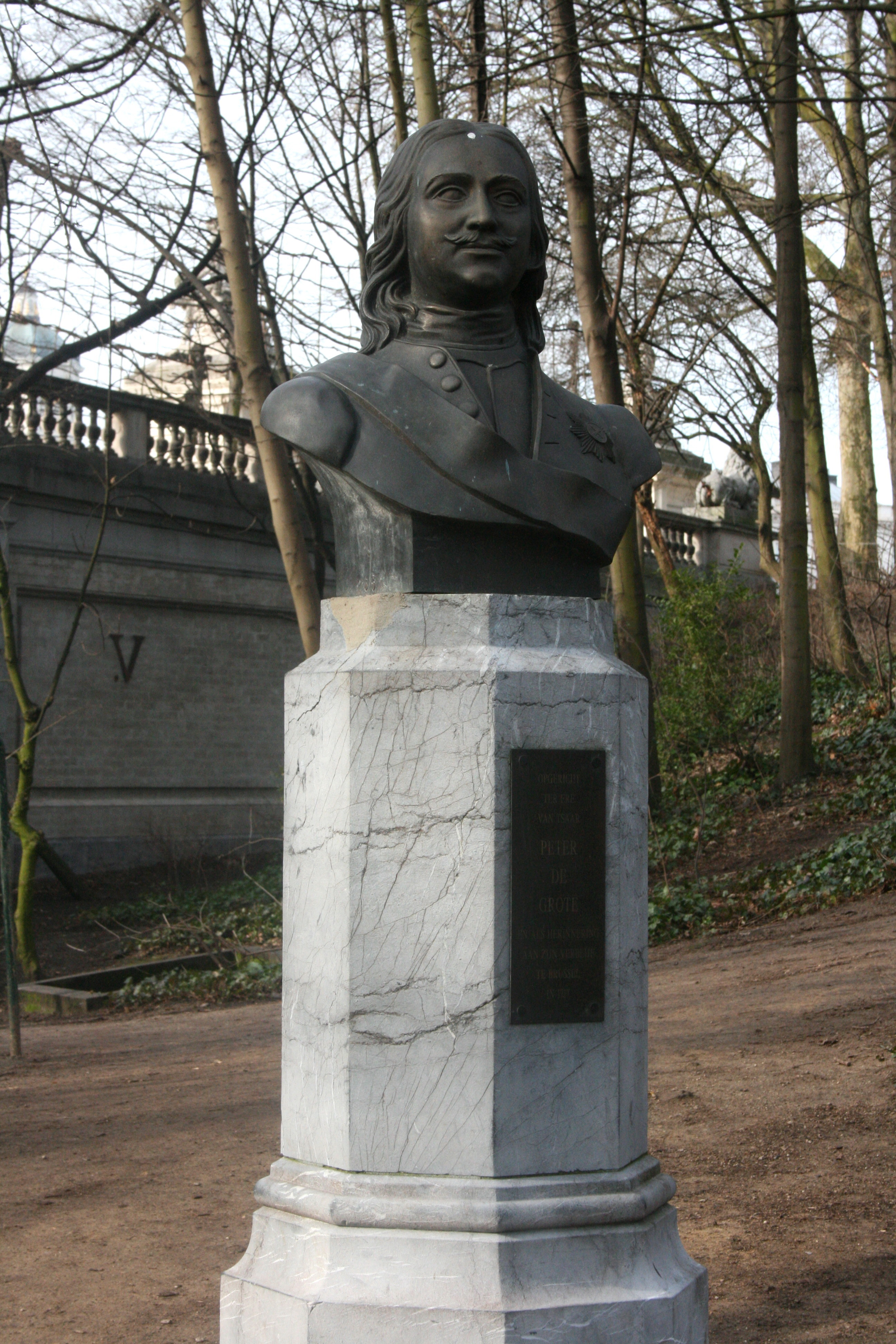
Monument to Peter the Great

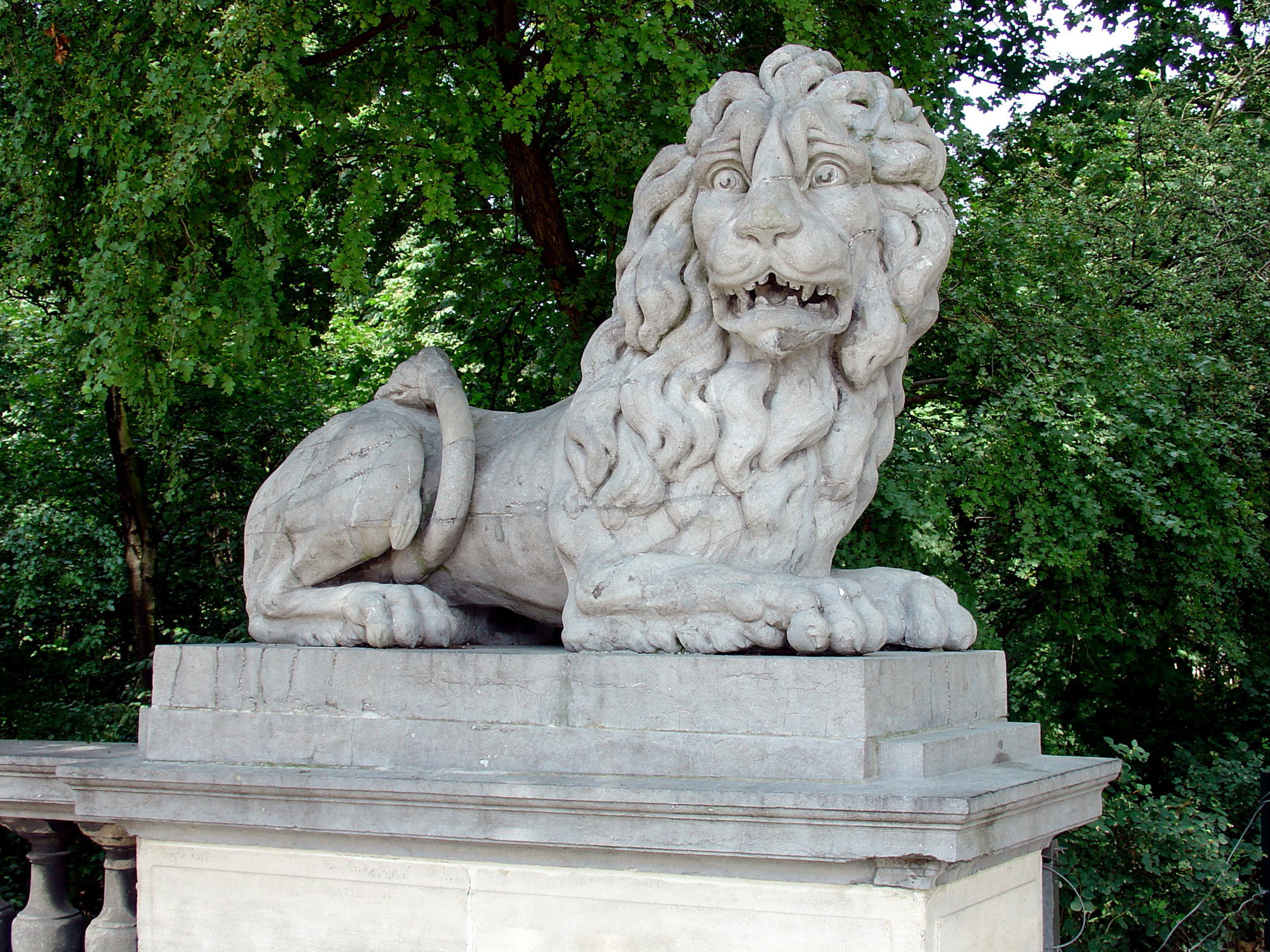
Statue of a lion at the park's entrance near the Royal Palace

== Remarkable trees ==
The park's central path is mainly lined with plane trees. As for the two paths leading to Place Royale and Place du Trône, they are respectively planted with chestnut trees and a varied mixture of high-stemmed trees (e.g. maples, beeches, plane trees, chestnut trees, etc.). The two transverse paths are adorned with elms and beeches. All around the park, there is also a double row of trellised lime trees, which reinforces the elaborate appearance of this green ensemble.

Below are some of the park's remarkable trees listed by the Monuments and Sites Commission:

English name	Latin name	cir. in cm
London plane	Platanus x hispanica	345
Horse-chestnut	Aesculus hippocastanum	325
Sycamore	Acer pseudoplatanus	304
Oriental plane	Platanus orientalis	290
European beech	Fagus sylvatica	283
European ash	Fraxinus excelsior	222
Norway maple	Acer platanoides	202
Common hackberry	Celtis occidentalis	126
Japanese zelkova	Zelkova serrata	106

== See also ==
- List of parks and gardens in Brussels
- History of Brussels
- Belgium in the long nineteenth century
