= Louis Compain =

French actor and singer

Louis Compain (14 April 1733, Toury – after 1790), also known as Compain-Despierrières, was a French actor and singer. He is notable as the co-director of the Théâtre de la Monnaie in Brussels from 1772 to 1776, where he had made his debut in 1757. He also acted in the Du Londel Troupe in Sweden, at Marseille (1759), Bordeaux (1760), The Hague (1768), Metz (1778), Toulouse (1779), Nîmes (1786) and Nantes (1790).

Preceded by D'Hannetaire and the "Comédiens associés"	director of the Théâtre de la Monnaie; 1772–1776	Succeeded by Ignaz Vitzthumb
