= Angélique D'Hannetaire =

French actress and opera singer (1749–1822)

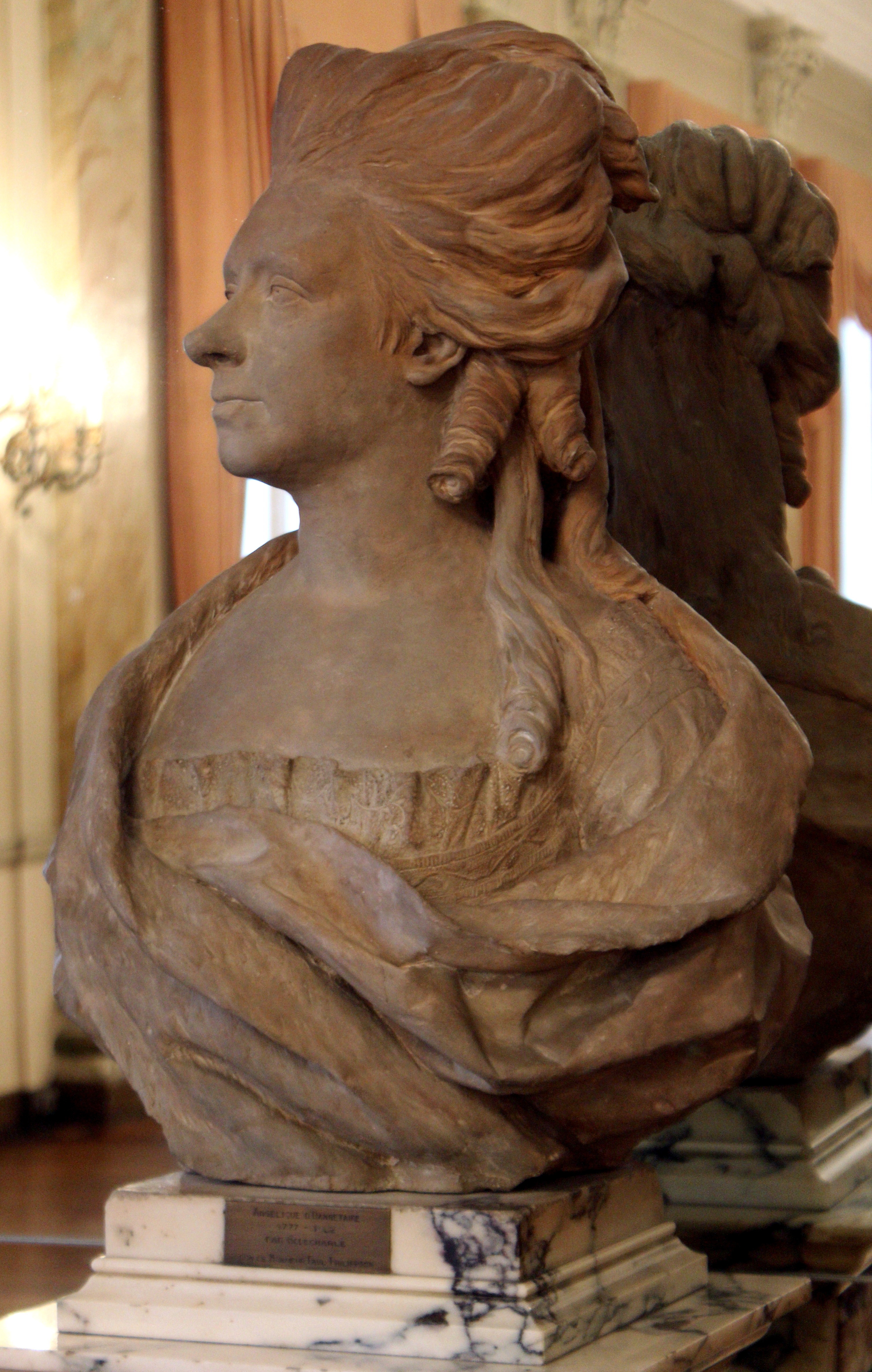
Cercle Royal Gaulois

Marie-Angélique Servandoni (22 September 1749, Toulouse – 14 April 1822, Paris), stage name Angélique D'Hannetaire, was a French actress and opera singer.

== Bibliography ==
Angélique d'Hannetaire was born on 22 September 1749 in Toulouse. She was the daughter of the actor and director D'Hannetaire and his wife, the actor Marguerite Hue.

She died on the 14 April 1822, in Paris.

== Career ==
Angélique made her debut at the Théâtre de la Monnaie aged 12 in La Servante maîtresse by Pierre Baurans, after the work by Pergolesi, beside Alexandre Bultos (like her, a student of Ignaz Vitzthumb, music-master of the Théâtre de la Monnaie). She was active at the Monnaie from 1766 until 1775. She often performed the role of heroine in romantic parts, and she also acted as a singer in opera buffa.

In 1777, she played the lead role in the comic-opera Céphalide ou les Autres Mariages samnites.

Her career ended in 1779.
