= Opéra flamand =

Former Dutch language opera and theatre in Brussels, Belgium

The Opéra flamand (French pronunciation: [ɔpeʁa flamɑ̃]; "Flemish Opera") was a Dutch language opera and theatre stage in Brussels. It is known to have been active between 1772 and 1776. It was housed in the La Monnaie theatre building in Brussels. Despite its name, it performed both theatre as well as opera.

== History ==
The opera company was effectively founded by Jacob Neyts. The opera theatre was established on the initiative of Ignaz Vitzthumb, who was engaged as the manager and director of the French language opera theatre La Monnaie in Brussels. In this period, Brussels was one of the leading theatre culture centres of Europe, but all professional theatre was performed in French. The Flemish theatre was therefore an innovation of its time. It was a success, but the initiative did not last after Ignaz Vitzthumb left the post as manager.
