= Herman Bultos =

Herman Bultos (19 August 1752 in Brussels – 30 June 1801 in Hamburg-Billwerder) was an 18th-century wine merchant and theatre director from the Austrian Netherlands.

== Life ==
The younger brother of the actor Alexandre Bultos, Herman became co-head of Brussels' Théâtre de la Monnaie in 1783, with Alexandre for 4 years, then alone from 1787 to 1791, then with Jean-Pierre-Paul Adam from 1791 to 1793 and again in 1794.

Leaving Brussels during the troubles of the 1787-90 Brabant Revolution, Bultos arrived in Hamburg with several actors from the Théâtre de la Monnaie. There they founded a francophone theatre which lasted until 1798. Bultos was then taken on at the court of prince Henry of Prussia at Rheinsberg, but only acted there for 2 years.

Preceded by Louis-Jean Pin, Alexandre Bultos and Sophie Lothaire	director of the Théâtre de la Monnaie; 1783–1793	Succeeded by Herman Bultos and Jean-Pierre-Paul Adam
Preceded by Mademoiselle Montansier	director of the Théâtre de la Monnaie; 1794	Succeeded by Jean-Joseph Galler
