= Jean-François Fieuzal =

Jean-François Fieuzal or Fieusacq (end of the 1710s - 16 February 1769, Brussels), stage name Durancy was a French actor-director and part of Charles Simon Favart’s acting troupe. He headed the Théâtre de la Monnaie in Brussels from 1 April 1752 until 15 March 1755. Afterwards, he was an actor in Bordeaux for some time. He made his debut at the Comédie-Française on 7 November 1759. Durancy married mademoiselle Darimath, with whom he conceived two daughters. The youngest of the two, Claire-Eulalie, was an actress in Brussels, while the oldest one, Céleste, acted for a long time at the Comédie-Française and the Opéra de Paris.
