= François-Antoine Chevrier =

French satirist and playwright

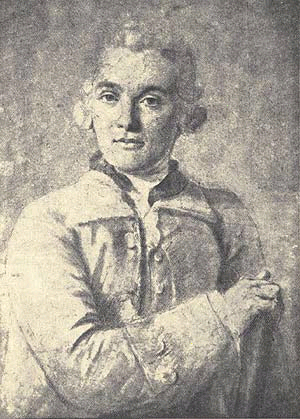
- Born: 11 October 1721; Nancy
- Died: 26 June 1762 (aged 40); Rotterdam
- Occupation: Playwright

François-Antoine (de) Chevrier (11 October 1721 – 26 June 1762) was an 18th-century French satirist and playwright. Adolphe van Bever defined him as "the most satirical and the least sociable".

== Works ==
- Pamphlets et romans
  - 1745: Recueil de ces dames, Brussels, Paris, aux dépens de la Compagnie
  - 1746: Bi-Bi, conte traduit du chinois par un Français. Première et peut-être dernière édition, à Mazuli, Khilo-Khula, l'an de Sal-Chodaï 623 [Paris]
  - 1751: Voyage de Rogliano, par M. de Chevrier, Livorno, Imprimerie française
  - 1752: Les Ridicules du siecle, London [Paris, Mérigot]
  - 1752: Ma-gakou: histoire japonnoise, A Goa [Paris], Par exprès commandement de l'empereur
  - 1752: Cela est singulier, histoire égyptienne, traduite par un rabbin génois, A Babylone, de l'Imprimerie royale [Paris], 1752
  - 1753: Mémoires d'une honnête femme écrits par elle-même et publiés par M. de Chevrier, à Londres [Paris, Mérigot ou Sébastien Jorry]
  - 1753: Le Quart d'heure d'une jolie femme, ou les Amusemens de la toilette, ouvrage presque moral dédié à Messieurs les habitans des coins du roi et de la reine, par Mademoiselle de *****, Geneva, A. Philibert, 1753
  - 1755: Observations sur le théâtre, dans lesquelles on examine avec impartialité l'état actuel des spectacles de Paris, par M. de Chevrier, Paris, Debure le jeune
  - 1761: Testament politique du maréchal duc de Belle-Isle
  - 1762: Le Codicille, et l'esprit, ou Commentaire des maximes politiques de M. le maréchal duc de Bell'Isle, avec des notes apologétiques, historiques et critiques, le tout publié par M. D. C***, the Haye, Veuve Van Duren
  - 1761: Le Colporteur, histoire morale et critique, à Londres, chez Jean Nourse, l'An de Vérité [The Hague]
  - 1762: Almanach des gens d'esprit par un homme qui n'est par sot, calendrier pour l'année 1762 et le reste de la vie, publié par l'auteur du "Colporteur", Toujours à Londres [The Hague], chez l'éternel Jean Nourse
  - 1762: Les Amusemens des dames de B***. Histoire honnête et presque édifiante, composée par feu le chevalier de Ch***** et publiée par l'auteur du "Colporteur", à Rouen, chez Pierre Le Vrai, cette présente année [The Hague]
  - 1762–1763: L'Observateur des spectacles ou Anecdotes théâtrales, ouvrage périodique, par M. de Chevrier, La Haye, l'auteur; Amsterdam, Henri Constapel, 3 vol.
- Theatre
  - 1741: Le Feint normand
  - 1746: L'Inconstant
  - 1749: Cargula
  - 1753: La Revue des théâtres
  - 1754: Le Retour du goût
  - 1754: La Campagne
  - 1755: L'Épouse suivante
  - 1755: Les Fêtes parisiennes
  - 1757: La Petite maison
- Poems
  - 1758: L'Acadiade ou Prouesses angloises en Acadie, Canada &c. Poëme comi-héroïque, en quatre chants, par Mr. D***, Cassel [Paris], aux depens de l'auteur
  - 1759: L'Albionide, ou l'Anglais démasqué, poëme héroï-comique relatif aux circonstances présentes, enrichi de notes historiques, politiques & critiques, par M. le comte de F.P.T., Aix, J. William
  - 1759: L'Hanovriade, poëme héroi-burlesque en cinq chants, orné de notes historiques, allegoriques, morales et critiques, par l'auteur du poëme de l'Albionide, Closter-Seven, George De Bergen.

== Bibliography ==
- Ad. Van Bever, Le Colporteur par François-Antoine Chevrier. Réimprimé sur l'édition publiée à Londres, en 1762, avec une préface, des notes, des documents inédits et suivi d'un supplément, Paris, Bibliothèque des Curieux, 1904.
- Raymond Trousson, "François-Antoine Chevrier. Le Colporteur. Histoire morale et critique (1761)", in Romans libertins du XVIIIe, Paris, Robert Laffont, 1993, coll. "Bouquins".
- Jean-Claude Hauc, "François-Antoine Chevrier", in Aventuriers et libertins au siècle des Lumières, Paris, Éditions de Paris, 2009.
