= D'Hannetaire =

French actor and theatre director

Jean-Nicolas Servandoni, stage name D'Hannetaire, (3 November 1718 - 1 January 1780) was a French actor and theatre director.

== Life ==
He was born in Grenoble, the son of the Florentine painter Giovanni Niccolò Servandoni (also known as Jean-Nicolas Servandoni) and his wife Marie-Josèphe Gravier, known for his façade for the église Saint-Sulpice in Paris. D'Hannetaire seems to have begun his acting career in Germany, around 1740. He played at the château d'Arolsen, for the prince of Waldeck, around 1743 and was in Aix-la-Chapelle in 1744, from whence he arrived in Liège around the end of the year. In November he presented a Divertissement nouveau de chants et de danses for prince-bishop Jean-Théodore of Bavaria and, also whilst in Liège, married the comic-actor Marguerite-Antoinette Huet (stage name Mademoiselle Danicourt) on 17 February 1745. The couple arrived in Brussels in October 1745 and D'Hannetaire took up leadership of the Théâtre de la Monnaie, from which he was dislodged four months later by Favart. He and his wife integrated into the troupe of maréchal de Saxe and he once again took direction of the theatre on the departures of the French troupes at the end of 1748.

He then played at Toulouse and Bordeaux, then made his debut at the Comédie-Française on 27 April 1752 in the rôle of Orgon in Tartuffe. However, he preferred to return to Brussels, in Durancy's troupe, in which he was entrusted "les rôles à manteaux" and "les rôles de Crispin". In 1755 he took over from Durancy as head of this troupe, and stayed so until 1771, sometimes alone, sometimes in association with other actors.

D'Hannetaire and his wife had 8 children, 2 of whom also became notable actors :

- Eugénie (1746–1816), married the comic-actor Larive, it was to her that the prince de Ligne dedicated his Lettres à Eugénie sur les spectacles (1774)
- Angélique (1749–1822), mistress of vicomte Desandrouins, then of the same prince de Ligne.

In 1768, he renounced acting to become a notary, in the historic context of the excommunication of actors "in virtue of an old usage of comedy". Nevertheless, he continued to act at Brussels for several years, before having to retire until his death in Brussels.

== Works ==
- Observations sur l'Art du Comédien, et sur d'autres objets concernant cette Profession en général, known in 8 editions, at first anonymous, then under the pseudonym Dhannetaire (1772, 1774, 1775, 1776, 1778 and 1800).

== Sources ==
- (in French) Henri Liebrecht, Comédiens français d'autrefois à Bruxelles, Paris, Bruxelles, Labor, 1932. See chapter II, "Un comédien grand seigneur : Jean Nicolas Servandoni D'Hannetaire, seigneur d'Haeren".
- (in French) Carlo Bronne, Financiers et comédiens au XVIIIe siècle, Ed. Goemaere, Bruxelles, 1969.
