= List of directors of La Monnaie =

This is a list of directors and ballet masters of the Royal Theatre of La Monnaie in Brussels, Belgium.

Years	Directors	Ballet masters	Composition of the companies (seasons)
1700	Gio Paolo Bombarda	Pierre Deschars	
1702	Domenico Lorenzoni and Giuseppe Contri		
1704	Gio Paolo Bombarda		
1705	Jean Barrier, stage name Fonpré	?	1705–1706
1706	Joseph de Pestel	Pierre Dubreuil ?	
1708	Francesco-Paolo D'Angelis		
1710	Jean-Baptiste Grimberghs	?	
1715	Jacques Vigoureux Duplessis		1715
1716	Bruno-Emmanuel de Beaulieu		
1721	Louise Dimanche		
1722	Thomas-Louis Bourgeois	Reymond	
1724	Marianne Dujardin	?	1724 — 1725
1727	Antonio Maria Peruzzi		
1728	Joachim Landi		
1730	Jean-Richard Le Roux, dit Durant		
1731	Joseph Bruseau de La Roche		
1733	François Moylin, stage name Francisque		
1734	Nicolas Huau		
1736	Pierre-Antoine Gourgaud, stage name Dugazon		
1738	Louis Desjardins, stage name Beaupré / François-Hyacinthe Ribon		
1740	Pierre-Jacques Ribou de Ricard		
1743	Joseph Uriot / Charles Plante and Jeanne Belhomme		
1744	Jean-Baptiste Grimaldi, stage name Nicolini		
1745	Jean-Nicolas Servandoni, stage name D'Hannetaire		
1746	Charles-Simon Favart	Billioni	1746–1748
1749	Jean-Benoît Leclair / Giovanni Francesco Crosa / Hus frères		
1750	Duc d'Arenberg, duc d'Ursel and marquis de Deynze		
1752	Jean-François Fieuzal, stage name Durancy	François La Comme / Julien / Lemaire	1753–1754 — 1754–1755
1755	Jean-Nicolas Servandoni, stage name D'Hannetaire	Louis Devisse / Jean-Claude Lescot / Jean-Baptiste Pitrot	
1759	Léopold-Ignace Gourville	Joubert / Felicini / Jean-Baptiste Hus	1761–1762 — 1762–1763
1763	Charliers de Borchgravenbroeck, Pierre Gamond and Van Maldere	Charles Bernardy / Billioni	1766–1767
1767	D'Hannetaire and the "Comédiens associés"	Saint-Léger	1767–1768
1772	Ignaz Vitzthumb and Louis Compain	Laurent Bocquet	1772–1773 — 1773–1774 — 1774–1775 — 1775–1776
1776	Ignaz Vitzthumb	Auguste Fisse	1776–1777
1777	Louis-Jean Pin, Alexandre Bultos and Sophie Lothaire	Auguste Fisse / Louis Baland / Pierre-Jean Gambu	1779–1780 — 1780–1781 — 1781–1782 — 1782–1783
1783	Alexandre and Herman Bultos	Jean Malter, stage name Hamoir / Devos / Le Fèvre	1783–1784 — 1784–1785 — 1785–1786 — 1786–1787
1787	Herman Bultos	Jacques-Philippe Ledet	1787–1788 — 1789–1790
1791	Herman Bultos and Jean-Pierre-Paul Adam		1791–1792 — 1792–1793
1793	Marguerite Brunet, stage name Mlle Montansier	(no ballet)	
1794	Herman Bultos & Jean-Pierre-Paul Adam	(no ballet)	
1796	Jean-Joseph Galler	(no ballet)	
1798	Marc d'Oberny & J.-F. Cussy dit Champmêlé	(no ballet)	
1799	Louis-François Ribié	(no ballet)	
1801	Joseph-Auguste Dubus	(no ballet)	1801–1802 — 1802–1803 — 1803–1804 — 1804–1805 — 1805–1806 — 1806–1807 — 1807–1808 — 1808–1809 — 1809–1810 — 1810–1811
1811	Gilles-Jean-Benoît Lecatte, stage name Folleville	(no ballet)	
1815	Pierre-Louis Stapleton, stage name Eugène Hus	Eugène Hus	
1816	Joseph-Auguste Dubus	Eugène Hus / Jean-Louis Oudart	
1818	Jean-Baptiste-Sauveur Gavaudan		
1819	Claude Wolf, called Bernard	Jean-Antoine Petipa	
1823	Joseph Langle		
1831	Charles Laffillé	Victor Bartholomin	
1833	Claude-Charles Cartigny		
1835	Bernard-Léon jeune, stage name Bernard	Pierre-Joseph Degreef / Pierre-Jean Aniel	
1838	Pierre Lemoigne	Albert	
1840	Charles-Louis-Joseph Hanssens, Louis Jansenne, Charles Guillemin & Louis Van Caneghem	Pierre-Joseph Degreef / Jean-Antoine Petipa / Antoine Appiani	
1847	Auguste Nourrit	Hippolyte Barrez	
1848	Édouard Duprez & Eugène Massol	Adrien-Julien Renoux, stage name Adrien	
1849	Adolphe Grognier, stage name Jean-Baptiste Quélus	Henri Desplaces	
1850	Charles-Louis Hanssens		
1852	Théodore-C.-A. Bauduin, stage name Letellier	Victor Bartholomin / Adrien	
1858	Adolphe Grognier, stage name Jean-Baptiste Quélus	Henri Desplaces	
1861	Théodore-C.-A. Bauduin, stage name Letellier	Henri Justamant / Hippolyte Monplaisir / Adolphe Vincent / Joseph Mazilier / Alfred Lamy	
1869	Jules-Henry Vachot	Pierre Hus / Eugène Chapuis / Joseph Hansen	
1872	François-Hippolyte Avrillon	Lucien Petipa	
1873	Auguste Deloche, stage name Campocasso	Joseph Hansen	
1875	Oscar Stoumon & Édouard-Fortuné Calabresi	Alfred Lamy / Joseph Hansen / Oscar Poigny	
1885	Camille-Henry-Joseph Verdhurdt	Joseph Hansen	
1886	Joseph Dupont & Alexandre Lapissida	Gaetano Saracco	
1889	Oscar Stoumon & Édouard-Fortuné Calabresi	Lafont	1889–1900
1900	Maurice Kufferath & Guillaume Guidé	Gaetano Saracco / François Ambrosiny	1900-1901—1901-1902' — 1902-1903 — 1903-1904 — 1904-1905 — 1905-1906 — 1906-1907 — 1907-1908 — 1908-1909 — 1909-1910 — 1910-1911 — 1911-1912 — 1912-1913 — 1913-1914
1920	Maurice Corneil de Thoran, Jean Van Glabbeke & Paul Spaak		
1943	Maurice Corneil de Thoran	Marthe Coeck	
1953	Joseph Rogatchewsky	Nicolas Zverev / Jean-Jacques Etchevery	
1959	Maurice Huisman	Paul Goubé / (Maurice Béjart)	

After 1981, La Monnaie ceased to have Ballet masters, but took on choreographers in residence.

Years	Directors	Choreographers in residence
1981	Gérard Mortier	Maurice Béjart / Mark Morris
1992	Bernard Foccroulle	Anne Teresa De Keersmaeker

After 2007, La Monnaie ceased to take on choreographers in residence. Yet, Rosas and Anne Teresa De Keersmaeker continue to occupy an important part of La Monnaie's dance programme.

Years	Directors
2007	Peter de Caluwe
2025	Christina Scheppelmann
