= Carlotta Brianza =

Italian ballerina

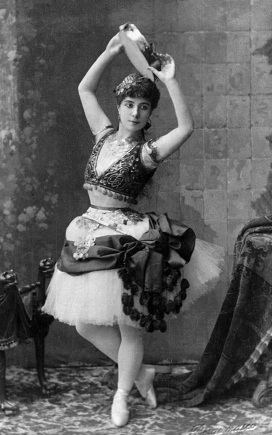
Carlotta Brianza as Esmeralda (c. 1890)

Carolina Alice Brianza, who went by the name Carlotta Brianza (1 April 1865 – 25 June 1938), was an Italian prima ballerina, dancing with La Scala in Milan and later with the Mariinsky Theatre in Saint Petersburg.

== Biography ==
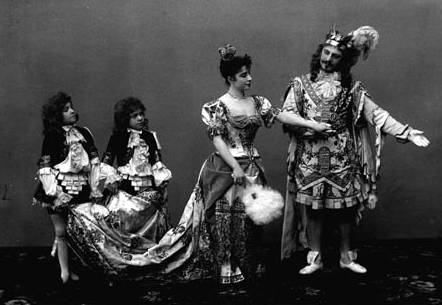
Carlotta Brianza and Pavel Gerdt as Princess Aurora and Prince Désiré in the 1890 première of the Sleeping Beauty.

Carolina Alice Brianza was born in Milan to Agostino Brianza and Elena Rivolta.

Brianza studied at the ballet school of La Scala under Carlo Blasis. She went on to dance as the company's prima ballerina in Luigi Manzotti's Excelsior. She toured the United States with the ballet in 1883 and danced it in Saint Petersburg in 1887. Thanks to her popularity there, in 1889 she was hired by the Mariinsky Theatre where she danced with Enrico Cecchetti in Lev Ivanov's The Tulip of Haarlem in 1889. On 15 January 1890, she danced Aurora in the premiere of Marius Petipa's Sleeping Beauty. She continued her dancing career in Vienna, Italy, Paris and London before returning to Paris where she taught until she retired. On 7 May 1902, in Saint-Josse-ten-Noode, she married Léon Maron (full name: Léon Jean Baptiste Marie Maron; born 10 October 1869 in Lyon). A judgment of divorce was rendered on 26 October 1921 by the Tribunal civil de la Seine. In November 1921, Sergei Diaghilev brought her out of retirement to dance (as the 'bad fairy', Carabosse) in The Sleeping Beauty in London with the Ballets Russes. In June 1922, she appears on the programme of a performance of The Good-Humoured Ladies by the Ballets Russes at Théâtre Mogador.

She died at Clichy on 25 June 1938. At the time of her death, she resided at 39 avenue Flachat in Asnières-sur-Seine (which was simply called "Asnières").

== Notable performances ==
Among Brianza's notable appearances are:

- c. 1883: debut in Luigi Manzotti's Excelsior at La Scala, Milan
- 1883: one of five Star Premiere Danseuses in the Kiralfy Brothers Excelsior in New York
- 1887: as the Spirit of Light in Luigi Manzotti's Excelsior, Arcadia Theatre, Saint Petersburg
- 1890: as Aurora in The Sleeping Beauty
- 1892: as Sylvia in Sylvia, Arcadia Theatre, St Petersburg
- 1895: Sylvia, La Scala
- 1896: Aurora in The Sleeping Beauty, staged by Giorgio Saracco, La Scala
- 1921: Carabosse in the Ballets Russes production of The Sleeping Beauty, London

== See also ==
- Women in dance
