= Pitrot =

Pitrot is the name of two generations of French dancers:

- Barthélemy Pitrot (1696–1752) French actor, dancer, and father of ...
- Antoine-Bonaventure Pitrot (1727–1792) Pitrot aîné, French dancer, choreographer and ballet master; and older brother of ...
- Jean-Baptiste Pitrot (1729–1809) Pitrot cadet French dancer and balletmaster.
