= Roucourt =

Roucourt can refer to:

- Jean-Baptiste Roucourt, music teacher, singer, and composer
- Joannes Roucourt, Christian theologian and priest
- Roucourt, Nord, a place in the Nord-Pas de Calais Region of France
- Roucourt, Hainaut, a place in the Hainaut Province of Belgium
