= Maurin de Pompigny =

French playwright

- Born: 1766
- Died: 1828 (aged 61–62)
- Occupations: Dramaturge, playwright

Maurin de Pompigny (1766 – 1828) was an 18th–19th-century French dramaturge and playwright.

De Pompigny was a dramaturge at the Théâtre de l'Ambigu-Comique, then located at 74-76 boulevard du Temple in Paris.

== Theatre ==
- 1778:Le Nœud d'amour, comédie en un acte et en prose, Paris, Variétés-Amusantes, 3 octobre 1778
- 1781:La Fête des lys, one-act divertissement, préceded by La Réunion de l'hymen et de l'amour, prologue, Besançon, 22 November
- 1783:Il y a du remède à tout, ou le Bon parent, comédie-proverbe in one act, 7 July
- 1783:Les Ombres anciennes et modernes, ou les Champs-Élysées, comédie épisodique in one act and in verse, Variétés-Amusantes, 9 September Text online
- 1783: La Ruse inutile, comedy in one act and in prose, Variétés-Amusantes, 28 October
- 1784: Le Bon valet, ou Il était temps, comédie-proverbe in one act and in prose, Variétés-Amusantes, 29 June
- 1784: Le Ramoneur prince et le Prince ramoneur, comédie-proverbe in one act, in prose, with de Beaunoir, Variétés-Amusantes, 11 December
- 1785: Mieux fait douceur que violence, ou le Père comme il y en a peu, Variétés-Amusantes, two-act comedy, 25 February
- 1785: Barogo, ou la Suite du Ramoneur prince, comedy in two acts and in prose, Variétés-Amusantes, 24 July Text online
- 1786: L'Amour et la Raison, comedy in one act and in prose, Variétés-Amusantes, 7 March [unprinted]
- 1787: L'Artisan philosophe, ou l'École des pères, one-act comedy, in prose, Ambigu-Comique, 17 December
- 1787: Bayard, ou le Chevalier sans peur et sans reproche, comédie héroïque in three acts and in verse, with show and pantomime, Ambigu-Comique, 13 October
- 1789: L'Héritage, ou l'Épreuve raisonnable, comédie-proverbe in one act, Ambigu-Comique, 8 July
- 1789: La Bonne Sœur, ou Elle en avait besoin, Ambigu-Comique, 17 December [nonprinted]
- 1790: Comminges, ou les Amans malheureux, pantomime in one act, Ambigu-Comique 1 July
- 1794: L'Époux républicain, drame patriotique in two acts and in prose, Cité-Variétés, 8 February Text online
- 1794: Le Prélat d'autrefois, ou Sophie et Saint-Elme, fait historique mis en action, comedy in three acts and in prose, with Olympe de Gouges, Cité-Variétés, 18 March
- 1795: Le Franc Marin, ou la Gageure indiscrète, two-act comedy mingled with arriettes, Théâtre lyrique des Amis de la patrie, 4 December
- 1796: Pontignac, ou À femme adroite, homme rusé, two-act comedy, in prose, Théâtre d'Émulation, 25 December
- 1798: Le Paganisme, ou Carite ou Sophronime, four-act mythological drama, with P. Besnard
- 1804: La Lampe merveilleuse, three-act melodrama féerie, extravaganza, from the One thousand nights, with Louis-François Ribié, Théâtre de la Gaîté
- 1806: La Femme médecin, ou la Porte secrète, one-act comedy in prose, with P. Besnard, Gaîté, 10 June
- 1806: Hortense de Vaucluse, three-act melodrama, extravaganza, Ambigu-Comique, 16 July Text online
- 1806: Le Sac d'argent, comédie-folie in one act, in prose, Théâtre du Marais, October
- 1807: Adrienne de Courtenai, ou le Monastère des bois, three-act melodrama, Ambigu-Comique, February Text online
- 1809: La Bête du Gévaudan, three-act melodrama in prose and extravaganza, Ambigu-Comique, 25 July Text online
- 1809: Le Refus par amour, one-act comedy in prose, Ambigu-Comique, 5 August
- 1811: Le Mystère, ou les Deux frères rivaux, three-act melodrama in prose, Ambigu-Comique, 8 January Text online
- 1812: La Princesse de Jérusalem, ou le Juif reconnaissant, three-act melodrama extravaganza, Ambigu-Comique, January
- 1813: Le Faux mariage, ou Clémentine et Montaigu, three-act melodrama extravaganza, Ambigu-Comique, 25 August Text online
