= Alexandre Artôt =

Belgian violinist (1815–1845)

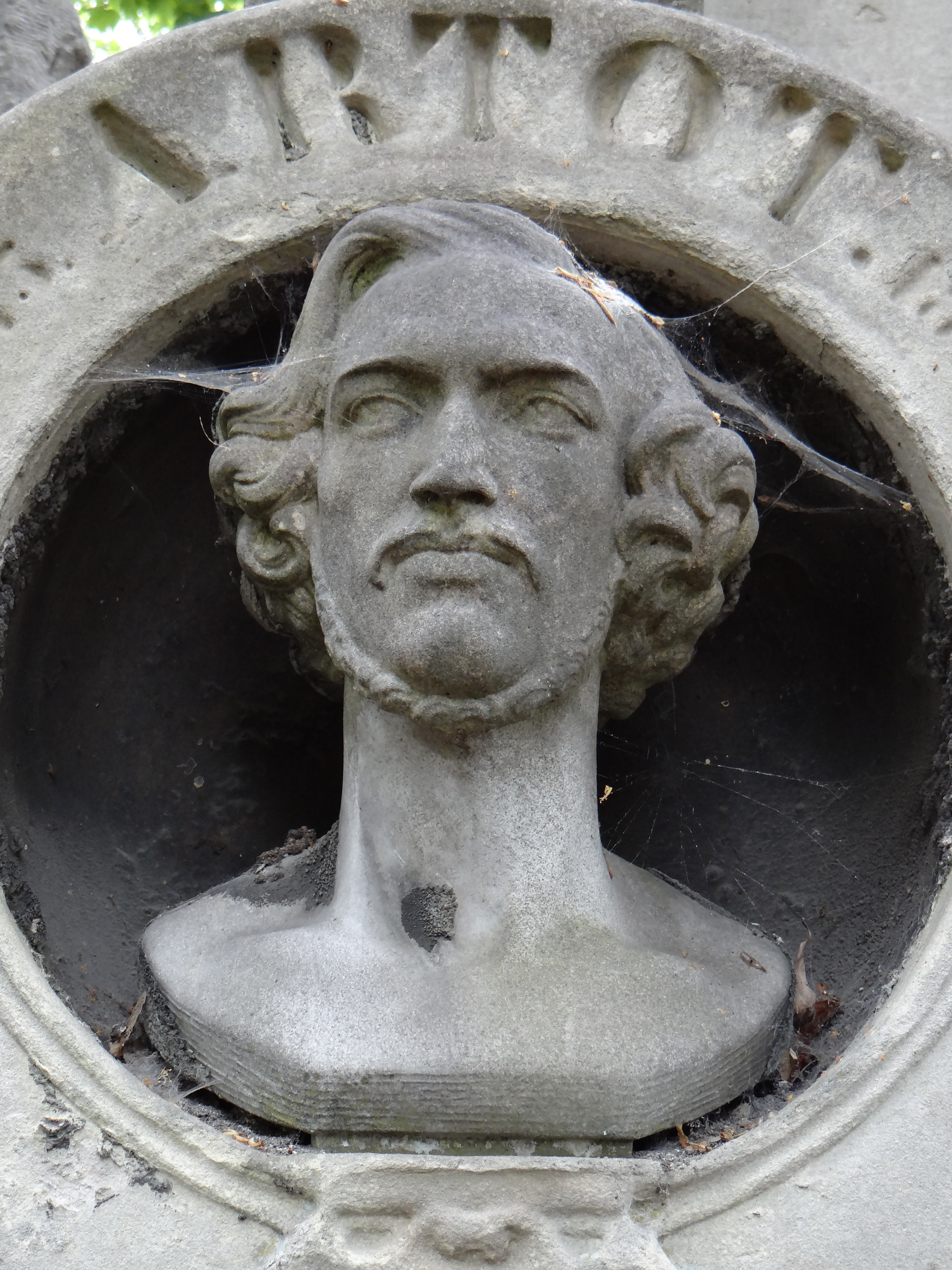
Tomb of Alexandre Artôt (Cimetière de Montmartre, Division 19)

Alexandre Joseph Artôt (25 January 1815 – 20 July 1845) was a Belgian violinist.

== Life ==
He was born at Brussels into a musical family. His father was Maurice Artôt (1772–1829), first horn-player at the theatre in Brussels. His mother was Jeanne Catherine Borremans, from the musical family of Charles and Joseph Borremans. His father was born with the surname Montagny or Montaguey, but had adopted the professional name Artôt, which was preserved by all his children. Alexandre's older brother was the horn player Jean Désiré Artôt, who later became the father of soprano Désirée Artôt.

Alexandre received instruction in music and on the violin from his father, and at the age of seven played at the theatre a concerto of Giovanni Battista Viotti. He received further instruction from Joseph-François Snel, principal first violin at the theatre, and afterwards at the Paris Conservatory from Rodolphe and Jean Nicolas Auguste Kreutzer, and in 1827 and 1828 he obtained the second and first violin prizes respectively. According to Fétis, Artôt then played in concerts in Brussels and London with the greatest success, and became for a time player in the various Parisian orchestras.

He became famous as a soloist, and made tours through Belgium, Holland, Italy, Germany, etc. On 3 June 1839, the same occasion that the singer Giovanni Matteo Mario first appeared in England, Artôt played at the Philharmonic a fantasia of his own for violin and orchestra, and was well received, rather on account of the delicacy and feeling of his playing and his remarkable execution, than from his tone, which was very small. We do not find that he played at any other public concert, and this is borne out by a letter of 6 August the same year from Berlioz to Liszt, wherein details are given concerning musical taste in London at the time, received from Alexander Batta, who had just returned from there, and whose mutual conversation he reports at length: "I arrived too late, and it is the same with Artôt, who, despite his success at the Philharmonic, despite the incontestable beauty of his talent, has a tedious time of it."

In 1843 he went to America, Cuba, etc., on a concert tour with Laure Cinti-Damoreau, and while there he received the first symptoms of a lung disease. He never recovered, but died July 20, 1845, at Ville d'Avray near Paris. Upon his death, the Athenaeum noted, "He was, perhaps, the most finished and the most elegant of all the Rubini school of players; one of the handsomest men in our recollection; and much beloved, we are told, among his comrades for his gentleness and amiability."

== Compositions ==
Artôt's compositions for the violin include a concerto in A minor, various fantasias and airs with variations with piano or orchestral accompaniment, and, in manuscript, string quartets, and a quintet for piano and strings.
