= Laffillé =

Laffillé (also spelled Laffillée and Lafille) is a surname of French origin meaning 'the daughter' or 'the girl'. Notable people with the surname include:

== Lafille ==
- Laure-Line Lafille (judoka), French Polynesian judoka
- Laure-Line Lafille (wrestler), Australian freestyle wrestler
- Marc Andre Lafille (born 1988), French judoka

== Laffillé ==
- Charles Laffillé (1771–1848), French composer
- Jean-François Laffillé (born 1962), French cyclist
- Pierre Laffillé (1938–2011), French painter

== Laffillée ==
- Henri Laffillée (1859–1947), French architect
- Jacques Laffillée (1889–1970), French architect
