= Nicolas Huau =

French actor and theatre manager

Nicolas Huau was an 18th-century French actor and theatre manager.

Managing director of the theatre of Abbeville in 1730 and 1731, he was in The Hague that last year then became director of the Théâtre de la Monnaie of Brussels from 1734 to 1736. This is where he had Zaïre by Voltaire, La Vie est un songe by Louis de Boissy and L'Embarras des richesses by Dallainval premiered.

Back to The Hague in 1736, he stayed there until 1741, then directed the comedy of Dunkirk from 1741 to 1749 and returned to Brussels in 1751.

In 1753, he gave performances in Liège and returned to Brussels where his wife died in 1756. Under the name Mlle Huau, she published in The Hague in 1739 a three-act comedy entitled Le Caprice de l'amour.

Preceded by Francisque	Director of Théâtre royal de la Monnaie; 1734–1736	Succeeded by Dugazon
