= Camilla Urso =

French-born American violinist (1840–1902)

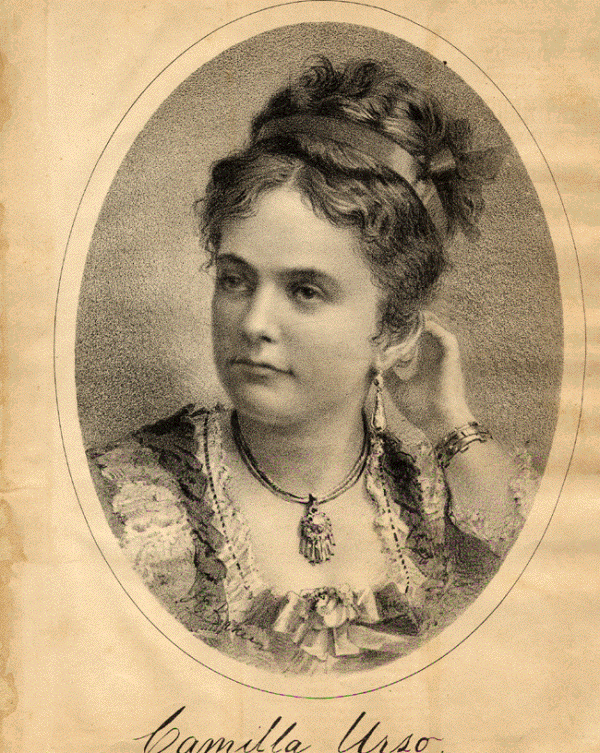
Camilla Urso

Camilla Urso (13 June 1840 – 20 January 1902) was a French-born child prodigy violinist, who became an American musician, "recognized as one of the finest violinists of the latter half of the 19th century."

== Early life ==
Born Émilie-Camille Urso in Nantes, France, she was the first daughter of an Italian flutist (Salvator Urso) and a French singer (Émilie Gérouard). The first of five children, Camilla's birthdate is still being disputed by historians, some claiming the year of her birth to be 1840, and others claiming it to be 1842. The family lived with her mother's sister, Caroline. Not much is known about Camilla's childhood, but most research shows that her interest in the violin began when "she heard a violin solo played during the Mass for St. Cecilia" during mass at her father's church, and begged to take the instrument up. When she was six years old, despite general skepticism about her ability to master a "masculine" instrument, she began taking violin lessons. Camilla's parents made a deal with concertmaster of the theater orchestra, Félix Simon, where he would teach Camilla without pay, and within a year's time, they would decide if Camilla would continue her studies or not. She started out studying for three hours a day, and eventually, that time was increased to seven hours a day. She made her debut a year after studying, at a benefit concert for the family of a recently deceased bassoon player in her father's orchestra. She played a piece by the name of de Beriot's Seventh Air Varie, which according to sources, "she learned at the rate of one page per week, and which she had to repeat forty-seven times at one lesson before her teacher would allow her to leave."

== Paris Conservatory ==
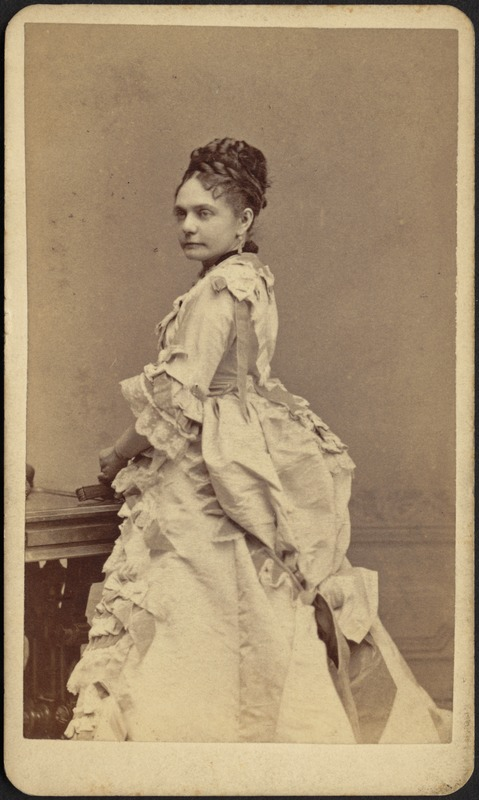
Camilla Urso, [ca. 1859–1870]. Carte de Visite Collection, Boston Public Library

Urso studied at the Paris Conservatory for three years, admitted in June 1849, and passing her final exam in July 1852. She was not accepted into the Conservatory right away. Being only eight years old when the family arrived in Paris, she was a year too young to audition. Also, the only females who were previously accepted into the Conservatory were allowed to study harmony, piano, organ, harp keyboard harmony, and solfege only. Urso competed against seventy-six boys for nine spots open in the violin class in front of an established panel of musicians, including Alard, Auber, Caraffa and Rossini. Although Lambert Massart took Urso in without asking for pay, he was known for his rigorous coursework and strictness, keeping a stick on hand to beat any student that did not keep up. Urso, despite being female, was not exempt from this punishment. According to Susan Kagan, "Camilla Urso had no real childhood; between the ages of seven and ten, while a student at the prestigious Paris Conservatory (the first girl ever admitted there), she practiced eight hours or more a day."

In 1852 in the annual student competition she won third place certificates of merit in solfège and violin (Viotti's Violin Concerto No. 24). She was the first female student at the Conservatory to win a prize on violin.

== Career ==
In the autumn of 1852 she appeared in New York City with her own company of assisting artists, including her father on flute. Reporting on her appearance at a private soirée, the Evening Post (27 September 1852) wrote: "She handles the violin with as much freedom and ease as a Spanish lady does her fan." The Mirror (1 October 1852), reviewing her debut at Metropolitan Hall on 30 September, reported: "Her appearance was singularly prepossessing, her pose firm, correct, yet easy, and her little arm guided the bow with grace and precision. She breathed into the instrument a mellowness, an expression, a purity of sound truly remarkable. Even in the fortissimo parts she appeared to have the requisite strength, and the richness and fullness of her notes contrasted strangely with the delicate diminutiveness of this little mistress of the violin." Urso was accompanied by an orchestra conducted by Theodore Eisfeld, and the program included the Viotti concerto, Bériot's Air varié, and Alexandre Artôt's Souvenirs de Bellini.

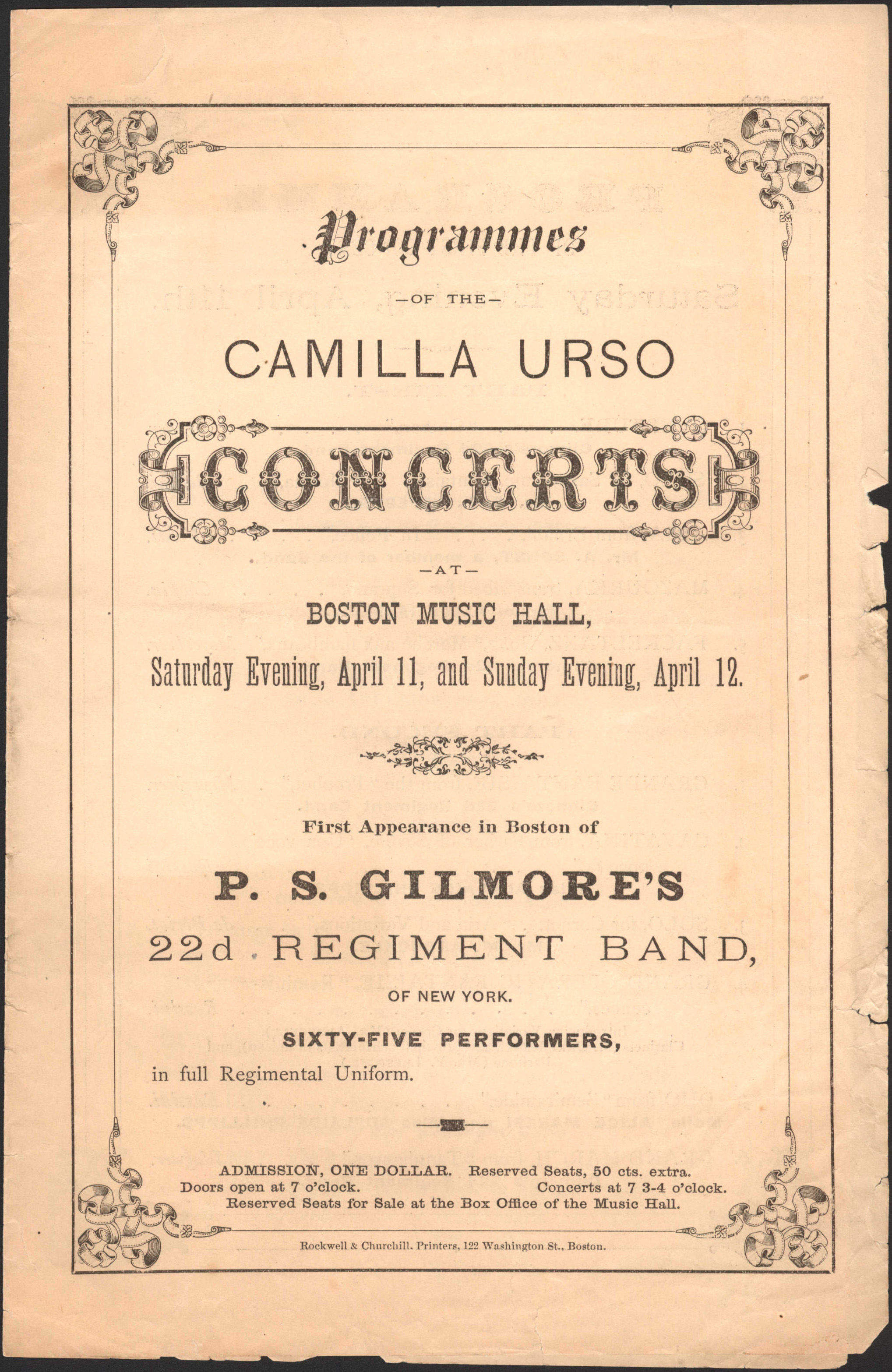
Boston concerts, 1863

Urso later appeared in Boston, Philadelphia, and other American cities. She was exceedingly successful, especially in concerts with Alboni and Sontag.

In 1855 she and her parents established a residence in Nashville, Tennessee.

Urso played with the Philharmonic Society in Boston in 1863, and later that same year in New York with the New York Philharmonic. In 1863–1864 she toured New England with the Patrick S. Gilmore band and in 1864–1865 went on tour in Canada. In June 1865 she appeared to great acclaim in Paris. For the next thirty years she toured the United States and abroad, including Australia and South Africa. Towards the end of her life she lived in New York, where she taught privately and at the National Conservatory of Music.

Urso slowed down her performances from 1895, but did undertake a tour of the US Northwest in 1901. The Tacoma Ledger of June 8, 1901, commented: Camilla Urso is still the world's greatest violiniste. Under her fingers the strings are sweet as the murmur of winds, melodious as the songs of birds. She makes them talk, warble, laugh and weep.

Urso was to perform in a concert at Seaver's Opera Hall, Barton, Vermont, on 25 January 1902 and a further concert in Williamstown, Massachusetts, on 29 January, but developed complications from appendicitis and died in New York on 20 January 1902 and is buried in the Green-Wood Cemetery.

== Sources ==
- Brodsky Lawrence, Vera (1995). Strong on Music: The New York Music Scene in the Days of George Templeton Strong. vol. II: Reverberations, 1850–1856. Chicago: University of Chicago Press. ISBN 9780226470115.
- Pierre, Constant, editor (1900). Le Conservatoire national de musique et de déclamation. Documents historiques et administratifs. Paris: Imprimerie National. 1031 pages. View at Internet Archive.
