= Adolphe Grognier =

French actor and singer

Adolphe Grognier, known under the pseudonym Jean-Baptiste Quélus (14 January 1813 – 14 December 1883), was a French actor and singer. The son of lawyer Louis-Furcy Grognier (1777–1832), and Hélène Caylus, he was appointed twice as director of La Monnaie of Brussels, in 1854 and 1856.

== Life ==
Born in Aurillac, Grognier was first a sailor, then actor. In 1843 he met the young Rachel in Lyon with whom he fell in love and whose acting troupe he joined for a while.

He was then teacher of singing at the Conservatoire royal de Bruxelles where one of his last pupils was his compatriot Emma Calvé.

Grognier died in Brussels at age 70.

== Award ==
Chevalier of the Ordre de Léopold.

== Publications ==
- Études dramatiques et oratoires, conseils aux comédiens et aux chanteurs, Brussels, éditions De Dietrie-Thomson, 1858

== Sources ==
- Souvenir du 22 mai 1881 - Fête organisée en faveur de M. Grognier-Quélus, professeur de déclamation au conservatoire de Bruxelles, Bruxelles, éditions Félix Calewaert-père, 1881
- Journal de Hélène Delpech de Frayssinet, née Grognier, 1897, AD15.

Preceded by Édouard Duprez and Eugène Massol	director of the Théâtre de la Monnaie; 1849-1850	Succeeded by Charles-Louis-Joseph Hanssens
Preceded by Letellier	director of the Théâtre de la Monnaie; 1858-1861	Succeeded by Letellier
