= Marianne Dujardin =

French opera singer

Marianne Dujardin, (ca. 1680 - floruit 1746), was a French actress, opera singer, and theatre director. She was the director of the La Monnaie in Brussels from 1724 to 1726. Dujardin is regarded as one of the earliest and most notable French female theatre directors and as a pioneer for colleagues of her gender in that role.

== Life ==
Dujardin was part of the choir of the Royal Music Academy of Paris. As part of this choir, she took on small roles in performances such as Iphigénie et Tauride by Antoine Danchet and André Campra (6 May 1704), La Vénitienne by Antoine Houdar de La Motte and Michel de La Barre (16 May 1705), and in a reprisal of Alceste by Philippe Quinault and Jean-Baptiste Lully (25 November 1706). From then on, she also performed larger roles, such as Junon in Sémélé by La Motte and Marin Marais (9 April 1709), and Manto in Manto la Fée by Mennesson and Jean-Baptiste Stuck (29 January 1711). Manto was her last role at l'Opera, which she left to travel to Rouen.

During the next year, Dujardin directed a troupe that performed in Brussels and Ghent. The troupe arrived in Rennes in 1718, and travelled further north towards Lille. She joined the troupe of Denis and Garnier, and later took on leadership over this group.

This new troupe performed in The Hague and Antwerp between 1721 and 1723, and in Brussels in 1724, where Dujardin became director of La Monnaie from 1725 to 1726. She directed the theater of Metz (1729-1731), and travelled to Avignon (1731), Bayonne (1733), Toulouse and Montauban (1734), and finally to Marseille (1734-1736).

In 1735, Dujardin received permission to build a new, open theater hall in the garden of the Hôtel de Ville of Bordeaux. Afterwards, she found herself in Bayonne (1736-1737), Avignon (1738), and Toulouse (1737). She returned to Marseille in 1738. She sang at Bordeaux and Toulouse in 1746. This is the last that is known of her.

Preceded by Thomas-Louis Bourgeois	Director of the Théâtre de la Monnaie; 1724-1726	Succeeded by Antonio Maria Peruzzi
