= Adolphe Danhauser =

French musician, educator, music theorist and composer (1835–1896)

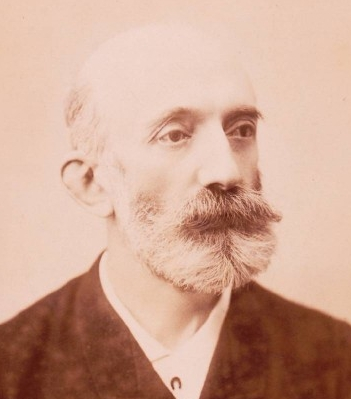
Adolphe Danhauser

Adolphe-Léopold Danhauser (26 February 1835 – 9 June 1896) was a French musician, educator, music theorist and composer.

== Life and career ==
Adolphe Danhauser was born in Paris and studied at the Paris Conservatoire with François Bazin, Fromental Halévy and Napoléon Henri Reber. He won the Second Prix de Rome in 1863 and began to develop an interest in early music education while still at the Conservatoire. In 1872 he published Theory of Music which is still printed and considered authoritative. In 1875, Danhauser was appointed chief inspector of instruction in singing in the schools of Paris. Later he took the position of professor of solfeggio at the Paris Conservatoire. He conducted a tour through the Netherlands, Belgium and Switzerland to survey systems of music pedagogy. Danhauser died in Paris.

Notable students include Charles Malherbe.

== Works ==
Selected compositions include:

- Maures et Castillans, opera in three acts (unproduced)
- Le Proscrit, one-act musical drama with chorus, 1866
- Orphéoniques evenings, collection
- Mélodies Vocales

Danhauser books on music theory and teaching have been reprinted, translated, and reviewed. These include:

- Music theory, Paris, H. Lemoine, 1872
- Music theory, revised edition by Henri Rabaud, Paris, H. Lemoine, 1928
- Music theory, revised and enlarged edition, Paris, H. Lemoine, 1994 (ISBN 978-0230922266)
- Questionnaire. Appendix to the theory of music, Paris, H. Lemoine, 1879
- Questionnaire. Appendix to Music Theory, revised edition by Henri Rabaud, Paris, H. Lemoine, 1928
- Abstract of the theory of music, Paris, H. Lemoine, 1879
- Abstract of music theory, revised edition by Henri Rabaud, Paris, H. Lemoine, 1928
- Abstract of the theory of music, new and revised edition by Sophie Jouve-Ganvert, Paris, H. Lemoine, 1990
- Solfeggio solfeggios, Paris, H. Lemoine, 3 volumes, 1881-1907 (ISBN 978-0793553266)
