= Charles Bernardy =

Charles-Alexandre Bernard (17 May 1724, Antwerp – 15 June 1807, rue de Vaugirard, Paris), known as Charles Bernardy, was a dancer, choreographer and dancing master.

He criss-crossed the Southern Netherlands, the Netherlands, the principality of Liège and France continuously for 40 years. From October 1752 until Palm Sunday 1753, Bernardy and his wife directed the theatre at Ghent, where she had already dancing in the preceding season (in Prince of Orange's troop). The Prince of Orange's troop was at The Hague in May 1753, but Charles Bernardy does not seem to have followed them there. In 1755, he was one of the lead dancers of the Theater am Kärntnertor at Vienna, under the direction of the choreographer Franz Hilverding. Ribou and Baptiste, actors from Ghent and Brussels, had already moved to that theatre and would surely have sung Bernardy's praises to its intendant comte Durazzo. Bernardy remained there for several seasons and there met dancers such as Antoine Pitrot and the future choreographer Gasparo Angiolini. In 1759 he put on ballets such as Les Turcs and Les Perruquiers there.

Called to Brussels as ballet-master for the 1763–1764 season, Bernardy put on the ballet Rhœcus ou les Hamadryades at the Théâtre de la Monnaie, premiering on 29 May 1763. A month later, he composed Circé ou la Délivrance des compagnons d'Ulysse.

Next, he danced in London in 1764 and 1765, led his troop to Amiens, Arras and Calais, then returned to Ghent in autumn 1766. From 1767 to 1774, he directed the theatre in Liège, then in Spa and then in Maastricht.

In 1775, he gathered a children's troupe, directing them at Antwerp and Rotterdam under the name of the "Brabantsche Kinderen" (The Brabant Children). From 1775 to 1780, the troupe put on shows at Amiens, Cambrai, Strasbourg, Colmar, Paris (at the "théâtre des Petits Comédiens du Bois de Boulogne"), Angers, Le Mans, Aix-en-Provence, Toulon, Marseille, Dijon, Passy, Saint-Quentin, Antwerp and Brussels.

Bernardy finally settled down at Liège, from there directing the theatres at Spa, Maastricht, Ghent, Bruges and Ostend. He gave up the direction of these theatres from 1793 and installed himself in Paris with his granddaughter, mademoiselle Fleury, actress in the Comédie-Française.
