= Francisque (actor) =

French actor

François Moylin, called Francisque, was an 18th-century French actor born c.1695 and died c. 1760. He was a member of a family of actors famous throughout the eighteenth century.

An actor in fairs and showman impresario, Francisque first played in the province and came to Paris to the foire Saint-Germain in 1715 and then to that of 1718.

In 1720 he founded a troupe composed largely of his family, in which his brother Simon played Harlequin. At the 1721 foire Saint-Laurent, Francisque was allowed to open an opéra comique show. This privilege was not extended and the Comédie-Française forbade him to perform plays with dialogues, leaving no choice but employing puppeteers and rope dansers

Francisque fled Paris in 1723 and travelled through the provinces. Grenoble, Nancy, Rouen, Amiens, Avignon, Marseille, Bordeaux, Toulouse, Brussels and The Hague could admire the skill of the actor and the troupe director as talented as he was mysterious. In 1733–1734 he was Director of the Théâtre de la Monnaie in Brussels.

The last mention we have of him dates from 1756 and it is not known whether he had a wife nor offspring.

Preceded by Joseph Bruseau de La Roche	Director of Théâtre royal de la Monnaie; 1733–1734	Succeeded by Nicolas Huau
