= Joseph Borremans =

Joseph Borremans (25 November 1775 in Brussels – 15 May 1858 in Brussels) was a composer, organist and conductor in the United Kingdom of the Netherlands.

In Brussels, he was Kapellmeister at the Church of St. Michael and St. Gudula (until 1835?), organist of the Church of St. Nicholas and second conductor of the Theatre of La Monnaie where, amongst others, the next works were performed:

- Klapperman ou le Crieur de nuit d'Amsterdam, Opéra comique in one act performed on 31 October 1804;
- La Femme impromptue, Opera buffa performed in 1808;
- Offrande à Vlujmen, scène lyrique performed on 31 October 1816.

As an organist, he was noted for his improvisational abilities. As a religious composer, he wrote Masses, Te Deums, motets, etc. with orchestral accompaniment.

The composer Charles Borremans was his eldest brother.
