= Napoléon Henri Reber =

French composer (1807–1880)

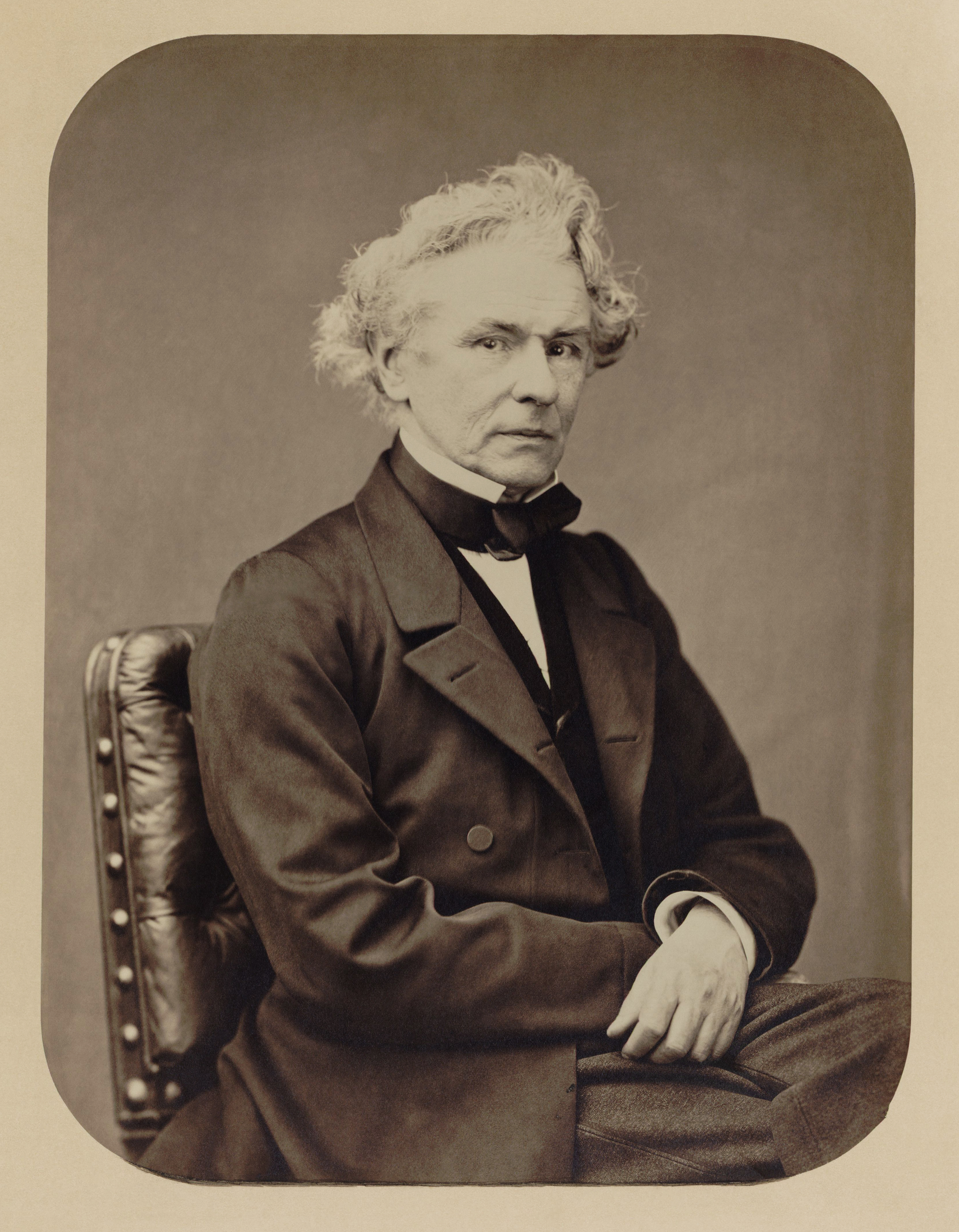
Napoléon Henri Reber. c. 1865

Napoléon Henri Reber (21 October 1807 – 24 November 1880) was a French composer.

== Life and career ==
Reber was born in Mulhouse, Alsace, and studied with Anton Reicha and Jean François Lesueur, wrote chamber music, and set to music works of French poets. He became professor of harmony at the Conservatoire de Paris in 1851, succeeded Fromental Halévy as professor of composition in 1862 and served as inspector of the branch conservatories. In 1853, he was elected to the chair previously occupied by George Onslow in the Académie des Beaux Arts.

His instrumental arrangement of Frédéric Chopin's Funeral March from the Funeral March Sonata was played at the graveside during Chopin's burial at Père Lachaise Cemetery in Paris on 30 October 1849.

He was made a chevalier of the Legion of Honour in 1855, and an officer in 1870. On his death, he was succeeded as a member of the Institut by Camille Saint-Saëns. Notable students include Adolphe Danhauser and Jules Massenet.

Reber died in Paris.

== Works ==
Among his works are a ballet, Le Diable amoureux (written jointly with François Benoist, 1840); the comic operas, Le Nuit de Noël (1848), Le Père Gaillard (1852), Les Papillotes de M. Benoist (1853), and Les Dames capitaines (1857); four symphonies, and much chamber music. He wrote a Traité d'harmonie (1862), which went through many editions.

Reber's compositions include a string quintet (his opus 1; with extra cello), two string quartets, a piano quartet (1866) and seven piano trios, and the four symphonies mentioned below:

- Symphony No. 1 in D minor
- Symphony No. 2 in C major (published by Richault of Paris)
- Symphony No. 3 in E♭ major (apparently by 1850; published by Richault of Paris)
- Symphony No. 4 in G major (apparently by 1850; published by Richault of Paris)
