= Joseph Bruseau de La Roche =

18th-century theatre manager

Joseph Bruseau de La Roche (? in Paris – 17 July 1750 in Brussels) was an 18th-century French actor, playwright and theatre manager.

Joseph Bruseau La Roche directed the Théâtre de la Monnaie from 1731 to 1733, a job that had previously been handled by Jean-Richard Le Roux. The theater knew several successful performances under his guidance, but also endured harsh competition by the Théâtre du Coffy. La Roche relinquished the position in 1733, but remained in contact with the theater throughout his acting career. He was succeeded by François Moylin.

La Roche composed several theatre plays:

- 1729: Arlequin Thémistocle (Brussels)
- 1731: Le Jugement comique ou la Revue des spectacles de Bruxelles (Brussels)
- 1732: Divertissements pour célébrer la fête de sa Majesté Imperiale et Catholique (Vienna)
- 1739: Les Athéniens, ballet (Brussels)
- 1744: Arlequin larron, prévôt et juge (Brussels)
- 1749: Le Retour de la paix dans les Pays-Bas (Brussels).

During the 1740s, La Roche was a seller of wallpaper and tapestries.

== Sources ==
Preceded by Jean-Richard Le Roux, called Durant	Director of Théâtre royal de la Monnaie; 1731–1733	Succeeded by Francisque
