= Louis-François Ribié =

Louis-François Ribié (1758 in Paris – 1830 in Martinique), also known as César Ribié, was a French actor and theatre manager.

Preceded by Marc d'Oberny and Champmêlé	director of Théâtre royal de la Monnaie; 1799-1801	Succeeded by Joseph-Auguste Dubus
