= André Wormser =

French composer

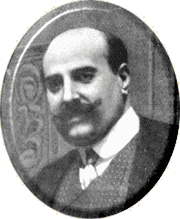
André Wormser

André Alphonse Toussaint Wormser (1 November 1851 – 4 November 1926) was a French Romantic composer.

== Life and career ==
André Wormser was born in Paris and studied with Antoine Marmontel and François Bazin at the Paris Conservatoire. As a very wealthy man, Wormser was able to afford a membership in the social club Cercle artistique et littéraire.

In 1872, Wormser won the Premier Prix in piano at the Paris Conservatoire, and in 1875, he won the Prix de Rome for his cantata Clytemnestre. He is best known for the pantomime L'Enfant prodigue (1890), which was performed across Europe and revived at the Booth Theatre in New York in 1916 (as the three-act play Pierrot the Prodigal). He died in Paris.

Notable students include Charles Malherbe.

== Works ==
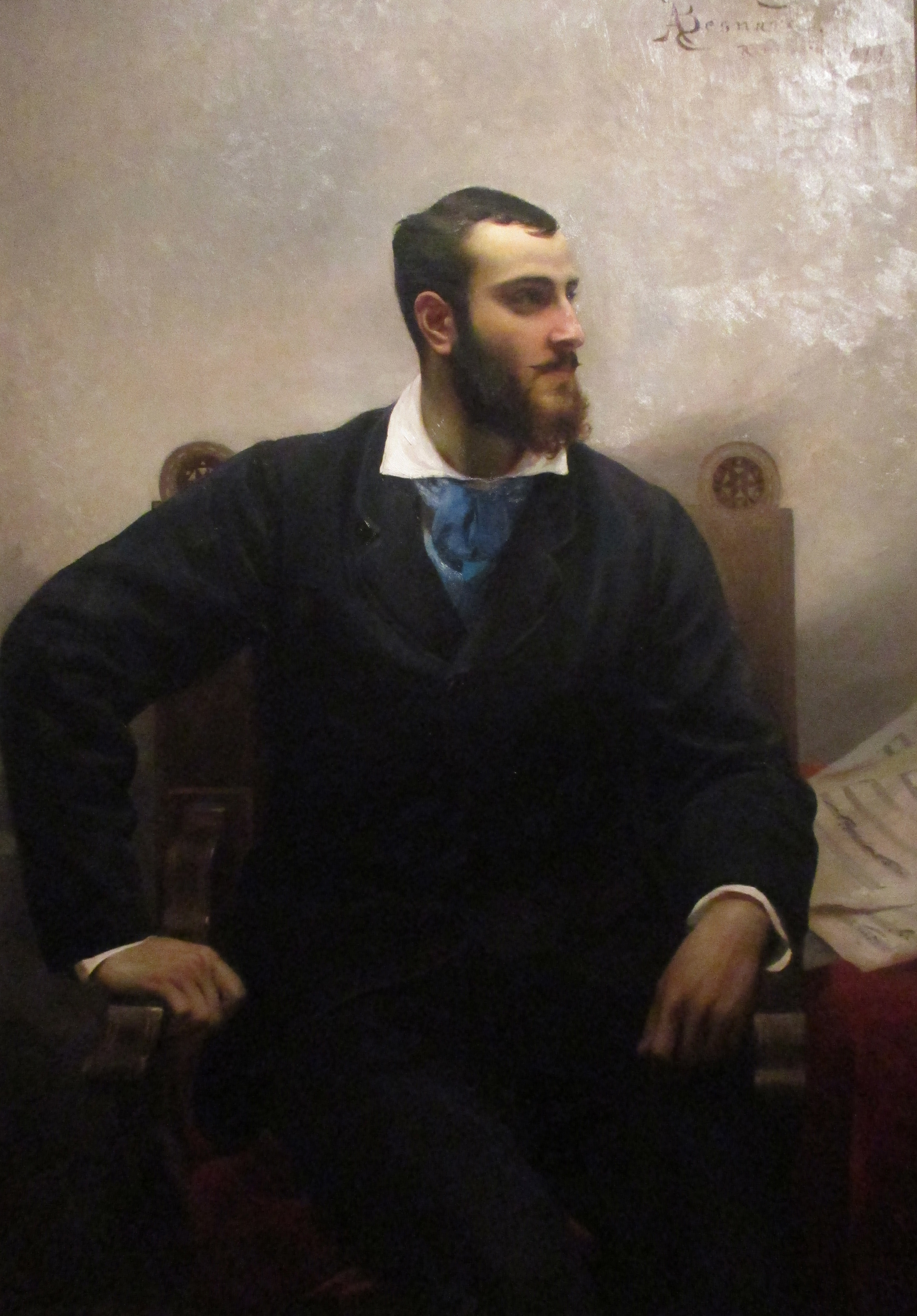
Portrait of André Wormser by Albert Besnard (1877).

Wormser composed choral and orchestral music, opera and works for solo instrument and voice. Selected works include:

- L'Enfant prodigue, pantomime (1890; scenario by Michel Carré)
- L'Étoile, Ballet-pantomime en deux actes (Opéra, Paris, 31 May 1897; choreography by Joseph Hansen)
- Ballada for Oboe and Piano (1909)
- Clytemnestre, cantata (1897)
- Rêverie (Gypsy Suite) for violin and piano
- Adèle de Ponthieu, opera (1887)
- Rivoli, opera (1896)
