= Charles-Louis-Joseph Hanssens =

Belgian conductor and composer

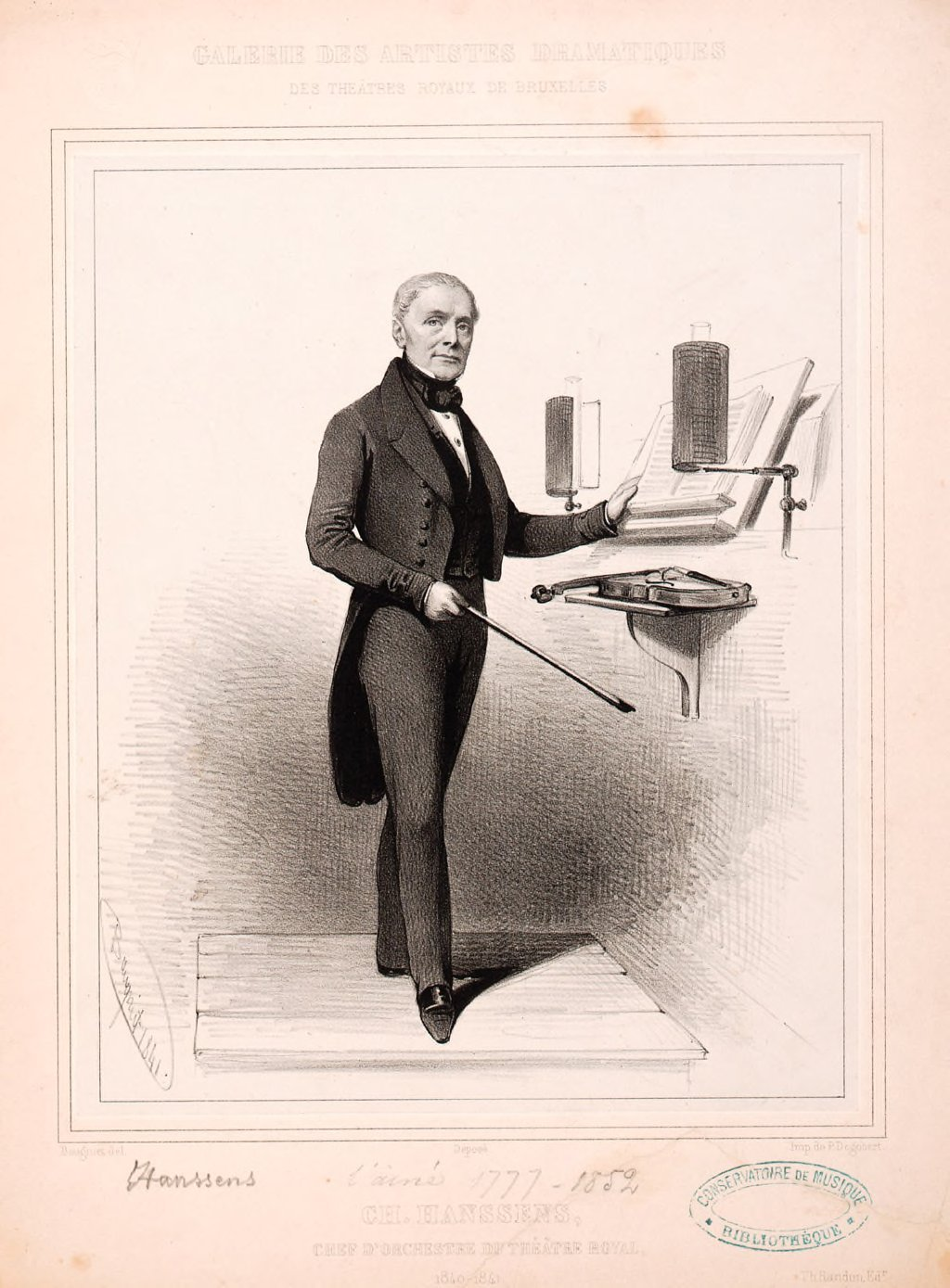
Hanssens the elder

Charles-Louis-Joseph Hanssens, known under the name Hanssens the elder (4 May 1777 – 6 May 1852), was a Belgian violinist, composer, conductor and theatre director. His brother Joseph-Jean Hanssens (c1770-1816) was also a conductor. His son was the cellist, conductor and composer Charles-Louis Hanssens (1802–1871).

== Life ==
Hanssens was born in Ghent. After studying violin in his hometown, Hanssens went to Paris to study harmony with Henri Montan Berton. Back in Ghent, he directed the Theatre of Rhetoric, then followed Mademoiselle Fleury's troupe to Holland.

Called back to Ghent as conductor, he held this position until 1825, then succeeded Charles Borremans as conductor of the orchestra of La Monnaie in Brussels.

In 1826, he was one of the founders of the Société d'Apollon with his friend, the composer Joseph-François Snel.

In 1827, King William I of the Netherlands chose him to conduct the court music and appointed him inspector of the Royal Music School of Brussels the following year.

After a few years of eclipse, he took over the direction of the Monnaie orchestra in 1835, was dismissed in 1838 and returned a third time in 1840. From 1840 to 1847, he shared the direction of La Monnaie theatre with Louis Jansenne, Charles Guillemin and Louis Van Caneghem.

After he left the stage, he died from apoplexy at age 75 in Brussels.

== Work ==
Hanssens composed the operas Alcibiade, La partie de trictrac ou la belle-mère, Les dots and Le solitaire de Formentera as well as a number of religious works such as masses, motets and a cantata. He also wrote the occasional work Le vingt quatre août for Willem I's birthday. His Grande fantaisie no. 6 on different motives was popular in The Hague in the 1850s and often conducted by François Dunkler jr..

Preceded by Pierre Lemoigne	Director of La Monnaie; 1840-1847	Succeeded by Auguste Nourrit
