= Thomas-Louis Bourgeois =

Thomas-Louis Bourgeois (24 October 1676, Fontaine-l'Évêque – January 1750 or 1751, Paris) was a Walloon composer and haute-contre. He was maître de chapelle at Toul Cathedral, then Strasbourg Cathedral before employment from 1707 until 1711 at the Opéra de Paris as a singer. He worked in the service of the Duke of Bourbon between 1715 and 1721, after which he became the director of the Théâtre de la Monnaie in Brussels (1722–1724). This appointment was the start of the era of his professional life in which he travelled from one city to the next, taking him to Lille, Lyon, Poitiers, Dijon, Belgium and the Netherlands. Little is known about the last years of his life. He died in poverty in Paris. Bourgeois mainly wrote cantatas, ballets, and divertissements.

== Works, editions and recordings ==
- Les Amours déguisés (1713)
- Les Plaisirs de la Paix (1715).
- Cantatas: Les Sirènes. Borée. Zéphire et Flore. Hippomène. Psiché Carolyn Sampson Le Concert Lorrain Carus 2012

Preceded by Louise Dimanche	director of the Théâtre de la Monnaie; 1722–1724	Succeeded by Marianne Dujardin
