= Léon Gastinel =

French composer (1823–1906)

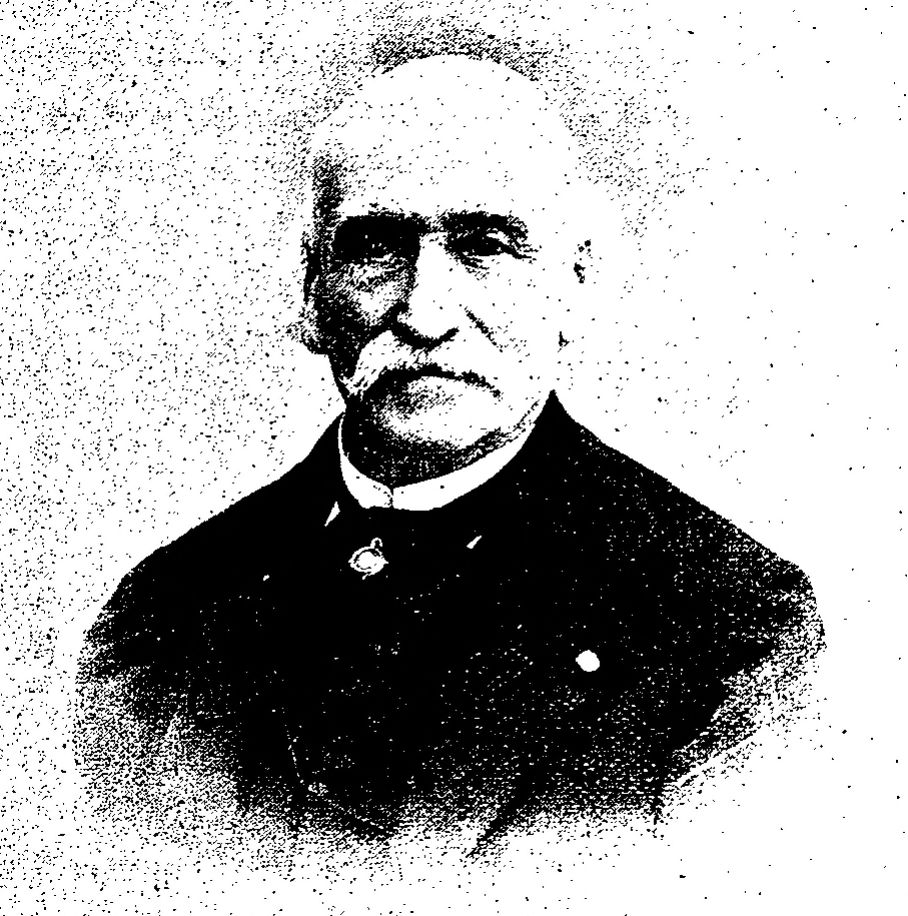
A portrait of Léon Gastinel the French composer

Léon Gastinel (15 August 1823 – 18 October 1906) was a French composer.

== Career ==
Gastinel attended the Paris Conservatoire where he studied with Fromental Halévy and was awarded the Grand Prix de Rome in 1846 for his cantata Valasquez; he also won the Prix Chartier, in 1865. While relatively unknown today, Gastinel wrote two complete masses, two symphonies and four oratorios, and chamber music including at least two string sextets. He was most prolific, however, in his works for the stage, which include the ballet Le Rêve (1890, choreographed by Joseph Hansen for the Paris Opera) and the operas Le Miroir (1853), L'Opéra aux fenêtres (1857) and Titus et Bérénice (1860).
