= Auguste Nourrit =

French opera singer

Auguste Nourrit (1808-1853) was a 19th-century French tenor and opera director, younger brother of famous Adolphe Nourrit and son of tenor Louis Nourrit.

== Life ==
Auguste Nourrit made his debut at the Opéra-Comique of Paris in 1826 and stayed there a few years before moving to the Hague in 1833 in order to head the Théâtre français.

After a brief stint at the Comédie-Française, he directed the Theatre of Antwerp in 1836–1837. In the early 1840s, he made a long tour of the United States and Canada: he sang especially in New Orleans, New York, then in Montreal, Quebec City and Toronto.

In 1847, he was appointed director of the Théâtre de la Monnaie in Brussels but had to give up in November, due to financial meltdown.

Preceded by Charles-Louis-Joseph Hanssens, Louis Jansenne, Charles Guillemin and Louis Van Caneghem	Director of Théâtre royal de la Monnaie; 1847	Succeeded by Édouard Duprez and Eugène Massol
