= Eugénie-Emilie Juliette Folville =

Belgian musician (1870–1946)

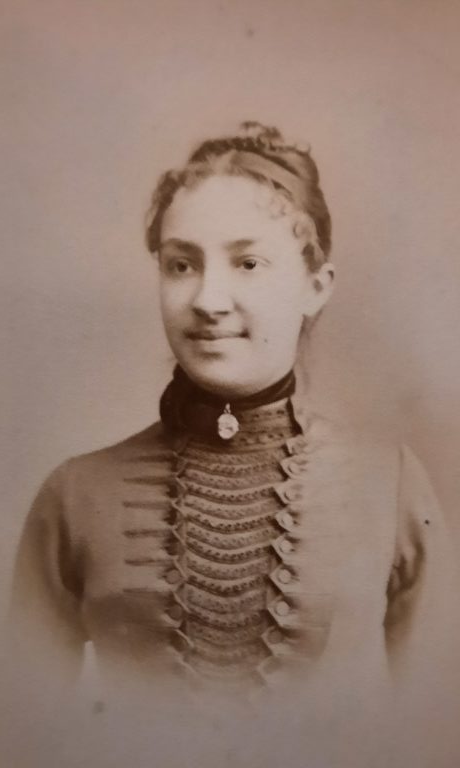

Background information
- Born: January 5, 1870; Liège, Belgium
- Died: 28 October 1946 (aged 76)
- Occupations: Pianist, Violinist, Composer

Eugénie-Emilie Juliette Folville (5 January 1870 – 28 October 1946) was a Belgian composer, pianist, violinist, music educator, conductor and organist.

== Life ==
Eugénie-Emilie Juliette Folville was born in Liège, Belgium, and began the study of music with her father who was a lawyer and amateur musician. She studied violin with Charles Malherbe, Ovide Musin and César Thomson and made her debut in Liège in 1879. She had a successful career on the concert stage, and in 1897 took a position teaching piano at the Royal Conservatory of Liège.

In 1914 she moved to Bournemouth, and during World War I she lived and performed there. She lived for several years in London, before returning to Belgium around 1932, and later moving to Dourgne, where she died on 28 October 1946.

== Works ==
Folville composed for theater, solo instruments, orchestra, chorus, and chamber ensemble. Selected works include:

=== Orchestral works ===
- Scènes champêtres. 1^{re} Suite d'orchestre, op. 9 (1885) : Aux Champs, Dans la montagne, Rêverie, Fête de village
- Scènes de la mer. 2^{e} Suite d'orchestre, op. 14 (1886) : Chanson du pêcheur, Nuit étoilée, Mer phosphorescente, Flots agités, Adieux à l'océan
- Scènes d'hiver. 3^{e} Suite d'orchestre, op. 17 (1887) : Ballade, La neige, Noël, Carnaval
- Violin concerto in G Minor, op. 20 (1888)
- Piano concerto in D Minor (1902–1903)
- Concerstück for cello and orchestra (1905)
- Impressions d'Ardenne, orchestral suite (1910)
- Triptyque for violin and orchestra, or piano (ca. 1935)

=== Chamber and piano works ===
- Souvenir de Mozart. 1^{re} Sonatine (op. 7, 1881) and 2^{e} Sonatine (op. 11, 1882)
- Berceuse for violin and piano, op. 24 (1890)
- En Ardenne. Esquisses pour piano (ca. 1910)
- 1^{er} Quatuor pour piano, op. 9 (1885)
- Berceuse for cello and quartet accompaniment [s.d.]
- Poème for cello and piano, or orchestra (ca.1908-1909)
- Mazurka for violin and piano (1910)
- Communion for organ (1912)
- Verset sur le thème du «Tantum», 6e ton for organ (1912)

=== Choral and vocal works ===
- Chants printaniers (1883–84)
- Atala. Drame lyrique en deux actes (1891), libretto by Paul Collin. Creation at the Grand Théâtre de Lille on 3 March 1892.
- Ewa. Légende Norwégienne, cantate pour soli, chœurs et accompagnement d'orchestre (ca. 1889), poem by Paul Collin.
- Noce au Village, op. 13 (1886), for solo, choir and orchestra, words by Paul Collin.
- Jean de Chimay. Drame lyrique en quatre actes, libretto by Alfred Billet, unfinished.
