= Oscar Poigny =

Daniel Oscar Peigne (5 April 1849 – 21 July 1899), known as Oscar Poigny, was a 19th-century French dancer and choreographer.

Poigny was born in Bordeaux to David Peigne and Esther Torres. He was a dancer in Paris in 1876 and he arrived in Brussels in September 1877, hired by Joseph Hansen, ballet master at the Théâtre de la Monnaie. When Hansen left in 1879, Poigny became, in turn, ballet master and remained in this position until 1886. From 1886 to 1889, he served in the same post in Lyon.

He married Thérèse Fassetta in 1880 in Brussels. He died in Vichy.

== Choreographies ==
- 1880: Une nuit de Noël, music by Oscar Stoumon (Brussels, 13 October)
- 1881: Hérodiade, music by Jules Massenet (Brussels, 19 December)
- 1882: Les Sorrentines, music by Oscar Stoumon (Brussels, 26 October)
- 1884: Le Poète et l'Étoile music by Jacques Steveniers (Brussels, 21 April)
- 1885: La Tzigane, music by Oscar Stoumon (Brussels, 27 March)
- 1890: Bouquetière, music by Émile Pichoz (Lyon, 3 February)
- 1890: Massilia, music by Armand Tedesco (Marseille, 25 March)
- 1893: Une fête au camp (Marseille, 28 January)
- 1893: Réïa, music by Joseph Monsigu (Marseille, 20 April)
- 1895: Les Madrilènes , music by François Perpignan (Royan, 8 August)
- 1895: L'Abeille et les Fleurs , music by Louis Ganne (Royan, 10 August)
- 1895: Les Mésaventures de Zéphirin, music by François Perpignan (Royan, 7 September)
- 1896: Rose d'amour, music by Pascal Clemente (Marseille, 1 January)

== Bibliography ==
- Jacques Isnardon, Le théatre de la Monnaie depuis sa fondation jusqu'à nos jours. Schott Frères. Brussel. 1890.

Preceded by Joseph Hansen (dancer)	Ballet Director of the Théâtre de la Monnaie; 1879-1886	Succeeded by Gaetano Saracco
