= Charles Malherbe =

French musicologist and composer (1853–1911)

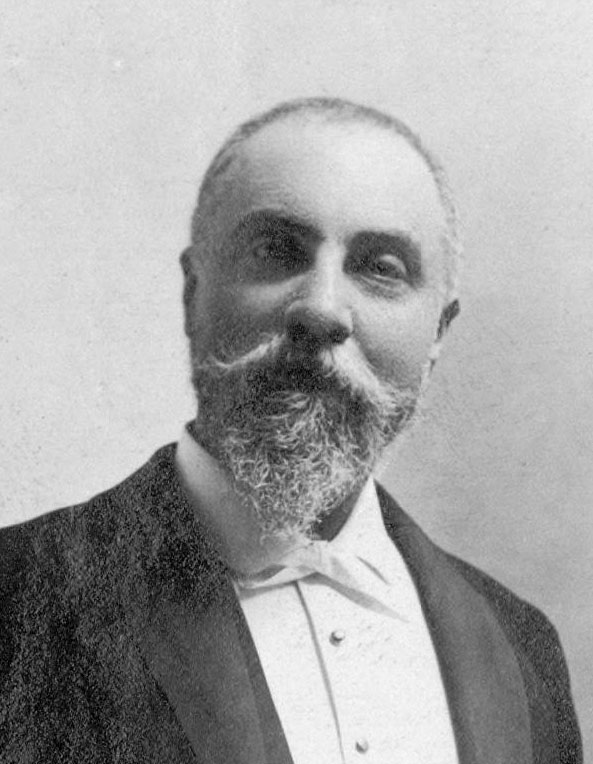
Charles Malherbe

Charles Théodore Malherbe (French pronunciation: [ʃaʁl teɔdɔʁ malɛʁb]; 21 April 1853 – 5 October 1911) was a French violinist, musicologist, composer and music editor.

== Life and career ==
Malherbe was born in Paris, son of Pierre Joseph Malherbe (1819–1890) and Zoé Caroline Mozin (1832–1921) the youngest daughter of French painter Charles Mozin (1806–1862). He studied law and was admitted to the bar, but instead decided on music as a profession. He studied music with Adolphe Danhauser, Jules Massenet and André Wormser, and served as Danhauser's secretary on a tour through Holland, Belgium and Switzerland to survey systems of music pedagogy in the public schools. He afterward settled in Paris, and became assistant to Charles Nuitter, the archivist-librarian of the Paris Opera Library in 1896, succeeding him in 1899. He edited the music periodical Le Ménestrel and also wrote for a number of other publications, including Le Guide musical, Progrès artistique, Revue internationale de musique and Le Monde artiste.

Beginning in 1895, Malherbe annotated sixteen volumes of Jean-Philippe Rameau's Œuvres complètes ("Complete works") (1895–1913), providing much information concerning performance practice and genre history, as well as Rameau himself. He initiated, in collaboration with Felix Weingartner, the first edition of Hector Berlioz's complete works (1900–1907). Although replete with errors (and now superseded by Hector Berlioz: New Edition of the Complete Works, edited by Hugh Macdonald), it was indispensable at the time.

Malherbe was a collector of documents, and acquired, besides thousands of autograph letters, a number of important manuscripts, including the largest extant collection of Beethoven sketches, the autograph scores of Berlioz's Symphonie fantastique, two Rameau cantatas, and several Bach cantatas. He discovered the original orchestral score of Rossini's opera Guillaume Tell at a secondhand book seller's shop. In 1901 he located previously uncatalogued works of Mozart, including a soprano aria from the opera Mitridate, re di Ponto, written at age 14 and an Elegy in F for two sopranos written at age 11. He also owned a number of Liszt manuscripts. With Albert Soubies, Malherbe published Précis de l'histoire de l'Opéra-Comique in 1887.

Malherbe died in Cormeilles, Eure at age 58, and his collection of manuscripts was donated to the Paris Conservatoire. Many are now housed at the Bibliothèque Nationale.

Notable violin students include composer Eugénie-Emilie Juliette Folville.

== Selected works ==
Malherbe composed several comic operas, plus chamber and orchestral music. Selected compositions include:

- Duo concertant
- Entr'acte–Sérénade
- Menuet de Lucette
- En Route, quickstep for orchestra

== Sources ==
- Stanley Sadie (ed.): The New Grove Dictionary of Music and Musicians, 2nd edition (London: Macmillan, 2001), ISBN 978-1-56159-239-5 (hardcover), OCLC 419285866 (eBook).
