= Louise Dimanche =

French opera singer

Louise Dimanche (before 1715 - floruit 1739), was a French actress, opera singer, ballet dancer, and theatre director. She was the director of the La Monnaie in Brussels from 1721 to 1722. She was the first woman to hold this position.

== Life ==
Dimanche was a dancer at La Monnaie in 1715, where she took part in Les Nouvelles Fêtes vénitiennes by Antoine Danchet and André Campra. It was followed by a performance of Omphale by Antoine Houdar de La Motte and André-Cardinal Destouches. Afterwards, she danced and sang in Lille in 1715–1718, where she married her first husband Antoine Vernet, a singer also known as Forêt.

After a short stay in The Hague in 1719, Dimanche was appointed director of Théâtre Royal de la Monnaie in Brussels. She was succeeded by Thomas-Louis Bourgeois, after which Dimanche returned to Lille where she remained and performed until 1725. She married her second husband, the singer Nicolas Demouchy, in Lille in the year 1722.

In 1729, Dimanche was a singer of the royal chapel in Dresden. Afterwards, she returned to Lille where she founded a new artistic troupe. She married Jean-Nicolas Prévost, one of the troupe's members, in 1737. The marriage took place in Brussels.

Dimanche returned to The Hague in 1739, where she gave birth to a son named Jean-François. His godmother was the French actress Jeanne Dulondel. Nothing is known of Dimanche's life after these events.

Preceded by Bruno-Emmanuel de Beaulieu	director of the Théâtre de la Monnaie; 1721-1722	Succeeded by Thomas-Louis Bourgeois
