= Paul Goubé =

French choreographer (1912–1979)

Paul Goubé (1912 in Paris – 30 March 1979, in Paris) was a 20th-century French dancer, choreographer, ballet master and teacher.

== Biography ==
A pupil of the Paris Opera Ballet, he was hired by the troupe and became premier danseur in 1933. Very expressive, he was the interpreter of Serge Lifar in several ballets, joined the Nouveau Ballet de Monte-Carlo in 1942, then the ballet of the Opéra-Comique.

He choreographed several works for the Grand Ballet du Marquis de Cuevas and founded in Nice in 1955, the Ballets de la Méditerranée. In 1959, he was the ephemeral ballet master of the Théâtre de la Monnaie in Brussels, excluded from the institution following the arrival of Maurice Béjart.

In 1969, he founded his Paris dance school, established Salle Pleyel with his wife Yvonne Alexander. The school was revived in 1995 by their daughter Jennifer, under the name "Goubé European Dance Center".

== Principal creations ==
- 1952: Le Lien
- 1953: Ad Alta
- 1954: Duo
- 1958: Le Feu aux Poudres
- 1959: Ad Alta (revived at the Théâtre de la Monnaie)

Preceded by Jean-Jacques Etchevery	Director of Théâtre royal de la Monnaie; 1959–1959	Succeeded by Maurice Béjart and the Ballet of the 20th Century
