= Jeanne Belhomme =

Jeanne Belhomme (d. fl. 1745), was a French actress and theatre director. She was the director of the La Monnaie in Brussels from 1743 to 1745. She shared the position jointly with Charles Plante.

== Life ==
Jeanne Belhomme was commonly known simply as "Demoiselle Belhomme". She was initially engaged as an actress at the La Monnaie. During the 1730s, she was listed with a salary of $800, which placed her among the elite of the actors of the theatre.

When the director Joseph Uriot resigned in 1743, she resumed the position of director and manager of the theatre La Monnaie in partnership with her colleague, Charles Plante. This was an unstable period in the history of the theatre, and few directors managed to handle the post very long.

In 1745, Belhomme and Plante resigned their co-directorship to Nicolini.

| Preceded by Joseph Uriot | director of the Théâtre de la Monnaie; 1743-1745; Jointly with:Charles Plante | Succeeded by Nicolini (Jean-Baptiste Grimaldi) |
