= Léonor Jean Soulas d'Allainval =

French playwright

- Born: Léonor Jean Soulas; 2 October 1696; Chartres
- Died: 2 May 1753 (aged 56); Paris
- Occupation: Playwright

Signature
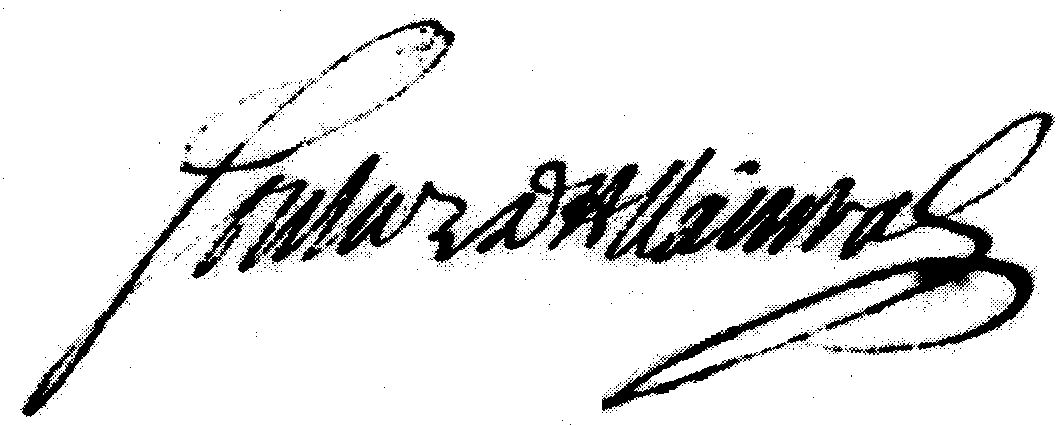

Léonor Jean Soulas d'Allainval, called abbé d'Allainval (né Léonor-Jean-Christin Soulas; born 2 October 1696, Chartres, Orléanais – died 2 May 1753, Hôtel-Dieu de Paris), was an 18th-century French playwright.

== Life ==
D'Allainval lived his life in misery and died an indigent, according to Jean Baudrais.

None of his plays were successful, except for a very short time his first comedy, L'Embarras des richesses, played four times in Paris during his lifetime and later considered a comedy "well conducted and well untied" and "one of his best works".

Only L'École des bourgeois brought him posthumous fame. Presented for the first time at the Comédie-Française in 1728, the play was revived only sixteen years after his death and played intermittently between 1769 and 1848. In 1854, it inspired Émile Augier and Jules Sandeau a new comedy which was like a sequel.

== Works ==
Theatre

- 1725: L'Embarras des richesses, three-act comedy, Paris, Hôtel de Bourgogne, 9 July. Rrprint: Espaces 34, Montpellier, 2006. Read online
- 1726: Le Tour de Carnaval, one-act comedy, Paris, Théâtre de l'hôtel de Bourgogne, 24 February Read online
- 1726: La Fausse Comtesse, comedy in prose, Paris, Théâtre de la rue des Fossés Saint-Germain, 27 July
- 1727: Le Tour de carnaval, one-act comedy, Paris, Théâtre de l'hôtel de Bourgogne
- 1728: L'École des bourgeois, three-act comedy with prologue, Paris, Théâtre de la rue des Fossés Saint-Germain, 20 September reprint: Espaces 34, Montpellier, 2006. Read online
- 1729: Les Réjouissances publiques, ou le Gratis, one-act comedy, Paris, Théâtre de la rue des Fossés Saint-Germain, 18 September
- 1731: Le Mari curieux, one-act comedy, Paris, Théâtre de la rue des Fossés Saint-Germain, 17 July
- 1733: L'Hiver, one-act comedy, Paris, Théâtre de l'hôtel de Bourgogne, 19 February
- 1734: La Fée Marote, opéra-ballet in one act, Paris, Foire Saint-Laurent, 28 August
- 1747: Le Jugement de Pâris, ou le Triomphe de la beauté, one-act comedy, Théâtre de Toulouse, 1 July

Varia

- 1730: Lettre à mylord *** on Baron and demoiselle Le Couvreur, où l'on trouve plusieurs particularités théâtrales, by Georges Wink. Reprint: Slatkine, Geneva, 1968. Read online
- 1732–1733: Ana (Allainvaliana), ou Bigarrures calotines
- 1745: Anecdotes du regne de Pierre premier, dit le grand, czar de Moscovie, contenant l'histoire d'Eudochia Federowna, & la disgrace du prince de Mencikow
- 1746: Anecdotes du regne de Pierre premier, dit le grand, czar de Moscovie, contenant son ordonnance du 10-21 février 1720, pour la réformation de son clergé
- 1785: Œuvres de l'abbé d'Allainval

== See also ==
- Embarrassment of riches
