= Jean-Jacques Etchevery =

French dancer and choreographer

Jean-Jacques de Peyret-Chappuis, called Jean-Jacques Etchevery (1916, Paris – 12 April 1997) was a 20th-century French dancer and choreographer.

== Training and Career ==
Trained by Lydia Karpova and Nicolas Zverev, from 1940 he danced at Les Ballets de Monte Carlo. In 1945, he founded his own company "L'Oiseau bleu". In 1946, Georges Hirsch called him as ballet master of the Paris Opera then entrusted him, as director of dance, to establish a new national ballet at the Opéra-Comique. After six years, he left the Opéra-Comique to become choreographer, director of ballet, stage director and finally director at the Théâtre de la Monnaie in Brussels. He signed his first mise en scène in 1956.

After three years he left that position to become a full-time stage director all over Europe and even at the Teatro Colón in Buenos Aires. He signed with the Grand Théâtre de Genève, when it reopened in 1962, where he organized the technical and administrative services and directed the stage. In 1973, he was appointed director of the Grand Théâtre de Tours where he would stay 10 full years.

A prolific choreographer and director, he mainly drew inspiration from poetry and painting.

== Some creations ==
- 1945: La Bourrée fantasque
- 1947: Khamma, by Claude Debussy
- 1949: Casse-Noisette
- 1951: La Chanson du mal-aimé (text by Guillaume Apollinaire, music by Léo Ferré)
- 1953: Pelléas et Mélisande (music by Gabriel Fauré)
- 1954: Les Bals de Paris
- 1955: Opéras-Ballets
- 1956: Manet
- 1956: Le Masque de la mort rouge, by Léon Jongen
- 1957: Pygmalion
- 1958: Mephisto-Valse (music by Franz Liszt)

Preceded by Nicolas Zverev	Director of Théâtre royal de la Monnaie; 1954–1959	Succeeded by Paul Goubé
