= Henri Justamant =

French choreographer and dancer

- Born: March 29, 1815; Bordeaux, France
- Died: January 2, 1893 (aged 77); Saint-Maur-des-Fossés, France
- Occupations: Choreographer, dancer, ballet master, director
- Years active: 1836–1869
- Era: 19th century
- Employer(s): Bordeaux Ballet, Lille Ballet, Lyon Ballet, Théâtre de la Monnaie, Paris Opera Ballet

Henri Justamant (29 March 1815 in Bordeaux – 2 January 1893 in Saint-Maur-des-Fossés) was a French choreographer and dancer.

== Career ==
He was a dancer in the Bordeaux Ballet in 1836 and later maître de ballet (master of ballet) in Lille between 1839 and 1840, Lyon from 1849 until 1851 and again from 1858 until 1861. In the same year, he became director of the Théâtre de la Monnaie in Brussels until 1864. From 1868 until 1869, he was director of the Paris Opera Ballet.

== Choreographies ==
His choreographies were at the city of his directorship.

- Le Guerz enchanté, ou le Joueur de biniou (performed in Lyon on 20 February 1851, and in Brussels on 10 March 1862)
- Les Bohémiens contrebandiers (performed in Lyon on 31 March 1851)
- Les Cosaques (performed on 22 April 1854)
- Lore-Ley, ou la Fée du Rhin (performed on 23 January 1856)
- Le Corsaire (performed on 17 February 1857)
- Une fille du ciel (performed in Lyon on 10 March 1858, and in Brussels on 1 September 1861)
- Quasimodo ou la Bohémienne (performed on 6 December 1859)
- Fleurs et papillons (performed on 22 October 1860)
- Les Néréides, ou le Lac enchanté (performed on 11 March 1861)
- Les Contrebandiers (performed on 19 October 1861)
- Le Fils de l'alcade (performed on 21 November 1861)
- Un bal travesti (performed on 24 January 1862)
- Les Songes (performed on 22 December 1862)
- Le Royaume des fleurs (performed on 6 May 1863)
- Flamma (performed on 19 December 1863)
- Les Amardyades (performed on 1 February 1864)
- L'Étoile de Messine (performed on 21 March 1864)
- Les Nymphes amazones (performed on 26 May 1864)
- Les Fugitifs (performed on 17 July 1868)
- Faust (performed on 3 March 1869)
- Ballet des Erynnies (performed on 19 May 1876)
- Les Folies espagnoles (performed on 30 April 1885)
- Ophélia (performed in June 1887)

== Sources ==
- Sarah Gutsche-Miller, Parisian Music-Hall Ballet, 1871-1913. Boydell & Brewer 2015. p. 307.
- Gabi Vettermann, In Search of Dance Creators’ Biographies: The Life and Work of Henri Justamant, in Les Choses Espagnoles: Research Into the Hispanomania of 19th Century Dance. Epodium 2009.

Political offices
Preceded by Henri Desplaces	Director of the Théâtre de la Monnaie; 1861-64	Succeeded by Hippolyte Monplaisir
Preceded by Lucien Petipa	Director of the Paris Opera Ballet; 1868-69	Succeeded by Louis-Alexandre Mérante
