= Jean Baudrais =

Jean Baudrais (14 August 1749, Tours – 4 May 1832, Bicêtre from cholera) was an 18th–19th-century French writer and magistrate.

== Man of letters ==
Based in Paris, where he married, since the age of twenty, he published in 1781 l'Allégresse villageoise, an entertainment mingled with singing and dancing, on the occasion of the birth of the Dauphin. Then he published La Vanité est bonne à quelque chose, a mock-heroic poem, in 1782, le Dieu Mars désarmé, entertainment in verse on the occasion of the treaty of Versailles of 1783. Author of numerous theater plays, he also was a publisher, publishing with Leprince la Petite bibliothèque des Théâtres, whose project was to bring together all plays of the comic and lyrical tragic scene with portrait of authors and records on their lives, judgments and anecdotes about each book and analytical catalog of all documents excluded from the collection.

== A politician during the Revolution ==
Faced with the emigration of many of his subscribers, he abandoned his literary career, devoted himself to politics, and joined various clubs. A member of the club des Jacobins, he obtained various public offices: commissioner of the district of the Filles Saint-Thomas, then employee to the signing of the assignats and Comptroller General of this paper money, twice a member of the electorate, a member of the General Council, as well as of the body and the municipal office of the Commune de Paris after the day of the 10 August. In that latter capacity, he attended on 21 January 1793 the execution of Louis XVI, receiving and countersigning his will and exercised the functions of censor.

Under the reign of Terror, he was a police officer. Dismissed for having said that, had he had to judge Louis XVI, he would have condemned him to deportation rather than to the death penalty, he was imprisoned and transferred to the Conciergerie. However, after the 9 Thermidor, he escaped the Revolutionary Tribunal. Soon after, he was appointed justice of the peace by the section de la Halle-aux-Blés.

== Life in America ==
In 1797, he was sent to Guadeloupe in order to occupy the fonctions of judge of the civil, criminal and appeal courts in matters of trade and maritime seizures.

He lived for three years in this colony when, after the plot of the rue Saint-Nicaise, he was included on the list of proscription of the 5 January 1801. According to some biographers, he was mistaken for Baudray, owner of the "cafe des Bains chinois" on the boulevard des Italiens. Despite his protests, he was deported to Cayenne, where he served as clerk of court, notary and responsible for keeping the civil registers.

At the proclamation of the First French Empire, he refused to swear allegiance to Napoleon and resigned before retiring with his wife to the United States, where he saw the work of his hands for thirteen years.

Leaving New York, he returned to France in 1817, where he had to belie newspapers and biographies saying he died in Guyana in 1801. Admitted to the hospital for old men of Bicêtre, while his wife was admitted in another home, he died during the 1829–51 cholera pandemic at the age of 83.

== Works ==
- 1785–1789: Étrennes de Polymnie. Choix de chansons, romances et vaudevilles, Paris, 5 vol.
- 1791: Essai sur l'Origine et les progrès de l'art dramatique en France, Paris, 3 vol. (unfinished)
- 1783–1790: Petite bibliothèque des Théâtres (in collaboration with Le Prince), Paris, 72 vol. (incomplete collection)

== Sources ==
- Eugène Ernest Desplaces, Joseph Francois Michaud, Louis Gabriel Michaud (dir.), Biographie universelle ancienne et moderne, 1854, tome 3, p. 290-291
- Ferdinand Hoefer (dir.), Nouvelle biographie générale depuis les temps les plus reculés jusqu'à nos jours, Paris, Firmin Didot frères, 1859, tome 4, p. 790-791
