= Joseph Hansen (dancer) =

Belgian ballet dancer (1842–1907)

Joseph Hansen (8 March 1842 in Antwerp – 27 July 1907 in Asnières) was a Belgian dancer and choreographer. He was maître de ballet (ballet master) of the Paris Opera Ballet from 1887 to 1907.

== Life ==
Ballet director at the Théâtre de la Monnaie in Brussels from 1865 à 1871, he was its ballet master from 1871 to 1875, putting on the first production of Coppélia on 29 November 1871. He held the same role at the Opéra de Paris during the 1875–1876 season. He was in London in 1877–1878, then worked at the Bolshoi Theatre in Moscow from 1879 to 1882, where in 1880 and 1882 he put on his own version of Swan Lake by Tchaikovsky (1880) and directed Russia's first production of Coppélia (1882).

== Original choreography ==
- Une fête nautique (Brussels, 11 January 1870)
- Les Belles de nuit (Brussels, 16 March 1870)
- Les Nations (Brussels, 14 October 1871)
- Les Fleurs animées (Brussels, 4 March 1873)
- La Vision d'Harry (Brussels, 25 December 1877)
- Pierrot macabre (Brussels, 18 March 1886)
- La Tempête by Ambroise Thomas (Paris Opera, 26 June 1889)
- Le Rêve by Léon Gastinel (Paris Opera, 9 June 1890)
- Psyché et l'Amour (Versailles, 1 June 1891)
- La Maladetta by Paul Vidal (Paris Opera, 24 February 1893)
- Fête Russe, arr. by Paul Vidal (Paris Opera, 24 October 1893)
- Les Cygnes (Paris, 5 January 1896)
- L'Étoile by André Wormser (Paris Opera, 31 May 1897)
- La Légende de l'or (Paris, 24 April 1897)
- Danses de Jadis et de Naguère (Paris Opera, 11 November 1900)
- Bacchus, ballet in 3 acts, 5 scenes by Alphonse Duvernoy, libretto by Hansen and Georges Hartmann after a poem by Auguste Mermet (Paris Opera, 26 November 1902)
- La Ronde des saisons by Henri Büsser (Paris Opera, 22 December 1905)
- Le lac des Aulnes by Maréchal (Paris Opera, was finished by Vanara, 25 November 1907)

Preceded by Eugène Chapuis	Ballet Director of the Théâtre de la Monnaie; 1871-1872	Succeeded by Lucien Petipa
Preceded by Lucien Petipa	Ballet Director of the Théâtre de la Monnaie; 1873-1875	Succeeded by Alfred Lamy
Preceded by Alfred Lamy	Ballet Director of the Théâtre de la Monnaie; 1876-1879	Succeeded by Oscar Poigny
Preceded by Louis-Alexandre Mérante	Director of the Ballet l'Opéra de Paris; 1887-1907	Succeeded by Léo Staats

== Bibliography ==
- Guest, Ivor (2006). The Paris Opéra Ballet. Alton, Hampshire: Dance Books. ISBN 9781852731090.
- Pitou, Spire (1990). The Paris Opéra: An Encyclopedia of Operas, Ballets, Composers, and Performers. Growth and Grandeur, 1815–1914. New York: Greenwood Press. ISBN 9780313262180.
- Pritchard, Jane (2008). "The Great Hansen": An Introduction to the Work of Joseph Hansen, a Forgotten European Choreographer of the Late Nineteenth Century, with a Chronology of His Ballets. Dance Research. Winter 2008. Vol. 26 Issue 2. p73. JSTOR 40263996.
- Wild, Nicole (2012). Dictionnaire des théâtres parisiens (1807–1914). Lyon: Symétrie. ISBN 9782914373487. OCLC 826926792.
