= Gaetano Saracco =

Italian choreographer and dancer

Gaetano Saracco (25 April 1856 – 12 February 1922) was an Italian choreographer and dancer. He was baptised at the Santa Maria delle Vigne of Genoa on 25 April 1856 and died in Paris on 12 February 1922.

Saracco was the son of Giuseppe Saracco, a well known mime artist at the Teatro della Pergola of Florence, and Maddalena Balbo. He made his debut in the Teatro Quirino in Rome in 1874. He then worked in Florence, Pisa and Turin, after which he returned to Florence in 1880.

During the season of 1882-1883 Saracco danced at Paris, where he performed the title role of the ballet Excelsior by Luigi Manzotti and Romualdo Marenco. The following season, he performed at La Scala in Milan under the guidance of the famous Enrico Cecchetti.

He toured throughout the United States in 1884. He then spent a year in London at the Alhambra Theatre, where he met and married the singer Emma Davies.

Saracco left London in 1886 in order to become the ballet master at Théâtre Royal de la Monnaie in Brussels, a position he held until 1888. Afterwards, he spent 4 months at the Teatro dell'Opera di Roma in Rome, after which he returned to Brussels in March 1889. He then started travelling between Milan, Monte-Carlo, and Brussels, and also performed at Saint Petersburg, Odessa Moscow, London, and Geneva.

Saracco ended his career in 1916. He died six years later in rue de Trévise, which is located in the 9th arrondissement of Paris. He was laid to rest in the Batignolles Cemetery.

== Choreographies ==
- La Esmeralda (Gênes, 1882)
- Myosotis (Brussels, 11 December 1886)
- Milenka (Brussels, 3 November 1888)
- Le Cœur de Sîtâ (Paris, 16 May 1891)
- La Bella dormente (Milan, 11 March 1896)
- Javotte (Milan 1897)
- Le Chevalier aux fleurs (Paris, 15 May 1897)
- Saffo (Milan 1898)
- Il Carillon (Milan, 4 January 1899)
- Les Deux Pigeons (Brussels, 18 March 1901)
- La Captive (Brussels, 15 April 1902)
- La Korrigane (Brussels, 26 November 1902)
- Lilia (Brussels, 5 March 1903)
- Zannetta (Brussels, 13 November 1904)
- La Sirène (Monte-Carlo, 27 February 1905)
- Au temps jadis (Monte-Carlo, April 1905)
- La Mariska (Monte-Carlo, 28 April 1905)
- Paquita (Monte-Carlo, 27 February 1906)
- La Sniegourka (Monte-Carlo, 20 April 1906)
- Au printemps (Monte-Carlo, 26 January 1907)
- La Poupée (Monte-Carlo, 8 March 1907)
- Louis XIV (Monte-Carlo, 13 March 1907)
- Espada (Monte-Carlo, 15 February 1908)
- Le Tzar (Monte-Carlo, April 1908)
- Vers l'azur (Geneva, September 1908)
- L'Horloge (Lucerne, October 1908)
- La Fée au bois (Maisons-Laffitte, 27 July 1911)
- Ballet blanc (Biarritz, 9 August 1911)
- Silène libertin (Biarritz, 27 August 1911)
- Brahma (Maisons-Laffitte, 24 October 1911)
- Une nuit d'Ispahan (Maisons-Laffitte, 28 July 1912)
- Kermesse flamande (Monte-Carlo, December 1912)
- Les Fiançailles and Le Jardin du harem (Deauville, 28 September 1913)
- Divertissement patriotique (Monte-Carlo, 5 May 1916)
