= Hippolyte Monplaisir =

French dancer, choreographer, and ballet master (1821-1877)

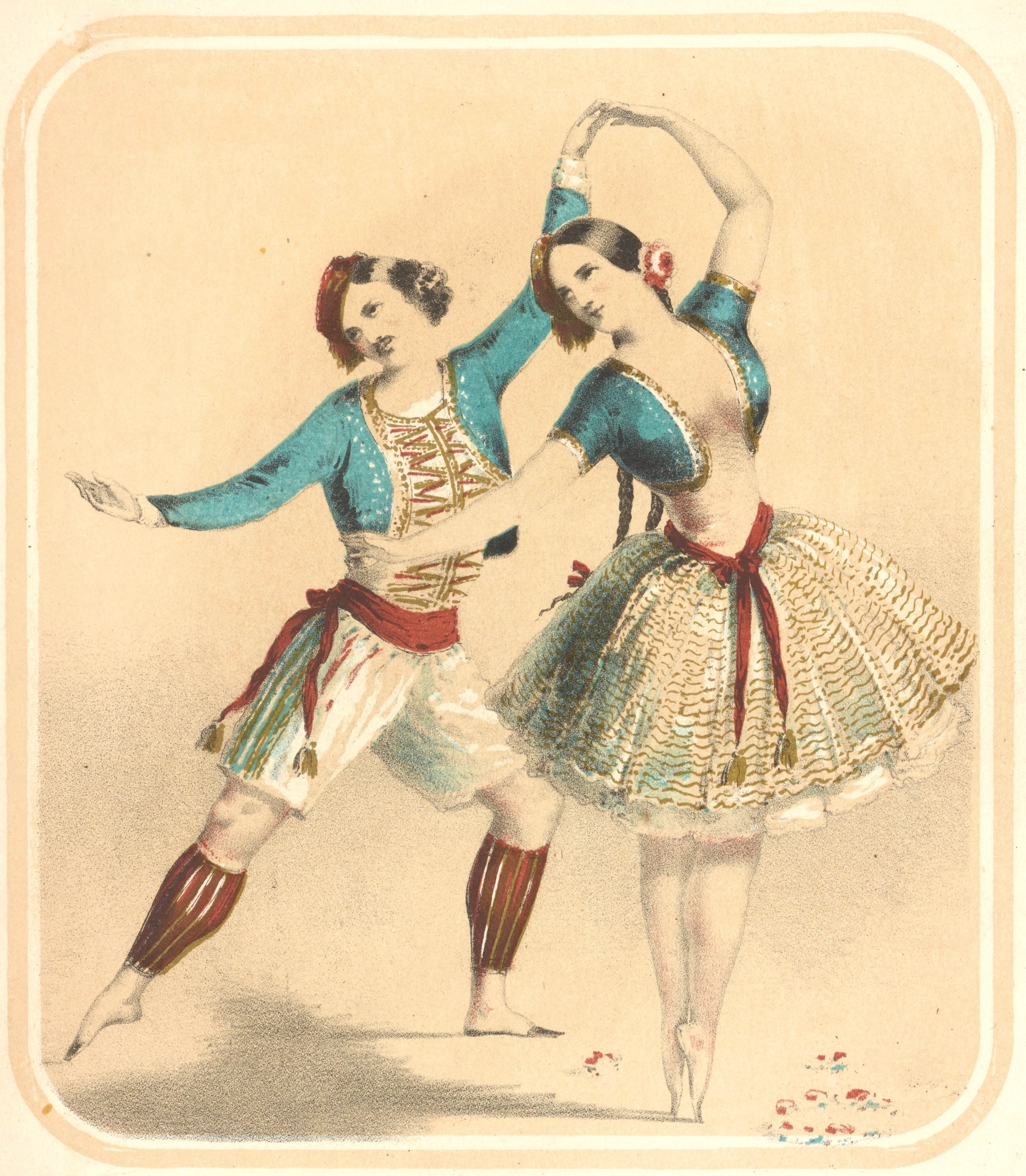
Monplaisir and his wife Adèle Bartholomin performing La Zingarella

Hippolyte Monplaisir (1821, Bordeaux – 10 June 1877, Besana in Brianza) was a French dancer, choreographer and ballet master. He started his studies in Brussels after which he went to Milan to study under the legendary Carlos Blasis. He debuted at La Scala in 1843. His wife, Adèle, was a ballerina. He toured the U.S. performing successful european ballets under his father-in-law, Victor Bartholomin. Monplaisir would later retire as a danseur and chreograph ballets in Lisbon and Milan. In Italy he would create his biggest successes with the aid of Constantino Dall'Argine. His ballets were praised for their use of Prima ballerinas like Amalia Ferraris and Virginia Zucchi.

== Choreographies ==
- Azelia, or the Syrian Slave (Barcelone 1847 - New York, 24 November 1847)
- A Apparição (Lisbonne 1856)
- L'Île des amours (Bordeaux 1860 - Milan 1861 - Rome 1862 - Brussels 1864 - Palerme 1868)
- La Perle de Florence (Bordeaux, 4 April 1861)
- Benvenuto Cellini (Milan, 24 August 1861)
- Nostradamus (Milan, 21 April 1862)
- Tersicore sulla terra (Milan, 24 May 1862)
- Les Filles du feu (Bordeaux 1864)
- Melina (Rome 1864)
- Crisforo Colombo (Rome 1864 - Turin 1865 - Florence 1872)
- La Fête des voiles (Brussels, 5 September 1864)
- Les Nations (Brussels, 18 September 1864)
- Ka-In-Ka-A (Brussels, 28 May 1865)
- La Devâdâcy (Milan, 27 October 1866 - Florence 1867 - Turin 1870)
- Estella (Milan 1866 - Florence 1867 - Naples 1870)
- La Camargo (Milan, 11 January 1868 - Turin, 14 February 1871 - Venise 1871)
- Brahma (Milan, 25 February 1868 - Madrid 1873 - Palerme 1874 - Vienna 1875 - Gênes 1876)
- La Semiramide del Nord (Milan, 2 January 1869 - Turin, 26 décembre 1869 - Bologne 1871 - Turin 1873 - Florence 1874)
- Tra la veglia ed i sogni (Milan, 16 February 1869)
- La Regina della notte (Turin 1869 - Milan 1870)
- Les Figlie di Chèope (Milan, 31 December 1871 - Florence 1875 - Trieste 1875 - Turin, 3 January 1877)
- La Sirena (Milan, 9 March 1872)
- L'Almèa (Naples 1872)
- Giulio Cesare (Milan, 26 December 1874)
- Lore-Ley (Milan, 4 January 1877)

Preceded by Henri Justamant	Director of Ballet of Théâtre royal de la Monnaie; 1864–1865	Succeeded by Vincent (dancer)
