= Mademoiselle Fleury =

Belgian actress (1766–1818)

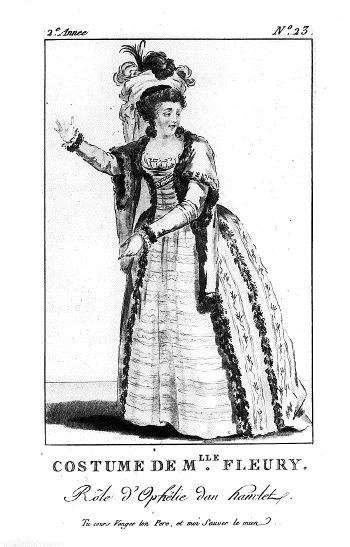
- Born: 28 December 1766; Antwerp
- Died: 23 February 1818 (aged 51); Orly
- Occupation: Actress

Marie-Anne-Florence Bernardy-Nones (28 December 1766, Antwerp - 23 February 1818, Orly), known as Mademoiselle Fleury (Miss Fleury), was an actress active in France.

Her father (Louis-Joseph Nones, known as Fleury) and mother (Marie-Anne-Denise Bernardy, daughter of Charles Bernardy) were comic actors in the provinces who often appeared in the Austrian Netherlands.

Mademoiselle Fleury débuted at the Comédie-Française on 21 January 1786 and was received into the company on 23 October. She became a sociétaire in 1791 and retired in 1807.
