= Jean-Baptiste Roucourt =

Jean-Baptiste Roucourt (Brussels, 28 October 1780 - Brussels, 1 May 1849) was a music pedagogue, singer and composer. He founded the music school which was the cradle of the Royal Conservatoire of Brussels.

== Early life (1780-1812) ==
Jean-Baptiste Roucourt was born in Brussels in the Austrian Netherlands. His father François Roucourt was from Diest and his mother Catherine Barbe Bormans from Gingelom in the Bishopric of Liège, but they lived in Brussels, near the Treurenberg, by the time of Jean-Baptiste's birth. The household counted at least two older children, Catherine Henriette and Louis. Jean-Baptiste was baptized at the Church of St. Michael and St. Gudula on the day of his birth.

In his early childhood, he had music education from Adrien-Joseph Van Helmont, who had succeeded his father Charles-Joseph as music master at the Church of St. Michael and St. Gudula in 1777. However, Van Helmont junior being also employed as a singer at the royal chapel since the same year, and Van Helmont senior having declared in his resignation letter that he would keep the pay and the duties as a music master as long as his health allowed him to (this was a normal way to ensure one's retirement allowance at the time), it is likely that young Jean-Baptiste received lessons from Charles-Joseph Van Helmont as well, until Van Helmont in 1790.

The occupation of the Netherlands by Napoleon caused church music formations to be shut down from 1792 onward, so that music training, if any at all, existed only as individual private initiatives. Jean-Baptiste's teenage years were marked by revolutionary wars in 1794 between the French occupant and the Austrian emperor, and revolutionary campaigns in 1794 and 1796 where art works from shut churches and monasteries were sent to Paris or destroyed, so as to centralize the art sector, for visual arts at the Couvent des Petits-Augustins as of 1790, and for music at the Conservatoire of Paris from 1795 on.

Jean-Baptiste entered the Conservatoire in February 1802. There, he learned singing with Vincenzo Fiocchi and Charles-Henri Plantade, and some sources also make him a pupil of the legendary Pierre-Jean Garat. After losing his father in 1805 and his mother in 1808, Jean-Baptiste made a living teaching and composing. His song album Six romances, dedicated to Ms. de Néverlée, was published in 1808 by Pleyel in Paris, which suggests he stayed there for a while after graduating.

== Roucourt's music school (1812-1830) ==
Roucourts most important achievement was the music school he opened in October 1813 with funding from the city of Brussels.

Music education having been disrupted considerably under the French Revolution, many initiatives were taken in the early 19th century to build it up anew. New pedagogical methods of Lancaster (1798), Choron (1816) and Galin (1818) were introduced and developed in the empire and under the Restoration, and from 1806 on the Conservatoire of Paris was extended with succursales, free singing and acting schools for talented young people who did not have the means for private tuition. In the Low Countries, where no Conservatoire-like, secular music school existed, Roucourt was a pioneer when in 1812 he sought permission to open such a succursale in Brussels. He also was made corresponding member of the Music Academy within the Association of Fine Arts and Literature of Ghent, created the same year. In his wake, other music schools were founded in Brussels: in 1816 by Joseph-Henri Mees and François-Joseph Snel based on the methods of Choron and Galin, in 1821 a music school by Snel following the method of Massimino and of mutual tuition, and also in 1821 a singing school by Le Camus based on the method of Wilhem.

Roucourts school, named Ecole de chant et d'art dramatique and located in the palace of Charles of Lorraine, started off with himself as a voice teacher and rector, and Adrien-Joseph Van Helmont as a music theory teacher, for around 20 students. The pedagogy of the school was based on the method of mutual tuition, where the most advanced students monitor groups of beginners and the teacher only teaches the monitors, thus allowing mass schooling at lower cost. In 1820 Roucourt published a teaching method with vocal exercises, Essai sur la théorie du chant, in which he recommended mutual tuition for singing. This method would later be criticized by Fétis.

When the allied forces marched into Brussels halfway the first school year, the school lost two-thirds of its students, but it stayed in place under the United Kingdom of the Netherlands. Even though Roucourts service was not remunerated during the first three years, it was a continuous struggle to obtain funds from the city; it seems the funding was interrupted between 1818 and 1820.

In 1825, the Dutch government decided to invest in music education and to establish four music institutions in the kingdom: two in the Northern Netherlands (in The Hague and in Amsterdam) and two in the Southern Netherlands (in Liège and Brussels). For Brussels, The Hague chose to merge Roucourts school with a violin class which Nicolas-Lambert Wéry had started one year earlier, and to subsidize it; this de facto extended the singing school with a strings department. Roucourt gratefully composed a sacred cantata for the wedding of the Prince of Nassau, which was performed in the city hall of Brussels on July 13, 1825. Also, his song L'exilé, written for the benefit of the victims of the 1825 flood in the Netherlands, may have been a gesture towards the Dutch. His school was officially made a royal school of music in 1826 and was moved to the Palais Granvelle (where now the Ravensteyn gallery is) in 1827. This development allowed for it to be extended with several classes; notably, the advice of Anton Reicha was solicited for the recruitment of a composition teacher, leading to the appointment of Charles Louis Hanssens. By 1828, the funding formerly granted by the city of Brussels has been replaced and increased by the Regency of Brussels, even more classes had opened and the number of students had reached around 120. Roucourt however by this operation lost his position and pay as a rector, to become a simple teacher in an institution administrated by a commission accountable to The Hague. One of the Dutch demands was that the lessons should be in Dutch language, but this was never achieved; Van Helmont and Borremans were Flemish and Roucourt was Flemish too but French-schooled, but many other teachers were French-speaking (like Wéry) or French (like Platel).

Following the Belgian Revolution in August 1830, the royal decree, which established the 'royal' school, was void, and the better part of the staff left the city, so classes were suspended for school year 1830-1831. The classrooms were occupied by a drawing academy and the furniture and effects of the school were temporarily stored in a mansion of the prince of Chimay, who had been a supporter of the school and particularly of Wéry. Despite endeavours of Roucourt and Wéry to resume lessons in the next year, it took the government and the new burgomaster Rouppe until November 1831 to decide that the school was to be replaced by a different institution. Roucourt was honorably dismissed, Hanssens, who had compromised himself during the Revolution, moved to Paris and Van Helmont had died at the end of 1830; apart from those three, the entire staff was re-employed in the Royal Conservatoire of Brussels which was established in 1832.

== Later life (1830-1849) ==
Unlike Adrien-Joseph Van Helmont, who was a free-mason and notoriously patriotic, Jean-Baptiste Roucourt was not outspoken in his political views. Nonetheless, his favors to the Dutch crown sufficed to cause his dismissal, albeit honorably, after the Belgian independence, even though he did not personally benefit from such favors since he was denied the title and corresponding treatment of an honorary rector in 1827.

After his school was closed, Jean-Baptiste Roucourt disappeared from public life. He was in his early fifties and father of two young children, Anne Louise Flore born in 1829 and Louis Edouard in 1833, whom he had had with Thérèse Mathilde Dept. In 1835, he lived in rue Notre-Dame-aux-Neiges, in a neighborhood (roughly nowadays Libertés) which at that time was overpopulated and had a bad reputation.

He died on May 1, 1849, in rue de l’Arbre 19, was buried two days later in Saint-Josse-ten-Noode but the funeral took place only on May 10, in Saint-Mary church in Schaerbeek.

== Works ==
Jean-Baptiste Roucourt composed exclusively vocal music, especially 'romances'. 'Romances' were a light genre of strophic monody which had been popular in France since around 1750, and remained the main song style until the more serious 'Lied' infiltrated from Germany around 1830.

No catalogue of Roucourts works exists and his compositions are not numbered and rarely dated. This is a non-exhaustive list of works:

=== Romances ===
- Romance du maréchal de Saxe sur la mort de Mademoiselle Lecouvreur. Dedicated to Ms. Boscary de Villeplaine (before 1808/9)
- Six romances avec accompagnement de piano ou harpe (1808)
  Jean-Baptiste Roucourt, Six romances, no. 5
- Romance d’Alfred (1815)
- Les deux soeurs de la charité (before 1822)
  Jean-Baptiste Roucourt, Les deux soeurs de la charité
- L’Exilé (1825)
- Le secret de ma vie. Dedicated to Ms. Boscary de Villeplaine
- La solitude (romance). Dedicated to Ms. Lenoble
- Trois romances. Dedicated to Mr. Plantade
- Le bon troubadour. Dedicated to Countess du Taillis
- La fauvette. Dedicated to Ms. Boscary
- Zoé ou la provençale
- Plaisir et tourment
- Le rendez-vous du matin
- La tombe du pauvre
- Il est parti. Bollero
- Chanson comme une autre.
- Souvenirs du soir.
- Le départ
- Suite du bon troubadour.
- Les œillets, mélodie avec accompagnement de lyre ou de guitare

=== Sacred works ===
- Ave verum. for 4-part chorus
- 2 Benedictus. for 4-part chorus
- O salutaris. for 4-part chorus
- Salve regina. for 4-part chorus
- Ave Maria. for soprano solo
- Ecce panis. for tenor solo
- Verbum caro. cantata for bass solo with chorus and orchestra, composed for the wedding of the Prince of Nassau (1825)
