= Charles Laffillé =

French composer, poet, theatre manager and music publisher

Charles Laffilée
- Born: Charles François Marie Laffillé; 30 September 1771; Saint-Valery-sur-Somme
- Died: 16 April 1848 (aged 76); Paris
- Occupations: Composer; Music publisher
- Years active: 1822–1825 (as editor)

Charles François Marie Laffillé (30 September 1771 – 16 April 1848) was a 19th-century French composer, poet, theatre manager and music publisher.

The son of a bailiff of the Duke of Orléans, Laffillé was tax collector of the "domaines" in Brussels during 12 years (1798–1810) before he returned to Paris where he published collections of romances and established a music publishing company.

In 1831, he was director of the Théâtre de la Monnaie in Brussels during at least one year but was forced to file for bankruptcy. Back in Paris, he continued to publish.

== Some works ==
- Le Souvenir des ménestrels, contenant une collection de romances inédites, Paris, 1813–1828, 16 vol.
- La Fête de l'hymen, ronde pastorale, Paris, Dentu, 1816
- Chants français, Paris, Delaunay et Dentu, 1829
- La Prise d'Alger, poème, Paris, Delaunay et Gosselin, 1834

Preceded by Joseph Langle	director of the Théâtre royal de la Monnaie; 1821–1832	Succeeded by Claude-Charles Cartigny
