= Romualdo Marenco =

Italian composer

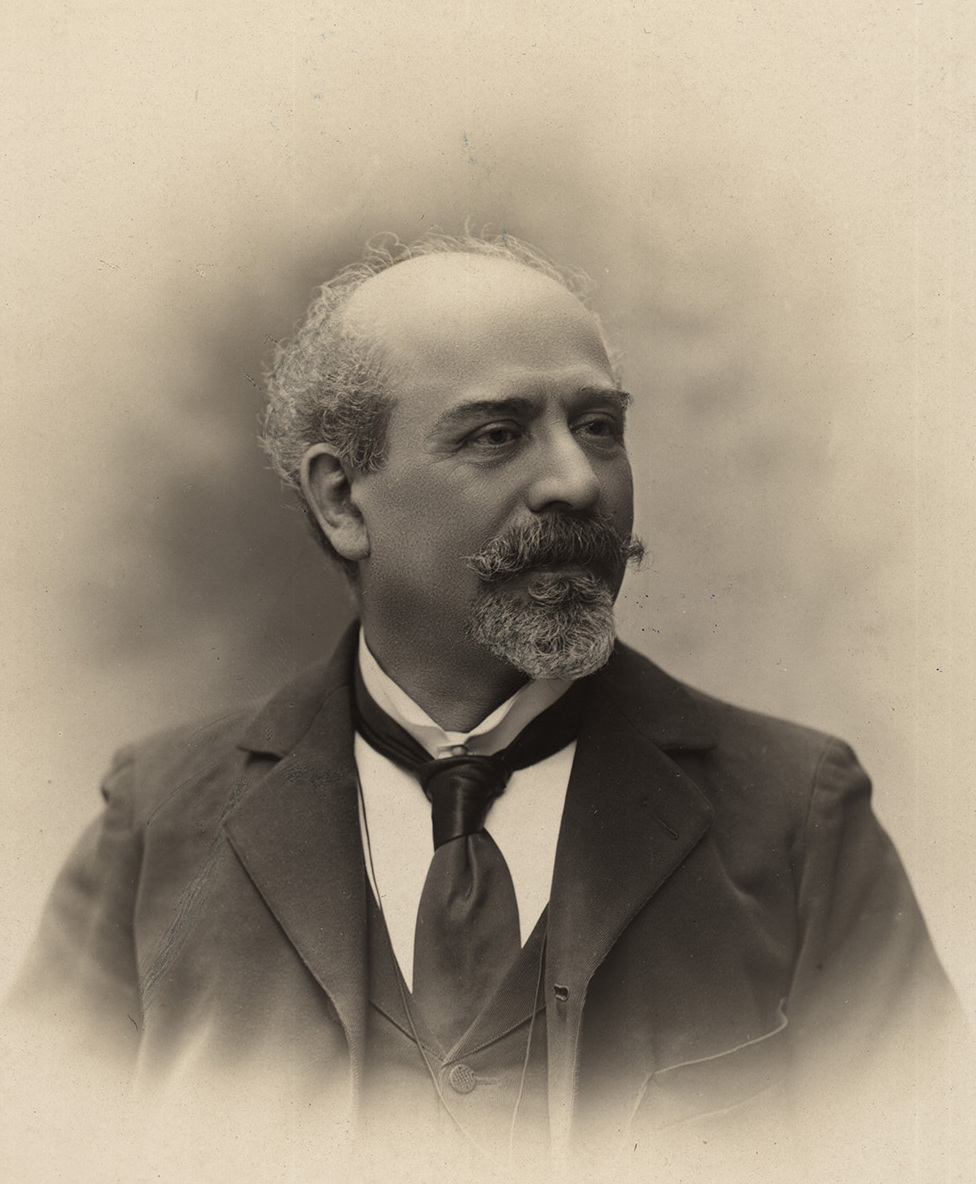
Romualdo Marenco

Romualdo Marenco (March 1, 1841 – October 9, 1907) was an Italian composer primarily noted for ballet music. Marenco started his musical career as a violinist in the Doria Theater in Genoa. His first composition was the ballet Garibaldi's Landing in Marsala. He was appointed the orchestral conductor for La Scala in Milan and also directed the ballet company there for seven years. His best-known ballets were written in collaboration with choreographer Luigi Manzotti during that period.

Marenco is best remembered for the ballet Excelsior, composed in 1881. Excelsior is a tribute to the scientific and industrial progress of the 19th century, from the electric light to the telegraph, steam engine, Fréjus Rail Tunnel, and Suez Canal. As such it foreshadows the Futurism movement. In the first nine months, it was staged 100 times in Italy and abroad. It is still performed and was recently (2002) staged in Milan.

== Works ==
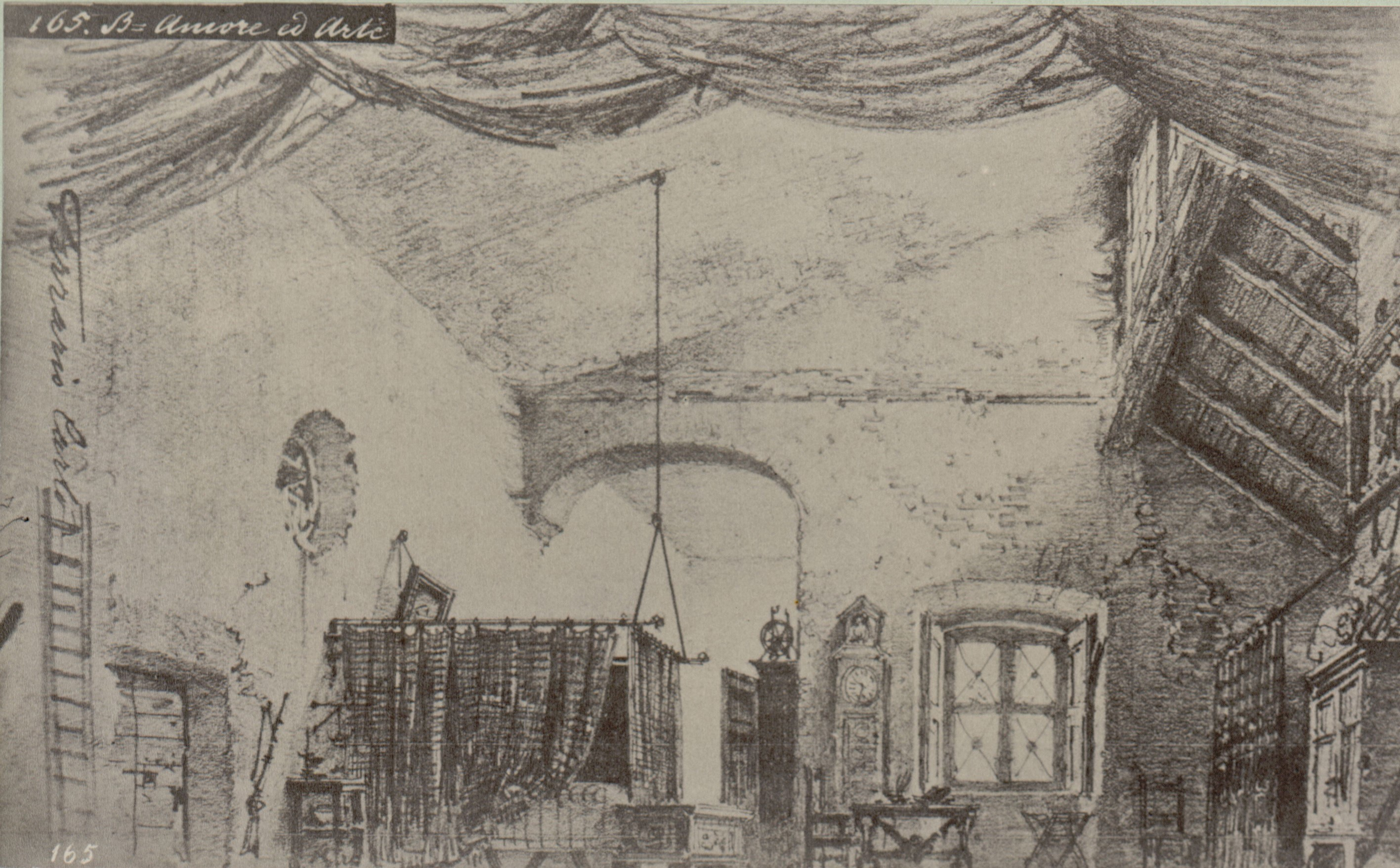
Modesta camera in casa dell'affittaiolo Rienzi, set design for Amore ed Arte act 2 scene 2

(1870).

=== Opera ===
- Lorenzino de' Medici (Libretto by G. Perosio, Lodi 1874)
- I Moncalda (Libretto by Fulgi, Milan 1880)
- Federico Struensée (Novi Ligure 1908)

=== Operetta ===
- Le Diable au corps (Libr. E. Blum and P. Toché, Paris 1884)
- Strategia d'amore (Libr. C. A. Blengi, Milan 1896)

=== Ballet ===
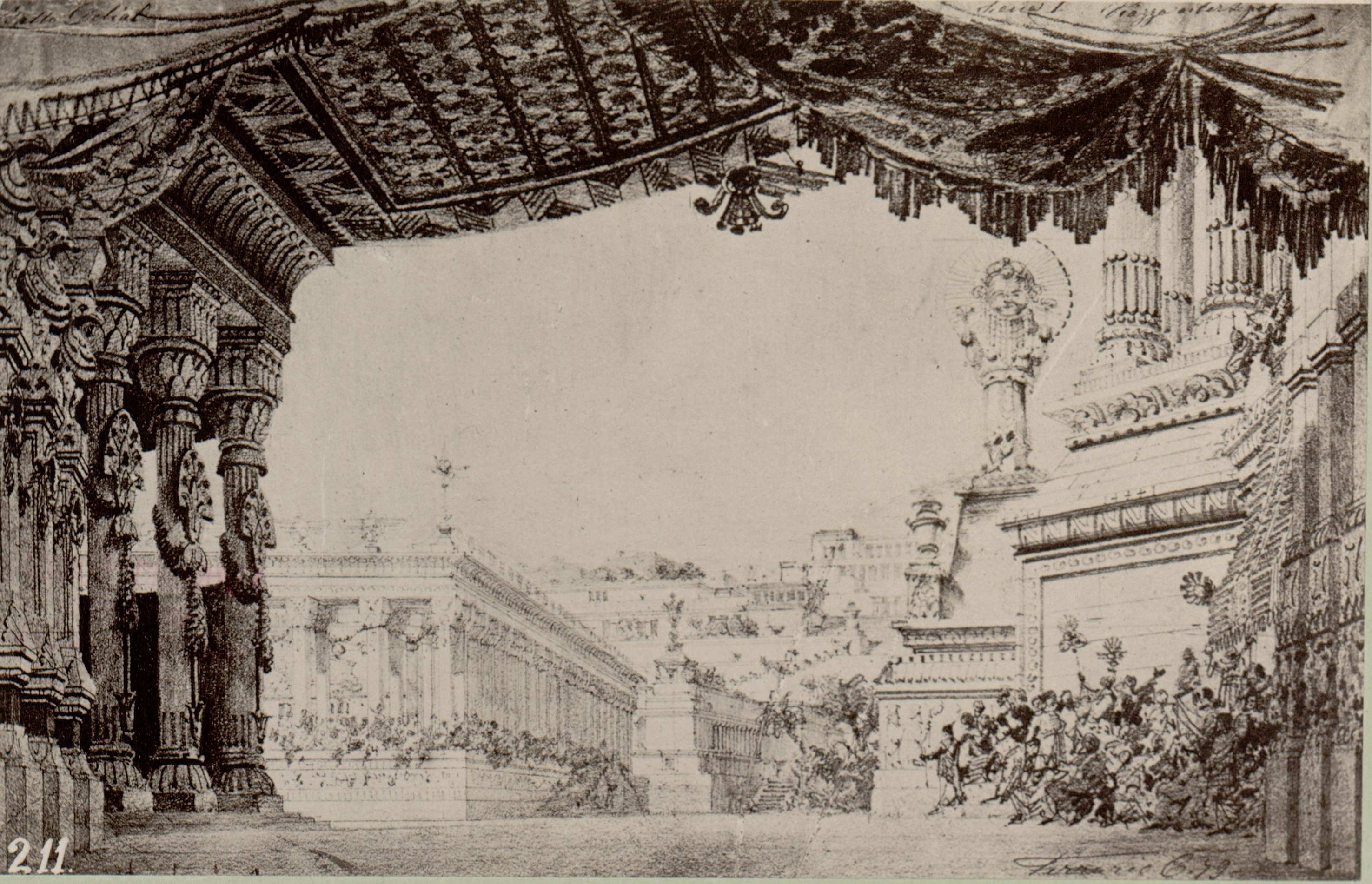
Piazza del Tempio del Sole in Persepoli, set design for Delial act 1 scene 1 (1880).

- Garibaldi's Landing in Marsala (choreog. Pretesi, Milan 1868)
- Amore e Arte (Milan, La Scala 1869)
- Bianca di Nevers (Milan, La Scala 1872)
- The Seven Deadly Sins (Milan, La Scala 1873)
- Tempatation (retitled: Ermanzia, Milan, La Scala 1874)
- Sieba (Turin, 1878)
- Delial ( Milan, La Scala 1880)
- Excelsior (Milan, La Scala 1881)
- Dai Natha (Milan, La Scala 1882)
- L'astro di Afgan (Milan, La Scala 1883)
- Amor (Milan, La Scala 1886)
- Hannibal (Milan, Teatro Dal Verme 1888)
- Teadora (Milan, La Scala 1889)
- Day-Sin (Milan, La Scala 1891)
- Sport (Milan, La Scala 1897)
- Eureka (Milan, La Scala 1901)
- Bacco and Gambrinus (Milan, La Scala 1904)
- Light (Milan, La Scala 1905)

=== Other works ===
- Two symphonies
- Inaugural March for the Turin Exposition
- Bella Elvezia, polka for pianoforte
- Hymn to Ticino (Lugano 1899)
