= Antoine Pitrot =

French ballet dancer and choreographer

Antoine-Bonaventure Pitrot (31 March 1727, in Marseille – after 1792), known as Pitrot aîné (Pitrot the elder), was a French dancer, choreographer and ballet master. He was the elder brother of Jean-Baptiste Pitrot, and their father Barthélemy Pitrot was an actor who criss-crossed the French provinces in the first half of the 18th century.

Antoine Pitrot began his career at the Opéra de Paris in 1744 and then as ballet-master at the Théâtre-Italien. He pursued a brilliant career, appearing across Europe and in the Russian Empire, and composed several ballets. He is considered one of the precursors of Paris's 'ballet d'action'.
