= Jean-Baptiste Pitrot =

French dancer and balletmaster

Jean-Baptiste Pitrot (22 May 1729, Bordeaux - 4 January 1809, Brussels), called Pitrot cadet (Pitrot the younger) to distinguish him from his elder brother Antoine, was a French dancer and balletmaster. His father, Barthélemy Pitrot, was a French actor and dancer who criss-crossed the French provinces and the Southern Netherlands in the first half of the 18th century.

== Life ==
He began his career before 1748 at the Théâtre-Italien in Paris. He was widely noted in a production of L'Opérateur chinois, a ballet by Jean-Baptiste Dehesse, from 11 January 1749 onwards. He also put on the premiere of Les Tartares at the same theater on 14 August 1755.

The directors of the Théâtre de la Monnaie in Brussels, D'Hannetaire and Gourville, summoned him to join their company in 1756. Pitrot next danced at Lille in 1758, and was then co-director of the theatre at Ghent from 1758 to 1759, returning to the Comédie-Italienne in 1759. He then obtained authorisation for putting on shows in Liège in 1760, and returned to Lille in 1761 and Ghent in 1762. On 7 May 1762, Pitrot made his début at The Hague as lead dancer and ballet master. He put on one success after another - Les Chasseurs, Le Vieillard rajeuni, Le Tailleur, Les Tonneliers allemands and Le Brouetteur italien.

After a long absence, Pitrot returned to Brussels in 1771 as ballet master, engaged by the directors Ignaz Vitzthumb and Louis Compain. After another absence, he again returned to Brussels in 1784, and there married a young girl 31 years his junior (with whom he had one son called Antoine, who later had a career as a magistrate).

There was now little chance of these offers meeting with success, for he was by then 76 years old, and he died shortly afterwards at the Grand Hospice in Brussels.
