= Champmêlé =

18th-century French actor and theatre manager

- Born: Jean-François Cussy; 28 October 1745; Secqueville-en-Bessin (Calvados)
- Died: 9 July 1806 (aged 60); Brussels
- Occupations: Actor; Theatre manager

Jean-François Cussy, better known as Champmêlé, (28 October 1745 – 9 July 1806) was an 18th-century French actor and theatre manager.

A lawyer by the Parlement of Paris, he seems to have entered the theatrical career in Normandy in his late twenties, probably leading a small touring company. He played in Calais in 1774, and in Bordeaux in 1782. He then made a trial at the Comédie-Française 7 September 1785 in Le Cid by Corneille and probably was not accepted.

Engaged at the Théâtre de la Monnaie in Brussels for the 1786–1787 season, he played kings and noble fathers. In 1789, he married a woman from Brussels who did not belong to the world of theater.

Hired by the Comédie-Italienne in Paris, he made his debut 25 October 1791 in La Fausse Magie by Marmontel and Grétry, and in Blaise et Babet by Monvel and Dezède.

Afterwards, Champmêlé was director of the Théâtre de la Monnaie in 1794–1795, then in 1798–1799 in association with Marc d'Oberny. He kept on acting until his death to the satisfaction of the public who appreciated him a lot.
