= Luigi Manzotti =

Italian mime dancer and choreographer

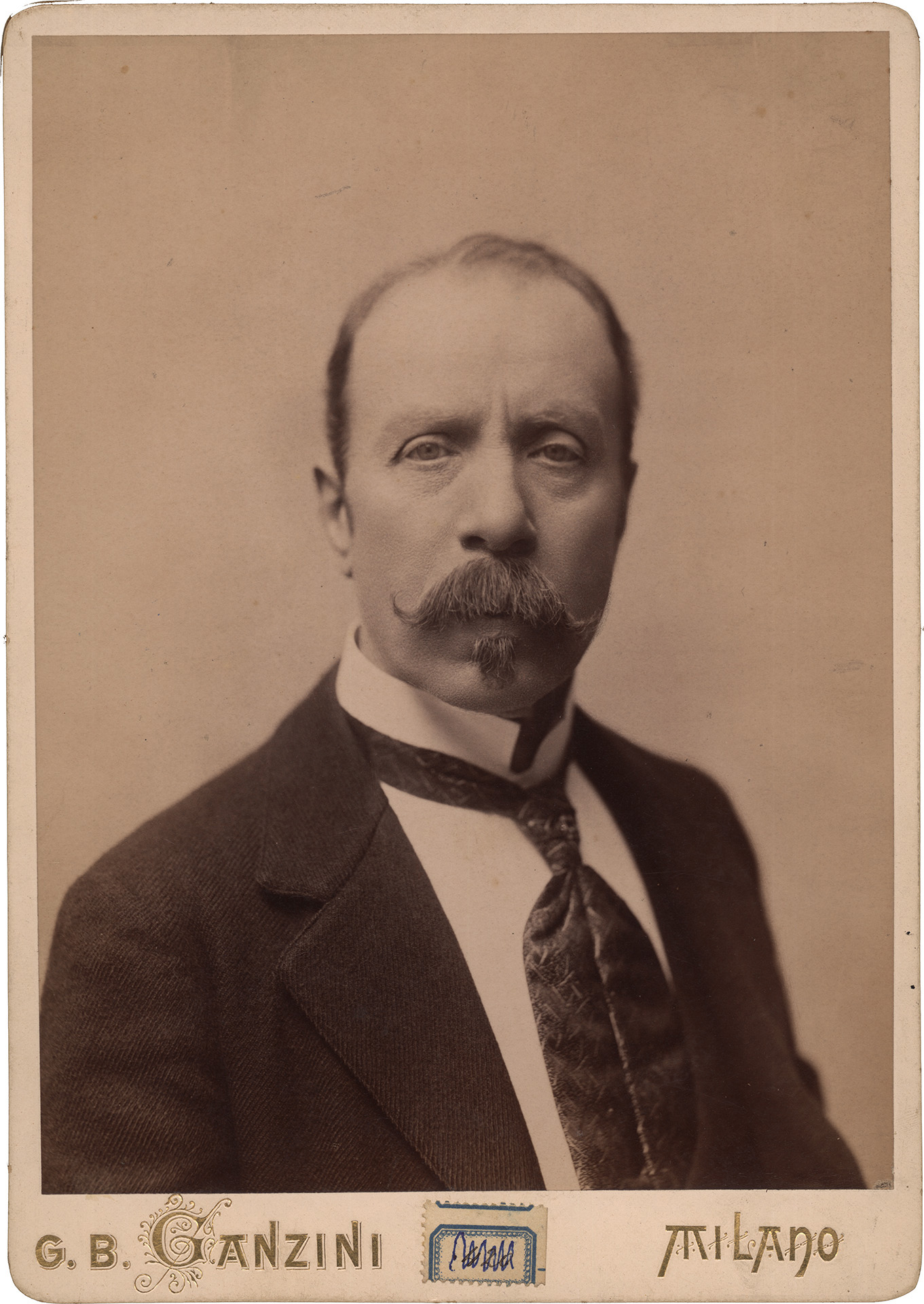
Manzotti before 1878

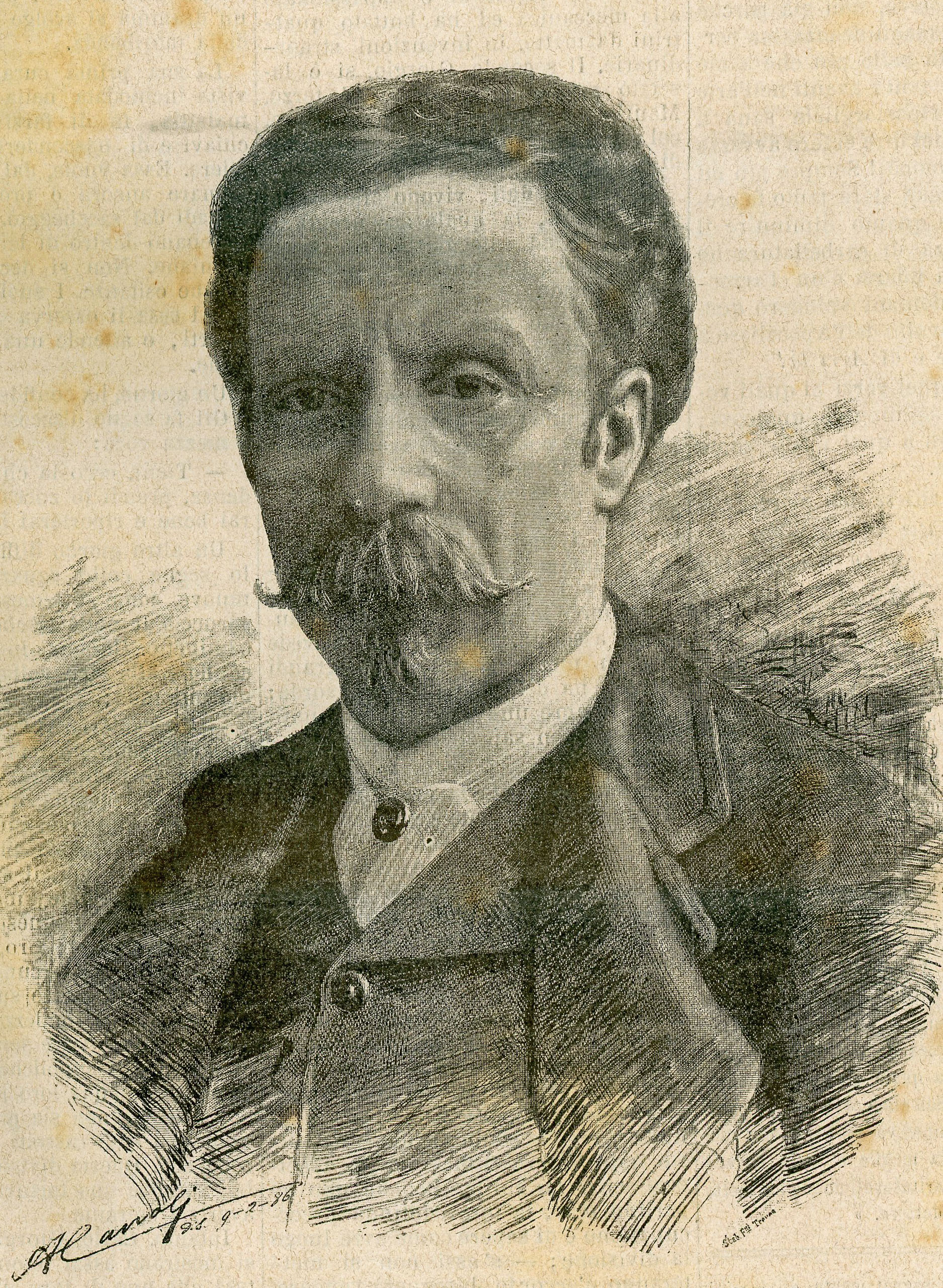
1886 portrait

Luigi Manzotti (2 February 1835 – 15 March 1905) was an Italian mime dancer and choreographer.

Born in Milan, Manzotti created his first ballet in 1858, and his subsequent productions were performed around the world. Today, he is best remembered for his choreography of the ballet Excelsior (1881), music by Romualdo Marenco.
