= Charles Borremans =

Belgian musician

Charles Borremans (5 April 1769 – 17 July 1827), was a composer of operas, and a violinist and conductor at the Théâtre Royal de la Monnaie in what was then France and later the United Kingdom of the Netherlands from 1804 to 1825. The composer Charles-Louis-Joseph Hanssens succeeded him as conductor of this opera house.

Borremans was born and died in Brussels. The Borremans family was related to the Artot family: his sister was married to Maurice Artot, father of the famous violinist Joseph-Alexander Artot.

A Quatuor for the pianoforte harpsichord or with accompaniment of bass and two violones in F, of which a part is missing, is mentioned as number 476 in the inventory of the archives of the House of Arenberg at Edingen.
