= Namouna =

Namouna may refer to

- Alfred de Musset's 1831 collections of poem Namouna
- A 1882 ballet with music by Lalo and choreography by Petipa.
- James Gordon Bennett, Jr.'s 1882 845-ton steamyacht Namouna
- Alexei Ratmansky's 2010 ballet
