= List of San Francisco Ballet 2013 repertory =

San Francisco Ballet dances each year at the War Memorial Opera House, San Francisco, and tours; this is the list of ballets with casts for the 2013 season beginning with the gala, Thursday, January 24, 2013, The Nutcracker is danced the year before.

== Program one, January 29 – February 1 Mixed program ==
- Suite en Blanc
- In the Night
- Borderlands

== Program two, February 13 – February 19 Full-Length ==
- Nijinsky (Danced by Hamburg Ballet)

== Program three, February 26 – March 10 Mixed program ==
- Beaux
- Guide to Strange Places
- Possokhov's The Rite of Spring

== Program four, March 1 – March 9 Mixed program ==
- From Foreign Lands, an Alexei Ratmansky world premiere
- Within the Golden Hour
- Scotch Symphony

== Program five, March 21 - March 28 Full length ==
- Onegin

== Program six, April 9 - April 20 Mixed program ==
- Raymonda - Act III
- Ibsen's House
- Symphonic Dances

== Program seven, April 11 - April 21 Mixed program ==
- Criss-Cross
- Francesca da Rimini
- Symphony in Three Movements

== Program eight, May 3 - May 12 Full-length ==
- Cinderella, by Christopher Wheeldon
