= Suite en Blanc =

Ballet by Serge Lifar

Suite en Blanc, later retitled Noir et Blanc, is a ballet choreographed by Serge Lifar to music from Édouard Lalo's ballet Namouna. The first performance, by the Paris Opera Ballet, took place on 19 June 1943 in Zurich. It was an abstract neo-classical ballet produced during the German Occupation of France. The original costumes were all white, whence the title ("Suite in White"), but in subsequent productions the male dancers wore black and the title was changed to reflect this ("Black and White").

== Sources ==
- The Oxford Dictionary of Dance (p.431), Debra Craine, Judith Mackrell, 2nd ed 2010 ISBN 9780199563449]
