= Namouna (Lalo ballet) =

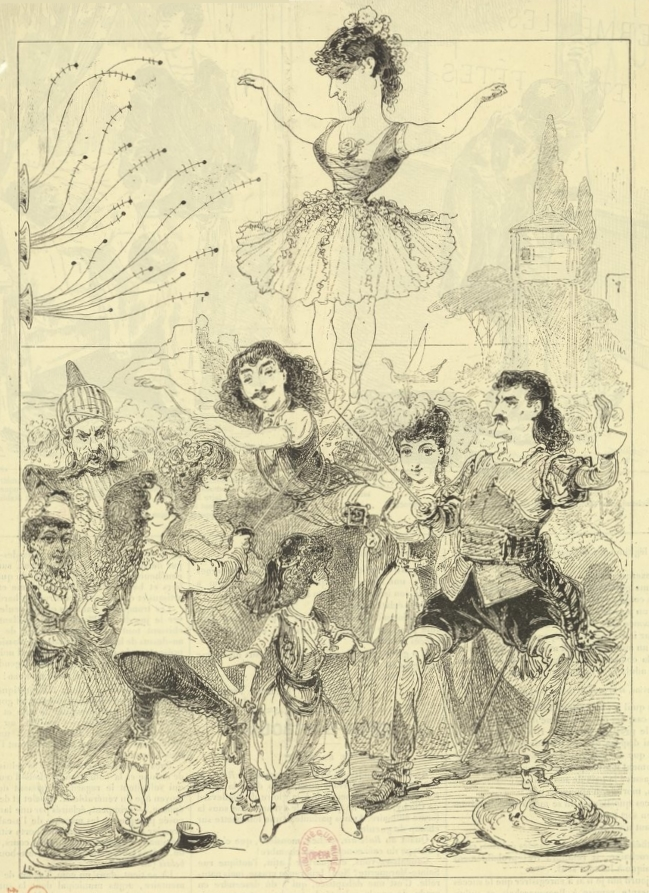
Cartoon by Stop: Namouna, ballet archipelliculaire...

Namouna is a ballet in two acts and three scenes, with music by Edouard Lalo, choreographed by Lucien Petipa and premiered in Paris in 1882.

== Background ==
The basis of the ballet's scenario, by Charles Nuitter and Lucien Petipa are part of Casanova's Mémoires de Jacques Casanova (the two-act opera by Bizet to a libretto by Louis Gallet, originally to be entitled Namouna begun in 1871 was based on the work of the same name by Musset, but which was changed to Djamileh.)

By the time of the commission from the Opéra, Lalo had been labelled as a symphonist due to his experience as a chamber music viola player and the majority of works he had completed up to then. Vaucorbeil, director of the Opéra, gave him a scenario for a ballet adapted by Blaze de Bury from the Mémoires of Casanova, leaving him little time for the composition. On 10 December 1881 Lalo suffered a hemiplegic attack and was asked by Vaucorbeil to submit the unfinished score, but a dispute with the Lalo family was avoided when Gounod and others stepped in to help finish score it. The premiere was at the Théâtre de l'Opéra, Paris, on 6 March 1882. The Danse de Namouna in act 2, through its flute solo, was dedicated to Paul Taffanel.

The ballet was first seen at the Théâtre de l'Opéra, Paris, on 6 March 1882 on a bill following a performance of Le Comte Ory. The original scenery was credited to Rube, Chaperon, and J. B. Lavastre, with costumes by Eugène Lacoste. A pastel Ballet Scene (c1887-90) by Degas is believed to be based on an ensemble scene in act 2 of the ballet.

In 1886 the premiere production of Messager's Les Deux Pigeons re-used stage designs and sets from Namouna. A revival with new choreography by Léo Staats happened at the Opéra in 1908, and his version was revised by Albert Aveline for a production in 1935.Later, Serge Lifar used much of the score for his ballet Suite en blanc (1943), retaining the titles of movements from the original score.

== Roles ==
Role	Premiere Cast
Namouna	Rita Sangalli
Don Ottavio	Louis Mérante
Adriani	Pluque
Ali	Cornet
Andriquès	Alice Biot
Kitzos	Ajas
Iotis	Julia Subra
Hélène	Mlle. Invernizzi
Khainitza	Mlle. Mercédès

== Synopsis ==
The ballet takes place in the 17th century.

Act I, Scene 1 is set in a casino hall in Corfu, a starry night. Count Ottavio is gambling with Lord Adriani, who having lost money, stakes his ship, but then loses again. He gets one of his men to bring his slave Namouna, and offers her against everything he has lost. She pleads him not to do this but he refuses. Ottavio declines this stake, the game goes ahead and Adriani loses. Ottavio approaches Namouna and offers her the ship and money he won. She is grateful and kisses Ottavio's hand, gives him half a posy she has and leaves with Adriani's men, attended by Andriquès. All praise Ottavio for his chivalrous act, and as the ship moves off Adriani is overwhelmed by these events.

Act 1. Scene II, is a square in Corfu with the ocean in the background to the right a palace, and on the left an inn with a terrace; dawn. Musicians are serenading Hélène, Ottavio's beloved. Count Ottavio pays them and woos Helene. Adriani enters and strikes the musicians with his sword, sparking a fight with Ottavio. A veiled woman comes in and dances in between them offering flowers as the square fills with people. The duel ceases and the musicians come back, complaining to Ottavio, who further pays them off. Festive dances take place, and Hélène returns to her balcony, but when a veiled woman (Namouna) dances before Ottavio who is attracted and joins here in dance, to the fury of Hélène. As the other dancers leave, Ottavio espies Hélène going out with a servant, and proffers her his arm. Adriani comes back declares his love for Namouna, who responds by declaring her love for Ottavio, who freed her from slavery. The raging Adriani summons bandits, planning to attack Ottavio again. Namouna overhears him and gives instructions to Andriquès. As Ottavio escorts Helene back home, he breathes the scent of the flowers which Namouna gave him. Trying to leave his way barred, but some mariners called on by Andriquès come to help him and the ruffians retire in disorder. When Ottavio thanks the sailors they courteously take his sword and invite him to board their ship. More general dances close the act.

Act II. An island, belonging to a rich slave-dealer, Ali. The most attractive of the slaves, Iotis, reproaches her companions for their laziness as Ali arrives and is received with obeisances, apart from Iotis who refuses to bow, until she is forced to calm Ali's wrath. Dances are followed by the arrival of Ottavio, Namouna, and Andriquès. Ali, thinking of business, asks Ottavio to stay and refresh himself, and the Count follows the dealer as Namouna takes her veil away, revealing herself. She then orders that gold and jewels be brought, and buys all the slaves; her former companions remove their veils and dance then, at her request, leave. Ottavio realizes that Namouna brought him to the island out of affection and women return offering flowers to the happy pair. But Andriquès enters to announce the arrival of Adriani and his men. While Ottavio wants to fight them, Namouna leads him and the women off. Adriani posts guards as he is aware of a woman dancing followed by others. The bandits drop their weapons and join in the dance. Suddenly each bandit is threatened by two women, who have grabbed the discarded weapons. Namouna shows Adriani the success of the attack but Ottavio has been caught and Adriani refuses to free him. Namouna then orders her friends to serve the pirates with wine, and herself tends to Adriani. She repeatedly fills his cup until he becomes overcome. Namouna now frees Ottavio who throws money at the bandits, and Namouna, Andriquès and he run back to board their ship. Adriani realizes what has happened; he draws his pistol on Ottavio, but Andriquès stabs the chief with her dagger, and the pirates look on, horrified. Andriquès grabs the oars and the lovers' boat puts out to water with the lovers, while the women on shore wave farewell.

== Music ==
Musical highlights of the score include the shimmering orchestral texture of the Prélude, the "markedly Spanish" Sérénade with its hints of guitars and with loud outbursts, exotic Danses marocaines, and a slow mazurka. Lalo's tendency to depict the exotic comes to the fore, with a "brilliance and charm which were lost on the majority of the audience". Cooper found Namouna is rhythmically rather monotonous but praised its orchestration, which seemed to him to recall Bizet "in its lightness, its aptness and colouring". Some of Lalo contemporaries were enthusiasts of the score. Chabrier pestered Lalo repeatedly for a copy; in response to a letter from Chabrier attempting to get hold of the piano reduction and orchestral score of the suites, Lalo bemoaned problems with his publishers in making available these scores of his works, the piano version missing. Debussy too was a supporter; as a teenager he had shouted his approval of Namouna so loudly he had to be removed from the theatre.

A suite of movements (Prélude; Sérénade; Thème varié; Parade de foire; Danse de Namouna; Fête foraine) was first performed in part at the Concerts du Château-d'Eau in Paris on 14 January 1883, conducted by Charles Lamoureux.
