= Lucien Petipa =

French ballet dancer (1815–1898)

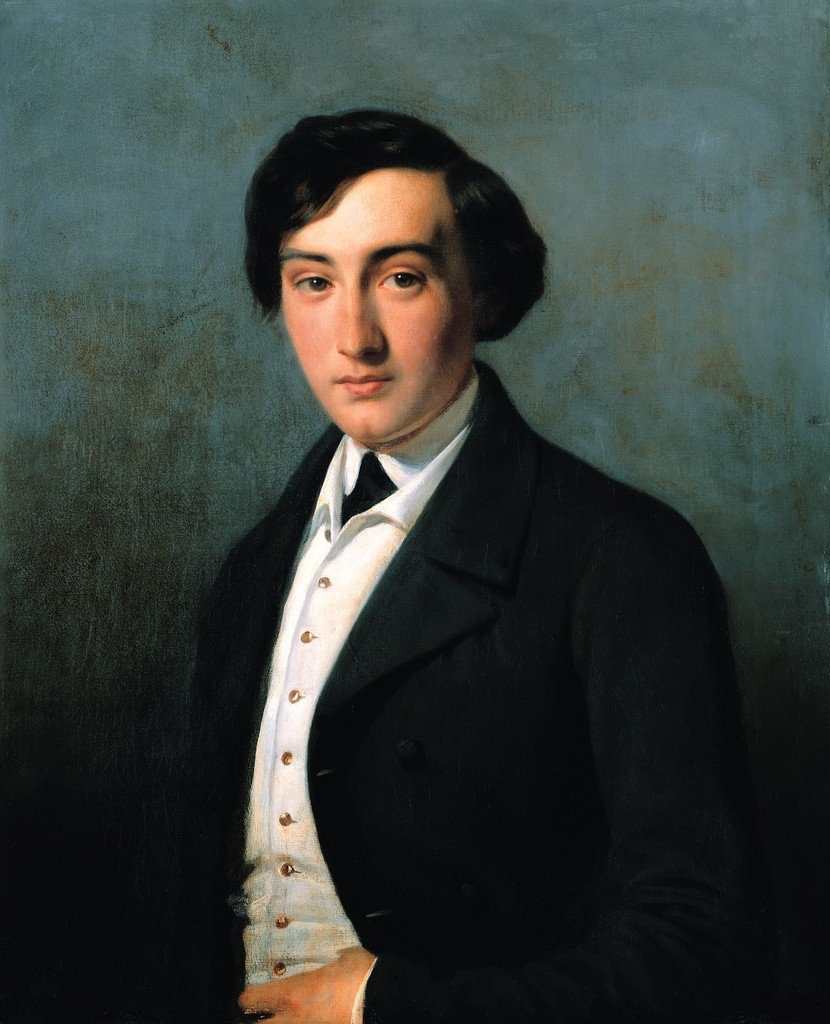
Portrait by Louise Adélaïde Desnos, 1849

Lucien Petipa (22 December 1815 – 7 July 1898) was a French ballet dancer during the Romantic period, and the elder brother to Marius Petipa, the famous ballet master of the Russian Imperial Ballet. He was born in Marseille and died in Versailles.

The son of Jean-Antoine Petipa, he was the original interpreter of many of the principal male roles during the Romantic era, working with choreographers such as Jean Coralli among others. Probably the most known role he created was Albert, Duke of Sliesa (later to be known as Count Albrecht) in the two-act ballet of Giselle in 1841, opposite the Italian-born ballerina Carlotta Grisi for whom the ballet was created. Between 1860 and 1868 he was maître de ballet at the Paris Opera and between 1872 and 1873 he ran the La Monnaie theater in Brussels.

== Notable roles ==
- Albert in Giselle (1841)
- Achmed in La Péri (1843)

== Ballets ==
- In 1857 Lucien Petipa staged a ballet to the music of the second version of the opera Le cheval de bronze.
- Sacountala (performed on July 14, 1858 at the Paris Opera)
- Graziosa (performed on March 25, 1861 at the Paris Opera)
- Le Roi d'Yvetot (performed on December 28, 1865 at the Paris Opera)
- Le Marché des innocents (The March of the Innocents), along with his brother Marius Petipa (October 14, 1872, performed in Brussels)
- Namouna (performed on February 10, 1882 at the Paris Opera)

== Sources ==
- "Петипа" . Brockhaus and Efron Encyclopedic Dictionary (in Russian). 1906.

Political offices
Preceded by Joseph Mazilier	Director of the Paris Opera Ballet; 1860-68	Succeeded by Henri Justamant
Preceded by Joseph Hansen	Director of the Théâtre de la Monnaie; 1872-73	Succeeded by Joseph Hansen
