= Malter family =

The Malter, Malterre or Maltaire family was a dynasty of French dancers and choreographers, from which came several members of the 18th century Académie royale de danse. It was a large family and it can often be difficult to identify its members with certainty, though the relationships given below are attested by contemporary documents:

- René Malter, dance master, member of the Académie royale de danse
- Jean-Pierre Malter (died 1730), dance master, member of the Académie royale de danse
- Claude Malter, dance master in Paris, brother of the above
- François-Antoine Malter (167?–1761), dance master, member of the Académie royale de danse, brother of the two above
  - René Malter (1695–1775), member and darling of the Académie royale de danse, son of François-Antoine
  - François-Louis Malter (1699–1788), dancer in the ballets du Roi, member of the Académie royale de danse, son of François-Antoine
- Jean-Baptiste Malter (1701–1746), member of the Académie royale de danse, notably danced in Grenoble, Lyon and London.
- François Duval dit Malter (born 1743), ballet master of the Opéra, son of Antoine Duval (dance master) and of Henriette Brigitte Malter, and nephew of the above
- Élisabeth Malter, dancer and ballet mistress
- Jean-François Malter, dancer in the French provinces
- Jean Malter dit Hamoir (died 1805), ballet master of the Théâtre des Variétés-Amusantes from 1779 to 1781
- Pierre-Conrad Malter, ballet master at the Théâtre de l'Ambigu-Comique in 1788.

Other sources indicate that the René Malter named above was the father of three dancers of the Académie royale de danse :

- François-Antoine the elder, nicknamed "la Petite Culotte", entered in 1714, premier danseur comique of the Opéra in 1720
- François-Louis the younger, nicknamed "the Devil"
- Jean-Baptiste, known as Malter III, nicknamed "the Bird" or "the Englishman".

== Bibliography ==
- Philippe Le Moal (ed.), Dictionnaire de la Danse, Paris, Larousse, 1999 ISBN 2-03-511318-0.
- Eugène Giraudet, Traité de la danse, Paris, published by the author, 1890.
- Auguste-Alexis Baron, Lettres et entretiens sur la danse ancienne, moderne, religieuse, civile, et théâtrale, Paris, Dondey-Dupré, 1824 (2nd edition, 1825, was entitled Lettres à Sophie sur la danse).
