= Frossard =

Frossard is a French surname. Notable people with the surname include:

- André Frossard (1915–1995), French journalist and writer
- Charles Auguste Frossard (1807–1875), French general
- Charles Frossard (bailiff) (1922–2012), Bailiff of Guernsey
- Christian Frossard, French slalom canoeist
- Denise Frossard (born 1950), Brazilian judge and politician
- Edward Frossard (1887–1968), British Anglican priest
- Louis Frossard, 18th-century French dancer
- Ludovic-Oscar Frossard (1889–1946), French politician
- Marie-Renée Frossard, 18th-century French ballet dancer
