= Élisabeth Soligny =

Jeanne-Élisabeth Le Clerc Soligny (née Malter, 1749), known also under her stage name Elisabeth Le Clerc, was a French ballet mistress and ballerina. She was a premier dancer at the French Ballet of the Du Londel Troupe in Sweden and of the Royal Swedish Ballet.

== Life and work ==
Le Clerc was employed at the Ballet of the French Theatre in Sweden, where she debuted in 1764. She was admired for her beauty, talent and grace. She was also known for her affairs with Arvid Horn and Henrik Johan von Düben. She was soon noted as one of the stars of the ballet and was appointed premier dancer and ballet mistress. She married the actor Pierre-Claude Soligny from the same theatre in 1770.

In 1771, the French Theatre was dissolved. When the Royal Swedish Ballet was founded in 1773, however, there were not yet enough Swedish dancers and many of the first members of this troupe consisted of dancers from the old French Ballet troupe. The most prominent of these dancers were Louis Gallodier, Ninon Dubois Le Clerc, Louis Frossard and Marie-Renée Frossard and Elisabeth Soligny; Soligny was Gallodier's dance partner in the ballets. She lost her position in the ballet in 1782, at the age of 33.

Soligny held an extramarital affair with Henrik Jakob von Düben.

== See also ==
- Sophie Daguin
- Marguerite Morel

== Sources ==
- Roempke, Gunilla (1994). Vristens makt: dansös i mätressernas tidevarv (in Swedish). Bokförlaget T. Fischer & Company. ISBN 978-91-7054-734-8.
