= Salle Richelieu =

Theatre in Paris, France

- Comédie-Française; Théâtre-Français; Théâtre de la République
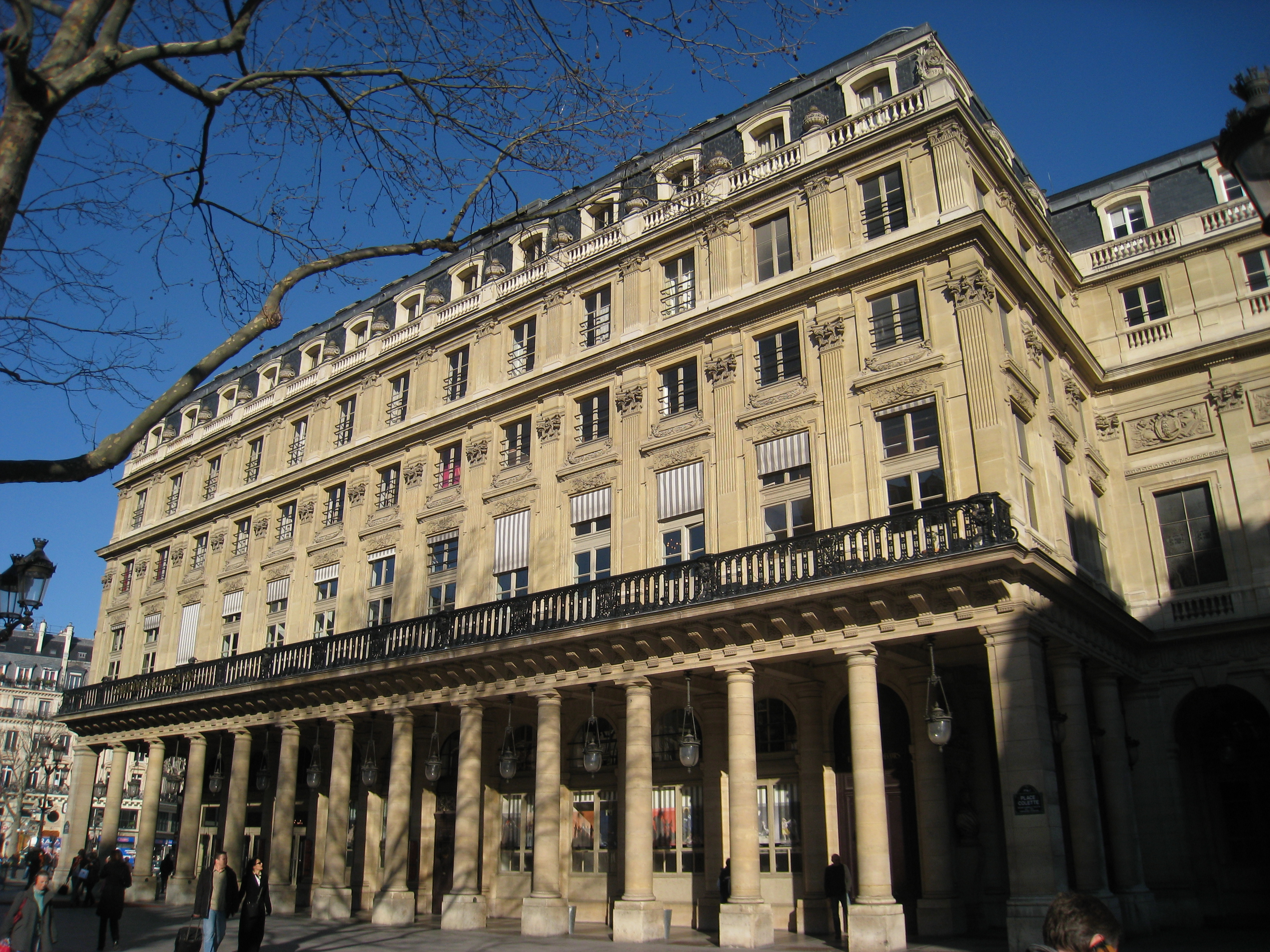
- West facade of the Salle Richelieu, seen from the intersection of the Avenue de l'Opéra with the rue de Richelieu
- Interactive map of Salle Richelieu
- Address: 2 rue de Richelieu, 1st arrondissement Paris
- Coordinates: 48.8635°N 2.3362°E
- Capacity: 862

Construction
- Opened: 1790 (Variétés-Amusantes); 1799 (Comédie-Française)
- Rebuilt: 1900 (after a fire)
- Architects: Victor Louis (1786–1790); Alexandre Moreau (1798); Pierre Fontaine (1822); Pierre Prosper Chabrol (1860); Julien Guadet (1900)

Website
- www.comedie-francaise.fr

The Salle Richelieu (French pronunciation: [sal ʁiʃ(ə)ljø]) is the principal theatre of the Comédie-Française. It is located in the Palais-Royal in the first arrondissement of Paris and was originally constructed in 1786–1790 to the designs of the architect Victor Louis. It seats 862 spectators.

== History ==
For the auditorium of his earlier theatre, the Grand Théâtre de Bordeaux (1773–1780), Victor Louis had combined the ancient semicircle with the ellipse giving a horseshoe plan and devised open balcony boxes, both features which he employed again in the Salle Richelieu (1786–1790), as well as in his later theatre, the Théâtre des Arts (1791–1793). As originally designed, the auditorium of the Salle Richelieu seated around 2,000 spectators. The site for the building was so constricted, he placed the entrance foyer under the auditorium. His design was also innovative for the use of an iron frame (under the roof, the floors and boxes), mainly for the purpose of fireproofing.

Originally called the Théâtre du Palais-Royal, it was first occupied by the Théâtre des Variétés-Amusantes, who gave the inaugural performance on 15 May 1790. It became the theatre of the Comédie-Française by an act of 14 May 1799, which merged the Variétés-Amusantes with the players from the Théâtre de la Nation of the Faubourg Saint-Germain. The new company gave their first performance on 30 May 1799 under the name Théâtre-Français de la République.

The interior of the auditorium was redesigned in 1798 by Jean-Charles-Alexandre Moreau and in 1822 by Pierre Fontaine, who reduced the diameter of the balcony columns, which had previously obstructed the view for many spectators. The ceiling was repainted by Pierre-Luc-Charles Ciceri in 1840. Additional interior restoration work was carried out by Théodore Charpentier in 1847 and 1850. The capacity in 1857 was 1,350 spectators. In 1858 the ceiling was repainted by Joseph Nolau and Auguste Rubé based on the designs of Félix-Joseph Barrias.

From 1860 to 1864, Pierre Prosper Chabrol carried out extensive modifications of the interior and exterior, as well as the expansion of the building toward today's Place Colette. The ceiling was repainted in 1864 by Philippe Chaperon with the assistance of Joseph Nolau and Auguste Rubé. It was repainted in 1879 by Alexis-Joseph Mazerolle, and in 1885, by Guillaume Debuffe. The theatre was destroyed by a fire on 8 March 1900. Only the walls of the facade remained standing. The new building, as reconstructed under the supervision of architects Julien Guadet and Henri Prudent, was inaugurated on 26 December 1900.

The "Fauteuil de Molière" (armchair of Molière), in which the actor agonized while performing the role of Argan in his last play, Le Malade imaginaire, is on permanent display in the public foyer of the theatre.

The painter Pierre Roussel created numerous portraits of actors who have appeared at the theatre. These can be found in the corridors and boxes.

== Photographs ==
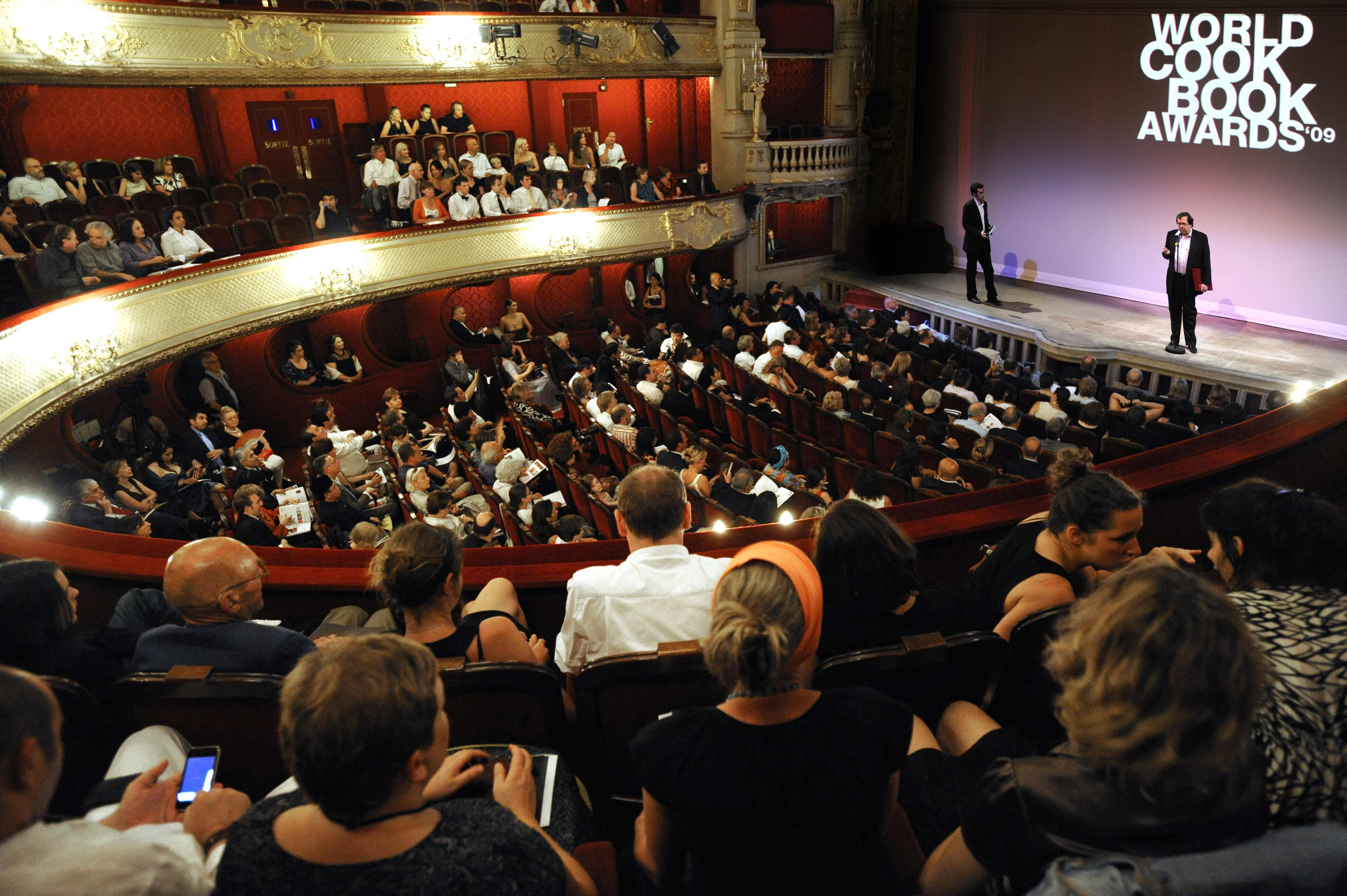
Auditorium

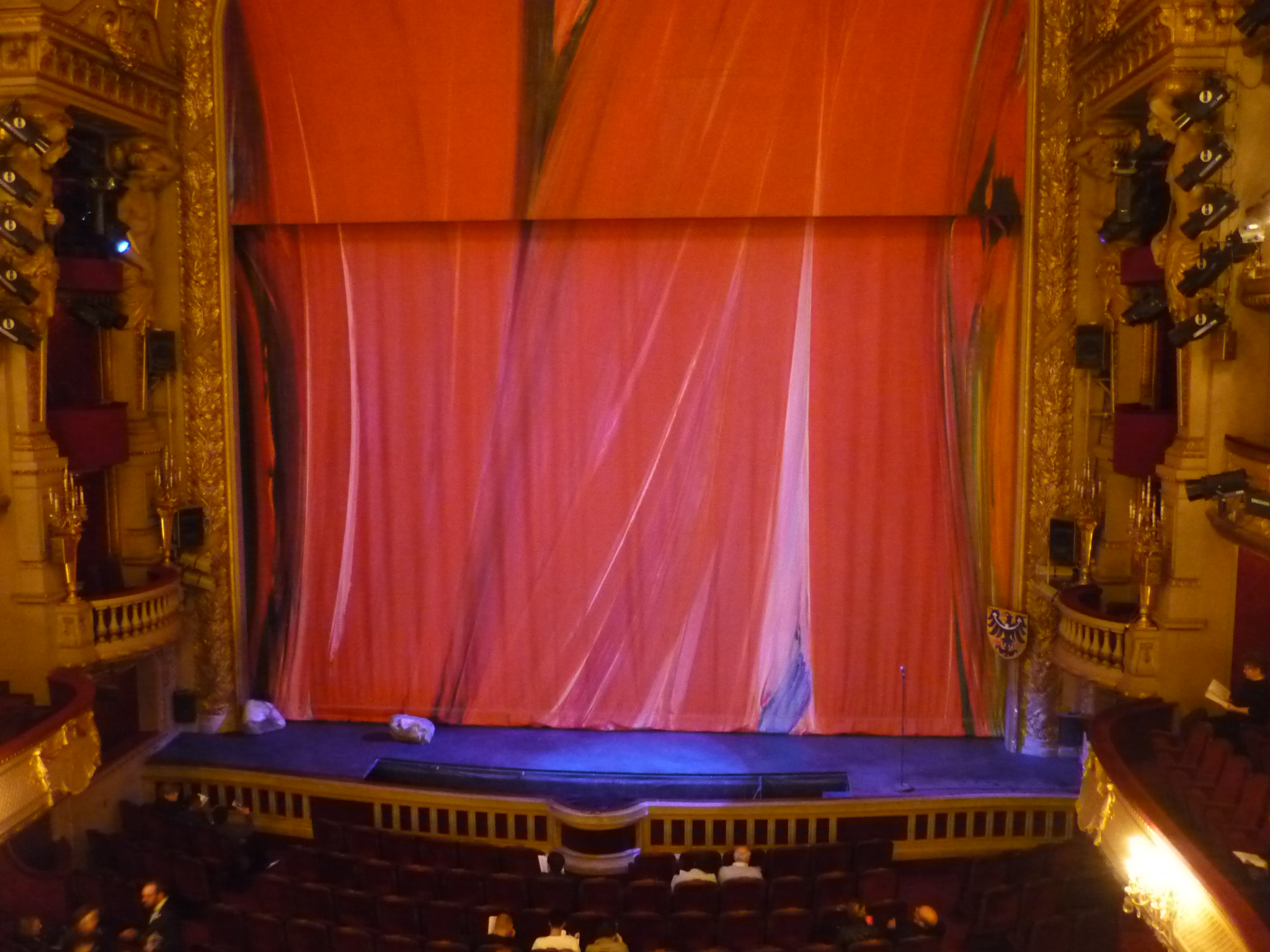
Stage

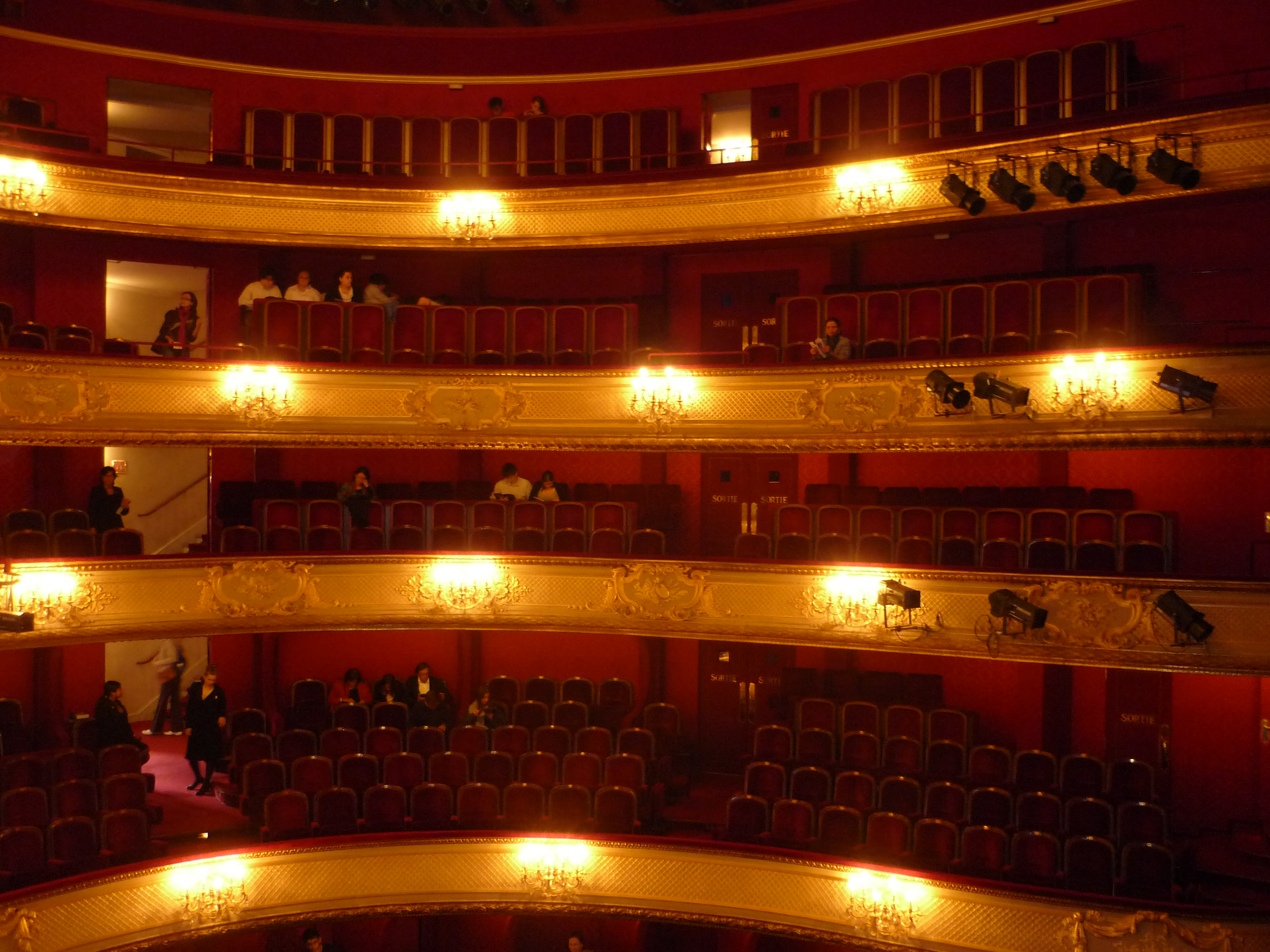
Balconies

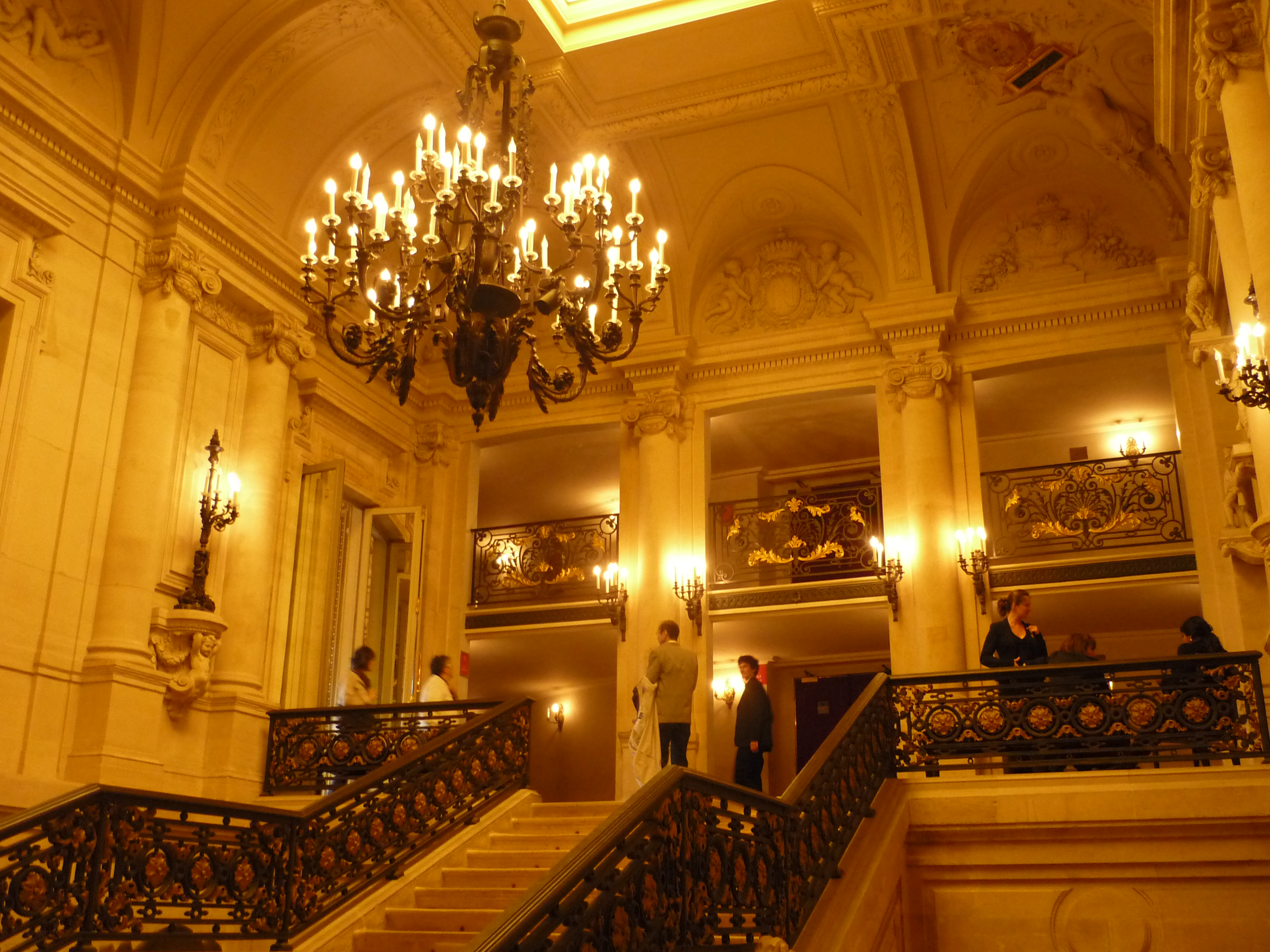
Grand Staircase

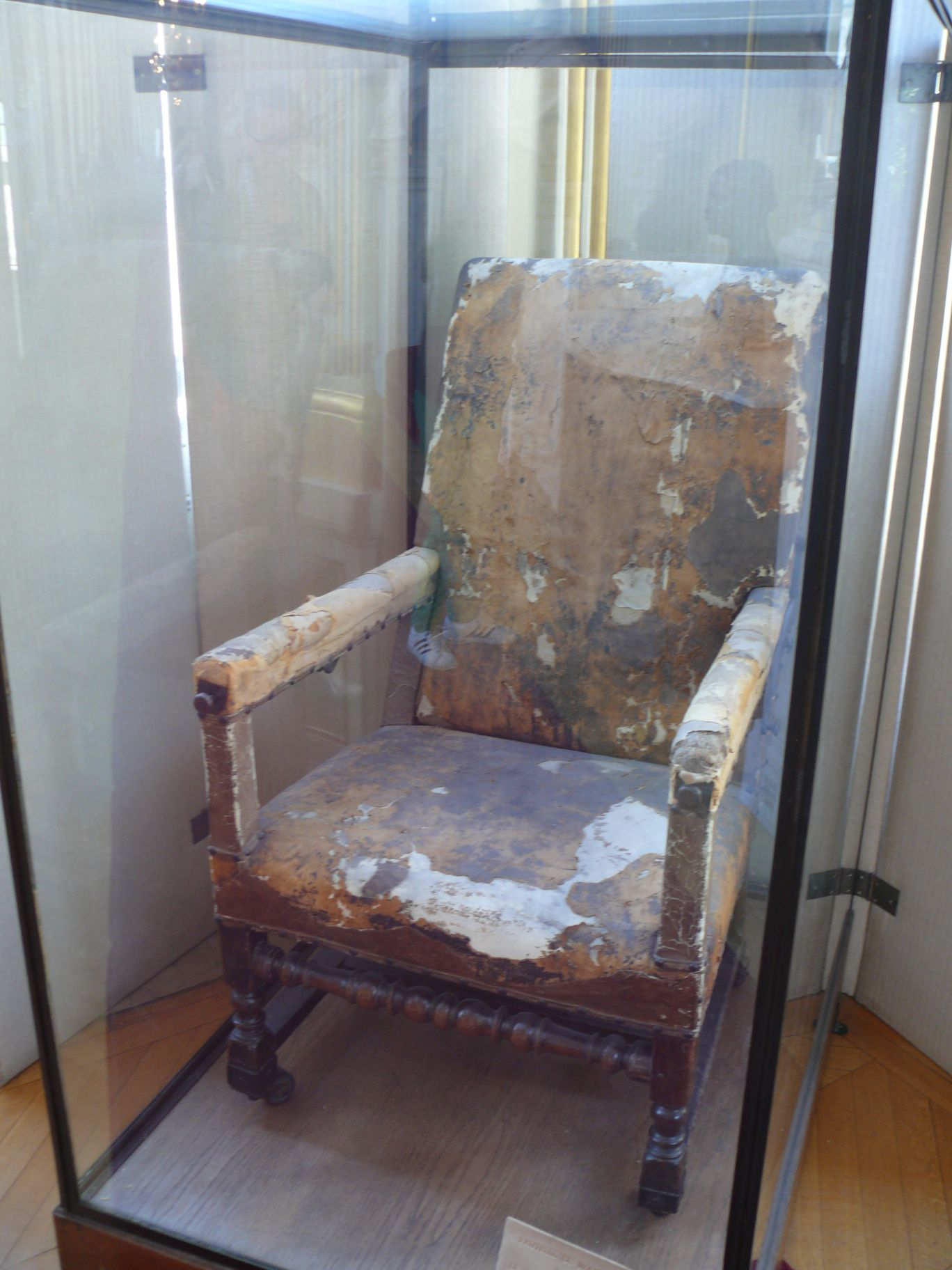
Fauteuil de Molière.

== Historical drawings ==
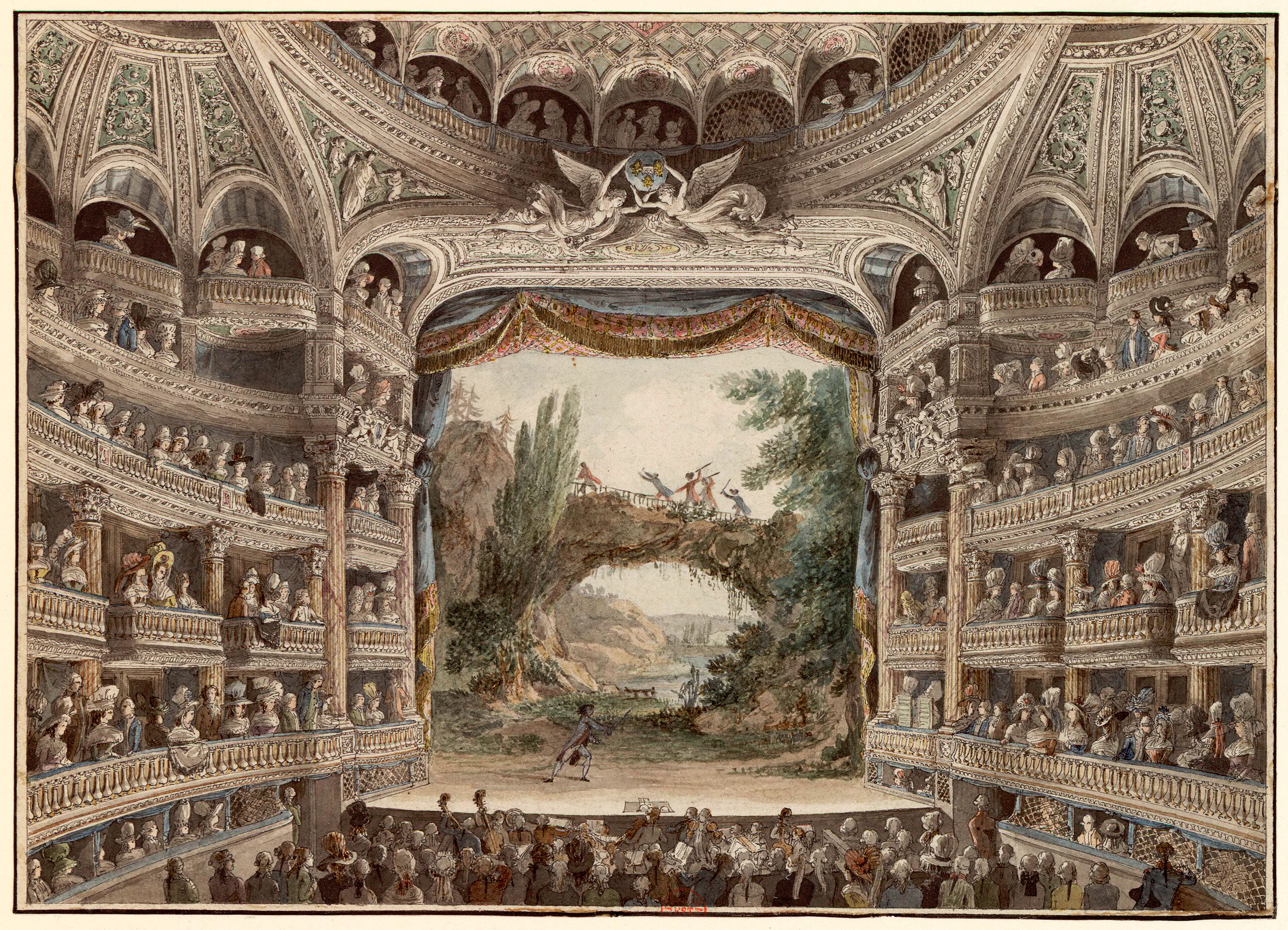
View of the auditorium and stage in 1790 (as designed by Victor Louis)

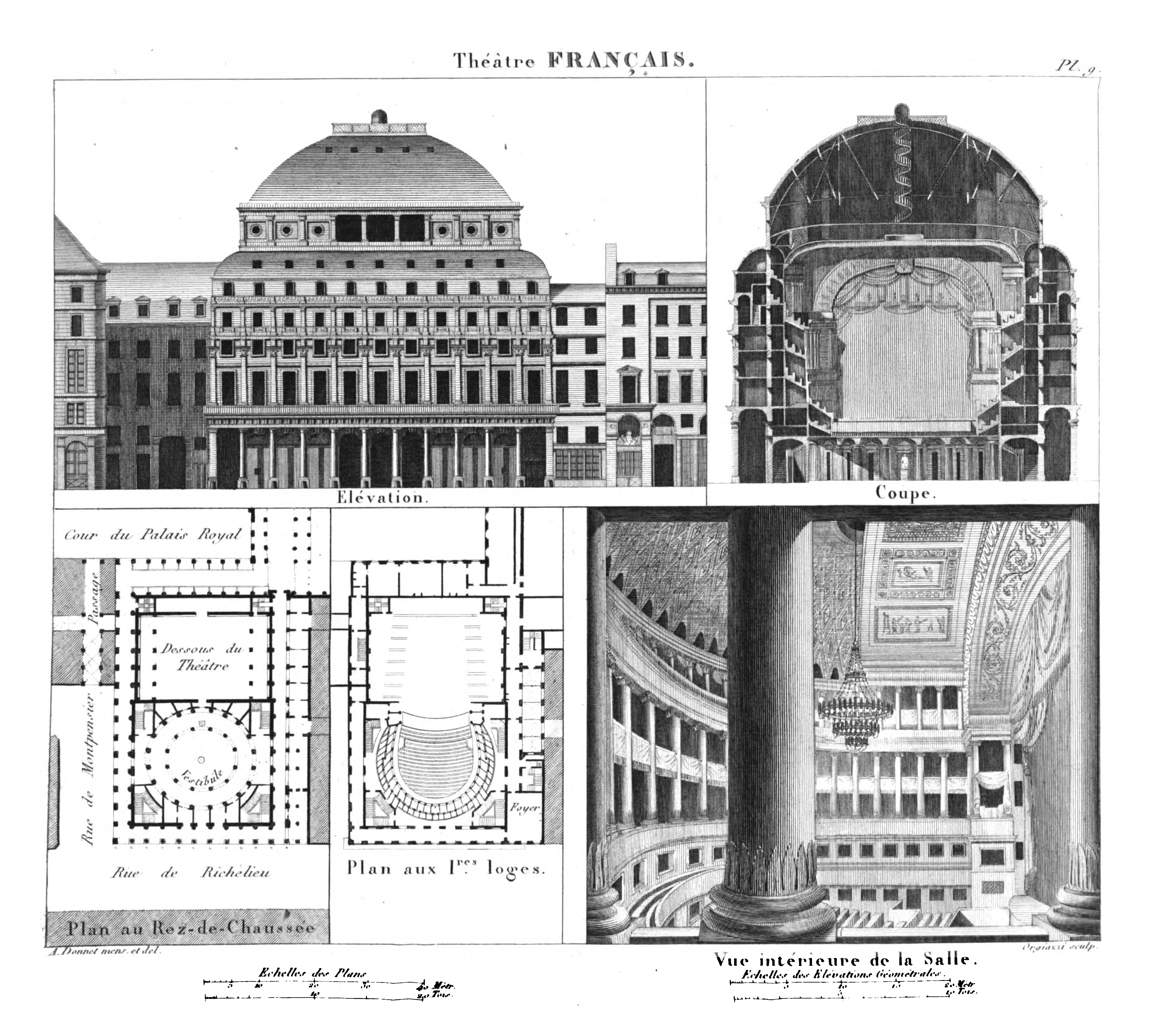
Theatre in 1821 (as redesigned by Jean-Charles-Alexandre Moreau in 1798)

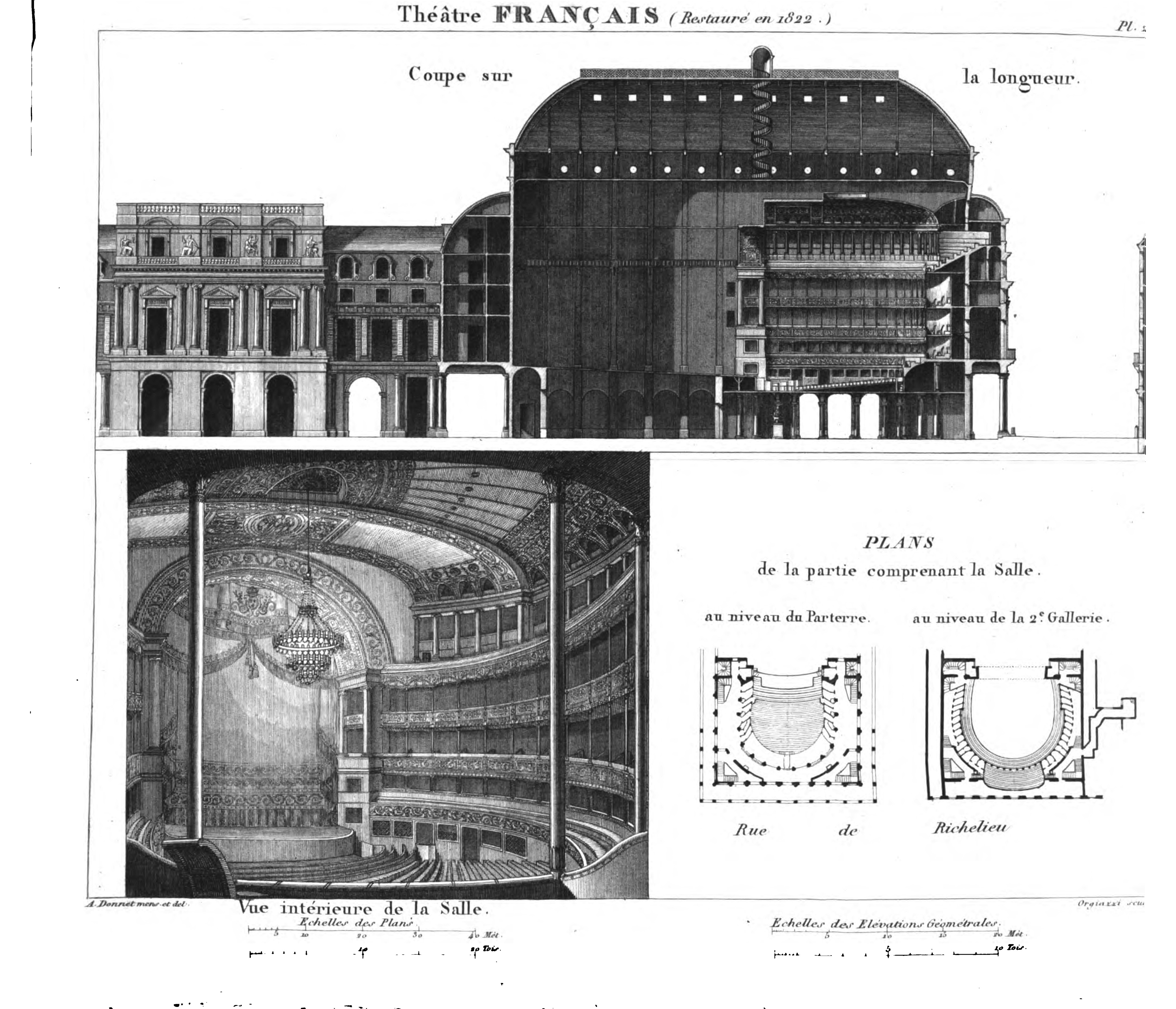
Theatre in 1822 (after its alteration by Pierre Fontaine)

== Bibliography ==
- Ayers, Andrew (2004). The Architecture of Paris. Stuttgart; London: Edition Axel Menges. ISBN 9783930698967.
- Donnet, Alexis (1821). "Théâtre Français", pp. 117–127, and "Théâtre Français (depuis sa restauration)", pp. 299–306, in Architectonographie des théâtres de Paris. Paris: P. Didot, l'aîné. Title page at Google Books.
- Mead, Christopher Curtis (1991). Charles Garnier's Paris Opéra: Architectural Empathy and the Renaissance of French Classicism. New York: The Architectural History Foundation. Cambridge, Massachusetts: The MIT Press. ISBN 9780262132756.
- Wild, Nicole ([1989]). Dictionnaire des théâtres parisiens au XIXe siècle: les théâtres et la musique. Paris: Aux Amateurs de livres. ISBN 9780828825863. ISBN 9782905053800 (paperback). View formats and editions at WorldCat.
- Wild, Nicole (2012). Dictionnaire des théâtres parisiens (1807–1914). Lyon: Symétrie. ISBN 9782914373487. OCLC 826926792.
