= François Duval (dancer) =

French dancer

François Duval (born 21 May 1743, Paris), known as Malter, was a French dancer.

== Biography ==
François Duval was the son of Antoine Duval, a dance master in Paris, and of Henriette Brigitte Malter. Two of his elder brothers were also involved in the theatre world; Antoine Jean François Duval (1732–?) left Paris in 1755 and worked as a dance master in Rochefort/Mer, whilst Jean Charles Duval (1741–?) was first violin at the Comédie de Lyon. François Duval was thus part of the Malter family, an 18th-century dynasty of dancers and dance-teachers.

He married Marie-Anne Hamoir, also from a family of dancers.

François became ballet master at the Académie royale de Danse. From 1778, he worked with Louis Hamoir and Jean Nicolas Le Mercier, then François Bigottini, as head of the Théâtre des Variétés-Amusantes, on rue de Bondy à Paris, at the théâtre de la foire Saint-Laurent.

== Sources ==
- Émile Campardon, Les spectacles de la Foire, Paris 1877
- Dictionnaire de la danse, Paris, Larousse, 1999
