= Matthew Koon =

British actor and dancer

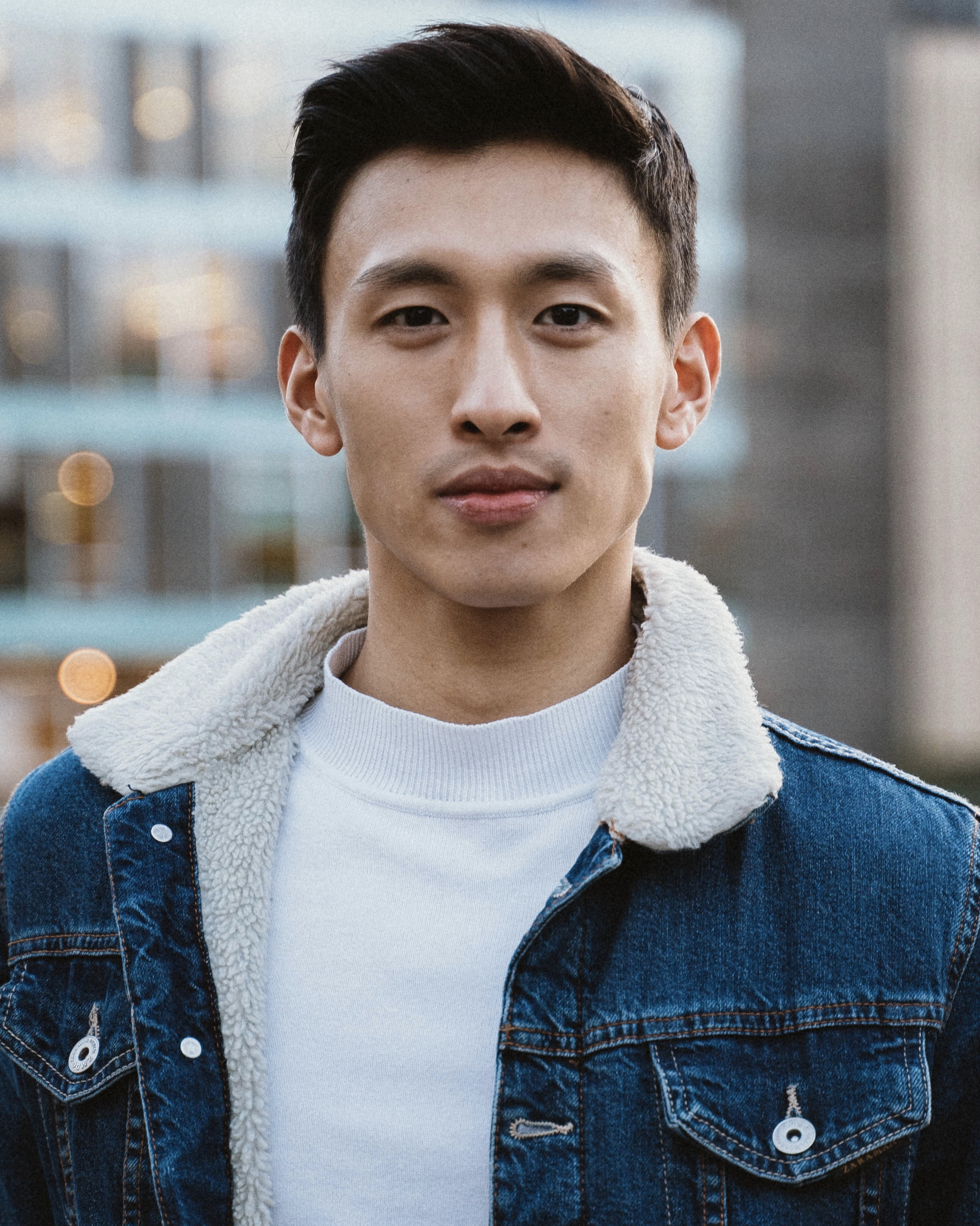
- Matthew Koon
- Born: UK

Matthew Koon is a British actor and dancer.

== Career ==
Koon began studying ballet at the age of 2, at the Alison Livesey School of Dance and Drama in Whitefield, Greater Manchester. At the age of 9, he auditioned for the Royal Ballet School Junior Associate programme, he was successful and consequently attended weekly classes in Leeds. He also trained at Centre Pointe Dance Studios in Manchester, before taking a full-time place at the English National Ballet School.

Koon made his professional stage debut at the age of 12, playing the title role of Billy Elliot in the West End production of Billy Elliot the Musical. He auditioned for the role at the Zion Centre, Manchester in February 2005. He made his first appearance in the role on 1 March 2006, and his final performance on 2 December 2006. He was the first boy from a Chinese background to play the role of Billy.

Following auditions in 2009, in 2010 Koon participated in the inaugural series of Got to Dance, a televised dance competition broadcast on Sky One. In articles about the show, he is quoted as saying that if he won the competition, he would use the prize money to continue his dance training at a professional performing arts school. He successfully competed in the second semi-final, ultimately finishing joint 3rd in the grand final on 14 February 2010.

In 2010, Koon won the national final of Dance Master UK, a stage dance competition for boys, promoted by the International Dance Teachers' Association. Having qualified for the competition in a regional heat, Koon competed against other regional finalists at the Opera House Theatre in the Winter Gardens, Blackpool. Koon was then offered a place at the English National Ballet School where he studied for 3 years and graduated in 2013 as one of the top in his class, gaining a contract at Northern Ballet.

Koon performed as a First Soloist with Northern Ballet for 8 years, dancing many lead roles to critical acclaim. In 2022 Koon performed his piece 'Existential', written and directed himself, at The Lowry Theatre as part of their Shoots Scratch Night Programme 2022.

== Awards and titles ==
- Fonteyn Nureyev Young Dancers Competition – Winner, 2008
- Janet Cram Awards – Outstanding Dance Award, 2008
- Janet Cram Awards – Boys Cup, 2008
- English Dance Championships – Winner, 2009
- Marjorie Davies Tap Awards – Senior Class Prize, 2009
- International Ballet Championship – Winner, 2009
- Young Ballet Dancer of the Year – Winner, 2009
- Young British Tap Dancer of the Year – Runner-up, 2009
- Dance Master UK – Winner, 2010
