= Bigottini =

Bigottini is a surname. Notable people with the surname include:

- Émilie Bigottini (1784–1858), French dancer
- Francesco Bigottini (c. 1717–after 1794), Italian actor, playwright, and set designer
