= Académie Royale de Danse =

Former French dance institution

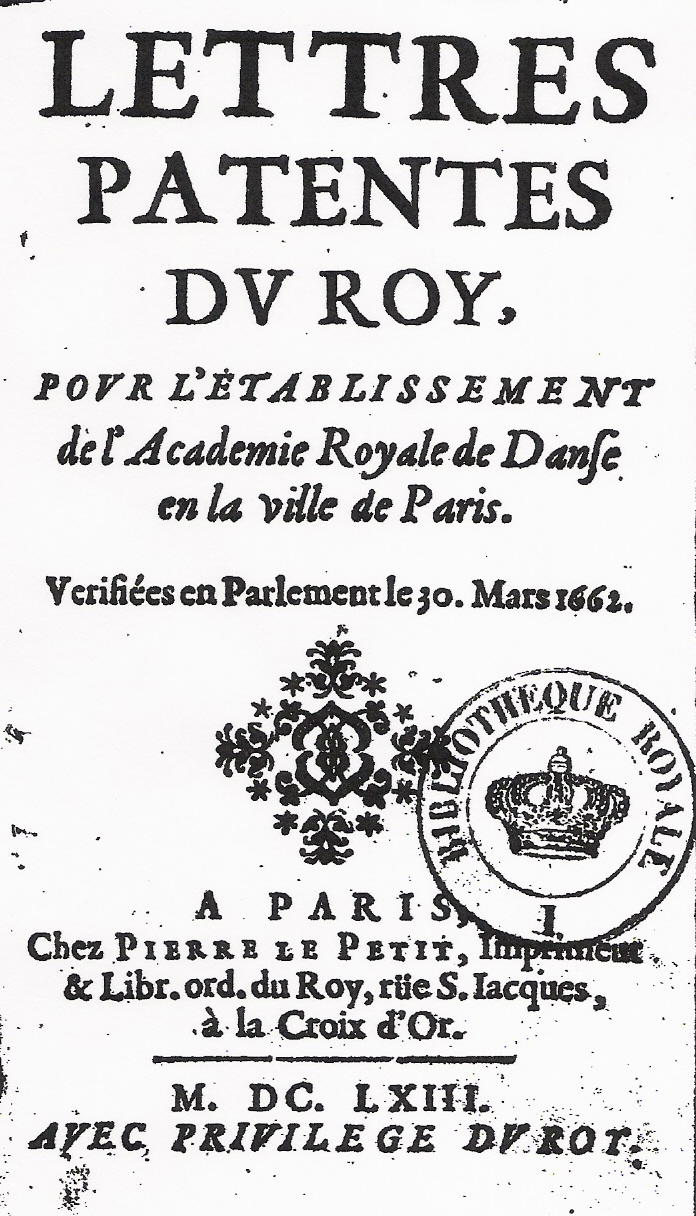
The academy's founding letters patent

The Académie Royale de Danse was a former dance academy founded by Letters Patent on the initiative of King Louis XIV of France in March 1661. It was the first dance institution established in the Western world.

== History ==
As one of King Louis' first official edicts after the death of royal adviser Jules Mazarin, the "Letters Patent of the King to Establish a Royal Academy of Dance in the City of Paris" represented a critical step towards the young King's consolidation of personal power. Structurally, the Académie consisted of thirteen dancing masters selected by King Louis XIV for being the "most experienced in the Art [of dance]." This "experience" was determined by each dancer's history of success in previous royal productions of ballets de cour. Most famously, eight of the selected dancing masters performed with King Louis XIV during his portrayal of Apollo, the Sun King, in Le Ballet de la nuit (1653). Although the object of the Académie was to reflect, analyze and normalize matters of dance, no document relating to its activity has survived.

The Académie Royale de Musique, founded in 1669 as the Académie d'Opéra, was a closely related opera and ballet company, and although the two institutions never merged, members of the dance academy were also associated with the opera. Little by little, recruitment of dancers into the royal entourage gave way to recruitment into the ballet-corps of the Opéra. This slowly altered the Académie's profile, making it and its members more dedicated to dance training alone. By 1775, the Académie was nearing the end of its life. On joining the Académie, Jean-Georges Noverre, one of ballet d’action's most influential choreographers, commented on its ineffectiveness in making meaningful contributions to the dance world. But Noverre's remarks concerning the organization should not be taken at face value, having been described as polemical, biased and misleading.

It is often claimed that the Académie ceased to exist after 1778, merely because a list of the thirteen members was no longer published after this date, or alternatively after 1789, with the coming of French Revolution and the abolition or nationalization of royal institutions. In a tribute to his deceased brother Maximilien published in the Courrier des spectacles (30 September 1798), Pierre Gardel, the head choreographer at the Paris Opéra at that time, writes that "these positions, which came with a pension [of 500 livres], passed in turn to the most distinguished dancers. Citizens [Auguste] Vestris and [Pierre] Gardel, currently at the Théâtre de la République et des Arts, are the last to have enjoyed these." It appears then that the Académie was indeed defunct by 1798. The opera and ballet company has survived and today is known as the Opéra National de Paris.

== Objectives ==
In the introduction to the Letters Patent, King Louis XIV cites the corruption of dance (primarily in his own court) as motivation for establishing the Académie. He goes on to charge the appointed dancing masters with restoring "the art of dancing to its original perfection and [improving] it as much as possible."

Letters Patent of this kind were only customarily written from the King's perspective; it is unlikely King Louis' personal convictions regarding the state of the art are actually represented here. This becomes clear when the Letters Patent are compared to those which established the Académie Française in 1635 and Académie Royale de Peinture et Sculpture in 1648; both mentioned the Académies would serve to right artistic disrepair and were promulgated well before King Louis' was old enough to draft policy.

Due to the King Louis' probable lack of involvement in the edict, it has been argued that the establishment of the Académie was primarily motivated by the dancing masters themselves. Using their proximity to the King and other royals in ballets de cour, the dancers were able elevate their profession above guild status while simultaneously securing wealth and influence.

In service of the broad objective to revitalize dance, the Letters provided sweeping powers to the Académie which brought the art squarely under royal control. Statute VIII of the Letters required all new dances in France—of any description—be reviewed and accepted by a majority of the Académie members (académistes) before they could be performed. In addition, Statute III established that dance instructor licenses were to be distributed solely by the approval of the académistes. The Letters left no ambiguity: it would be up to the Académie to define Parisian dance. Other statutes, like VII and XI, went beyond the académistes, requiring all professional dancers in Paris and the surrounding area to be officially registered with the Académie; the best of that number were then expected to be available for casting in court ballets at the whim of the King.

== Legacy ==
Since no archives of the Académie have been found, it has not been possible to evaluate in detail its activities and accomplishments. Despite this, it is still possible to trace the organization's influence through indirect means.

Dance historian Maureen Needham suggests the founding of the Académie may have been at least partly responsible for the end of ballets de cour proper. As ballet became more formalized at the hands of the Académie, the technical ability required to perform choreography went up substantially, quickly outpacing the skill of non-professional courtiers. Unable to keep up with the steps, members of the court could not dance alongside their accomplished masters as they did in the days of Le Ballet de la nuit (1653) and were thus consigned to observing performances from the sidelines. Countering declining numbers of courtiers dancing, the population of professional dancers expanded substantially.

King Louis XIV requested the development of a dance notation system by the académistes. Pierre Beauchamp, director of the Académie in 1680, provided one which was later co-opted, refined, and popularized by Raoul Auger Feuillet, after whom the notation system was subsequently named.

Something of the organization's purpose can be gleaned from an entry in the Spectacles de Paris (1778: 29–30):

"Independent of the Royal Academy of Music [i.e., the Paris Opéra], there is an Academy of Dance, the meetings of which are held at the director’s [home]. This Royal Academy of Dance was set up by Louis XIV in 1661, through lettres patentes ratified by parlement in 1662. The number of academy members is fixed at thirteen, and they enjoy the privilege – as do their children – of demonstrating the art of dance without lettres, as well as the right of committimus and other such, like those of the Officiers Commensaux of the Maison du Roi. They are to meet once a month in order to deliberate on whatever concerns their art. One of the main purposes of this Academy is to train sujets [i.e., soloists] for the Opéra."

== Controversies ==
=== The 13th member ===
While the published "Letters Patent of the King to Establish a Royal Academy of Dance in the City of Paris" specifies thirteen dancing masters were to lead the Académie, the corresponding list of names numbers only twelve. Based on cross-referencing mentions of the organization's thirteen members with other documents, however, it is clear the number is correctly stated. The identity of the omitted thirteenth member has long been a point of disagreement among dance historians. Gaston Vuillier forwarded Beauchamp as the missing member, while Régine Astier (Kunzel) unabashedly claimed it was Henri Prévost. Both were wrong. The original document signed by King Louis XIV was preserved in the French National Archives, and upon its close inspection in 1997 by scholar Maureen Needham, the thirteenth name was revealed to be "Molière."

Not to be confused with Jean-Baptiste Poquelin Molière (1622–73), the famous playwright of King Louis' reign responsible for ballets such as Le Bourgeois Gentilhomme (1670), the Molière mentioned in the text is accompanied by "La Jeune" translated into English as "the young" or "the younger." Given Poquelin was never known by such a title, it indicates "Molière" is the courtly spelling of "Mollier", as in Louis de Mollier (1615–88), an acclaimed dancer and musician of the court. Of course, Louis de Mollier is older than Jean-Baptiste Poquelin Molière, however historical records (such as p. 103 of the Mercure Galant, July 1677) show Louis de Mollier was commonly known as "le petit Molière," likely due to his waning popularity in comparison to Poquelin.[8] It is thus feasible that "Molière La Jeune" is equivalent to "Molière le petit."

Dance scholar Rose Pruiksma offers yet another possibility, by citing the gender of the name used in the official edict: "La" Jeune (female) rather than "Le" Jeune (male). Pruiksma proffers the hypothesis that "Molière La Jeune" is perhaps Marie Blanche Mollier (1644–1733), the daughter of "Molière le petit." Marie Mollier was an accomplished dancer of ballets de cour in her own right and was no stranger to the stage of Louis XIV by the time of the Académie's establishment. As Pruiskma indicates, the addition of a female dancing master in the Académie provides a compelling reason for the thirteenth name to be wiped from official court documentation, and would explain the development of female dancers in Le Triomphe de l’amour at the Paris Opéra in 1681. Of course, while the name "Molière La Jeune" indicates youthfulness, Marie Mollier's age, only seventeen in 1661, makes her being the 13th "senior" académiste still highly contested.

=== Saint-Julien ===
The dance academy's members (académistes) formed part of the king's entourage and court and were, for the most part, simultaneously both dancers and musicians. It was this that motivated the fraternity of musicians of Saint-Julien to publish a factum against the "prétendus Académiciens" in 1664. This long plaidoirie (meaning legal speech for the defence), entitled Le mariage de la musique avec la dance, was signed by Guillaume Dumanoir, "violin player to His Majesty, one of the 25 members of his "grand' Bande", and also holder of the Office de Roy of the Instrument Players, and of the dance masters of France". The quarrel was settled in 1695, by a decree according the same rights to both parties.

== Founding Letters Patent ==
Text of the Letter patentes

« Louis par la grace de Dieu, Roy de France et de Navarre, À tous presens & à venir, Salut. Bien que l'Art de la Danse ait toûjours esté reconnu l'un des plus honnestes & plus necessaires à former le corps, & luy donner les premieres & plus naturelles dispositions à toute sorte d'exercices, & entre autres à ceux des armes; & par consequent l'un des plus avantageux & plus utiles à nostre Noblesse, & autres qui ont l'honneur de nous approcher, non seulement en temps de guerre dans nos armées, mais mesme en temps de paix dans le divertissement de nos Ballets : Neanmoins il s'est pendant les desordres & le confusion des dernieres guerres, introduit dans ledit Art, comme en tous les autres, un si grand nombre d'abus capables de les porter à leur ruïne irreparable, que plusieurs personnes pour ignorans & inhabiles qu'ils ayent esté en cet Art de la Danse, se sont ingerez de la monstrer publiquement; en sorte qu'il y a lieu de s'étonner que le petit nombre de ceux qui se sont trouvez capables de l'enseigner ayent par leur étude & par leur application si longtemps resisté aux essentiels defauts dont le nombre infiny des ignorans ont tâché de la défigurer & de la corrompre en la personne de la plus grande partie des Gens de qualité : Ce qui fait que nous en voyons peu dans nostre Cour & suite, capables & en estat d'entrer dans nos Ballets, & autres semblables divertissemens de Danse, quelque dessein que nous en eussions de yes y appeller. A quoy estant necessaire de pourvoir, & desirant rétablir ledit Art dans sa premiere perfection, & l'augmenter autant que faire se pourra : Nous avons jugé à propos d'établir en nostre bonne ville de Paris, une Academie Royale de Danse, à l'exemple de celles de Peinture & Sculpture, composée de treize des Anciens & plus experimentez au fait dudit Art, pour faire par eux en tel lieu & maison qu'ils voudront choisir dans ladite ville, l'exercice de toute sorte de Danse suivant les Statuts & reglemens que nous en avons fait dresser en nombre de douze principaux articles. A ces causes, & autres bonnes considerations à ce nous mouvans, nous avons par ces presentes signées de nostre main, & de nostre pleine puissance & autorité Royale, dit, statué & ordonné, disons, statuons, & ordonnons, voulons & nous plaist, qu'il soit incessamment étably en nostredite ville de Paris, une Academie Royale de Danse, que nous avons composée de treize des plus experimentez dudit Art, & dont l'adresse & la capacité nous est connüe par l'experience que nous en avons souvent faite dans nos Ballets, où nous leur avons fait l'honneur de les appeller depuis quelques années, sçavoir de François Galland sieur du Desert, Maistre ordinaire à Danser de la Reine nostre tres-chere Epouse, Jean Renauld Maître ordinaire à Danser de nôtre tres-cher & unique Frere le Duc d'Orleans, Thomas le Vacher, Hilaire l'Olivet, Jean & Guillaume Reynal, freres, Guillaume Queru, Nicolas de l'Orge, Jean François Piquet, Jean Grigny, Florent Galland Desert, & Guillaume Renauld; lesquels s'assembleront une fois le mois, dans tel lieu ou maison qui sera par eux choisie & prise à frais communs pour y conferer entre eux du fait de la Danse, aviser & deliberer sur les moyens de la perfectionner, & corriger les abus & defauts qui y peuvent avoir esté ou estre cy-aprés introduits; tenir & regir ladite Academie suivant & conformément ausdits Statuts & Reglemens cy-attachez sous le contrescel de nostre Chancellerie : lesquels nous voulons estre gardez & observez selon leur forme & teneur : Faisant tres-expresses défenses à toutes personnes de quelque qualité qu'ils soient, d'y contrevenir aux peines y contenuës, & de plus grande s'il y écheoit. Voulons que les susnommez & autres qui composeront ladite Academie, jouïssent à l'instar de ladite Academie de Peinture & Sculpture, du droit de Committimus, de toutes les causes personnelles, possessoires, hypotequaires ou mixtes, tant en demandant que défendant par devant les Maistres des Requêtes ordinaires de nostre Hôtel, ou aux Requestes du Palais à Paris, à leur choix, tout ainsi qu'en jouïssent les Officiers commenseaux de nostre Maison, & décharge de toutes Tailles & Curatelles, ensemble de tout Guet & Garde. Voulons que ledit Art de Danse soit & demeure pour toûjours exemt de toutes Lettres de Maîtrise, & si par surprise ou autrement en quelque maniere que ce soit, il en avoit esté ou estoit cy-aprés expedié aucune; Nous les avons dés à present revoquées, déclarées nulles & nul effet; faisant tres-expresses défenses à ceux qui les auront obtenuës de s'en servir à peine de quinze cens livres d'amende, & autant de dommages & interests, applicable à ladite Academie. Si donnons en mandement à nos Amez & Feaux les Gens tenans nostre Cour de Parlement de Paris, que ces presentes ils ayent à faire lire, publier & registrer, & du contenu en icelles, faire jouïr & user ledit Desert, Renauld & autres de ladite Academie Royale, cessant & faisant cesser tous troubles & empeschemens contraires : Car tel est nostre plaisir. Et ainsi que ce soit chose ferme & stable à toûjours, nous avons fait mettre nostre scel à cesdites presentes, sauf en autres choses nostre droit, & l'autruy en toutes. Donné à Paris au mois de Mars, l'an de grace 1661 & de nostre regne le 19^{e}. Signé LOUYS, & sur le reply par le Roy, DE GUENEGAUD »

=== Members ===
- 1662 (foundation)
1. François Galant du Désert (director)
2. Florent Galant du Désert
3. Jean Renauld
4. Guillaume Renauld
5. Guillaume Raynal
6. Jean Raynal
7. Guillaume Quéru
8. Hilaire d'Olivet
9. Thomas Le Vacher
10. Nicolas de Lorges
11. Jean-François Piquet
12. Jean Grigny
13. "Molière La Jeune"

- 1753 (from the Les Spectacles de Paris)
1. Antoine Bandieri de Laval (director)
2. François Marcel
3. René Malter
4. François-Antoine Malter
5. François-Louis Malter
6. Antoine Dangeville
7. David Dumoulin
8. Louis Dupré
9. Jean-Baptiste Javillier
10. Antoine Matignon
11. Denis Dupré
12. Jean-Barthélémy Lany
13. Gaétan Vestris
- 1680 (from the Mercure Galant)
1. Pierre Beauchamp (director)
2. Jean ou Guillaume Renauld
3. Florent Galant du Désert
4. Guillaume Quéru
5. Bernard de Manthe
6. Guillaume Raynal
7. Jean Raynal
8. Nicolas de Lorges
9. Jean ou François Piquet
10. Michel Blondy
11. Romain Dumirail
12. Joseph Ferrand
13. François Marcel

- 1778 (last known mention)
1. Michel Laval (director)
2. François-Antoine Malter
3. Jean-Baptiste Javillier
4. Jean-Denis Dupré
5. Jean-Barthélémy Lany
6. Gaétan Vestris
7. Lyonnois
8. Maximilien Gardel
9. Jean Dauberval
10. François Duval dit Malter
11. Jean-Georges Noverre
12. François-Louis Malter

== See also ==
- Paris Opera Ballet
- French art salons and academies
