= Jean-Charles-Alexandre Moreau =

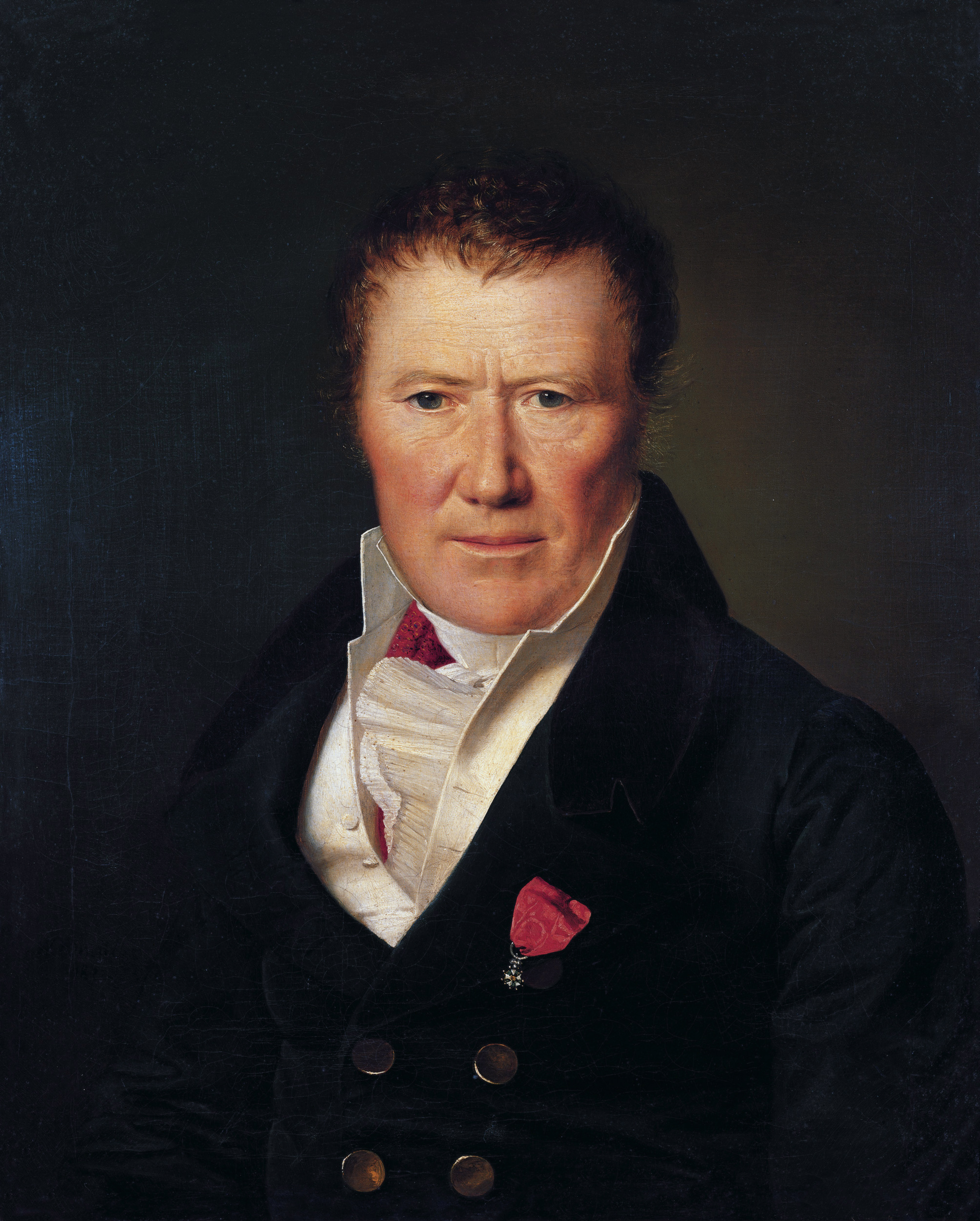
- Born: 1762
- Died: 1810 (aged 47–48)
- Known for: History painter

Jean-Charles-Alexandre Moreau (1762–1810) was a French history painter, decorative painter and architect. He was born in Rimaucourt near Neufchâteau, Vosges. He studied architecture in Paris with Louis-François Trouard and won the first prize in architecture in the Prix de Rome competition of 1785. He visited Rome four times during his career. Later he studied history painting with Jacques-Louis David. From 1797 to 1810, he exhibited at the Paris Salon. In 1798 he renovated the theatre of the Comédie-Française. According to his entry in the Benezit Dictionary of Artists, Moreau died in 1810 in Paris. However, the German Wikipedia cites a study published in 2014, which shows he is identical to a French architect, who in 1803 moved to Austria, where he was known as Karl Moreau, had a very productive career, and died in 1840 (see de:Charles de Moreau).

== Bibliography ==
- Benezit (2006). "Moreau, Charles", vol. 9, p. 1276, in Benezit Dictionary of Artists. Paris: Gründ. ISBN 9782700030709.
- Lemonnier, Henry (1926). Procès-verbaux de l'Académie royale d'architecture 1671–1793, volume 9 (1780–1793). Paris: Armand Colin. Title page at Internet Archive.
- Wild, Nicole (2012). Dictionnaire des théâtres parisiens (1807–1914). Lyon: Symétrie. ISBN 9782914373487. OCLC 826926792.
