= Miss Dance of Great Britain =

Stage dance competition for girls, held annually in the United Kingdom

Miss Dance of Great Britain is a stage dance competition for girls, which is held annually in the United Kingdom.

== Overview ==
Miss Dance of Great Britain is a long running theatre dance competition for girls, established and organised by the International Dance Teachers Association. The national finals are held annually at the Winter Gardens in Blackpool, England. The finals also include the judging of the boys competition, Dance Master UK, and the International Ballet Championships.

=== Qualifying ===
Entrants who wish to compete in the national finals of Miss Dance, must first qualify for the competition by winning a regional heat. Heats are held at dance festivals nationwide throughout the year. The majority of these festivals are independently run and must apply to the IDTA in order to stage a heat of Miss Dance.

To enter a regional heat, competitors must be aged 16 years or over on 31 May in the year of competition and must be amateur dancers or be in full-time training. Professional dancers are not permitted to enter.

In the heats, each competitor performs a three-minute solo dance in a modern theatre or cabaret style. This may include jazz, tap, song, dialogue, instrumentation or comedy, with dance as the dominant discipline. Classical Ballet, character dance or national dance styles are not permitted. The IDTA requests that competitors present a solo that has been specially choreographed for the competition. Should a competitor win their regional heat, they must perform the same solo, without changes, at the national final.

To qualify for the national finals, a competitor must win their heat with a score of 85 marks or more, and they then represent that festival at the finals. A runner-up place is also awarded and the runner-up may compete at the national finals if they have scored a qualifying mark and only if the heat winner is unable to compete. It is very common for dancers to compete in numerous regional heats throughout the country in order to qualify for the national finals.

=== The Finals ===
The national finals of Miss Dance are organised by the IDTA and are held annually at the Winter Gardens in Blackpool. During the finals, the competitors compete in a series of dance-offs, judged by a panel of specialist adjudicators. This narrows down the number of competitors to a selection of finalists, who then perform again for the judges in the grand final and the winner of the Miss Dance title is awarded.

The winner of Miss Dance of Great Britain receives a trophy and a cash prize, with trophies also being awarded for the runner-up and 3rd places. The winner is given the title of Miss Dance of Great Britain, until a new winner is chosen the following year.

Being a prestigious competition, the winner of Miss Dance will normally enjoy a number of other benefits including dancing at various IDTA seminars and events, and being invited to perform at the IDTA's annual showcase gala at a major UK theatre.

Because it is such a prestigious title the previous winners of miss dance's names will all be published in the most recent programmes. Their names will ascend chronologically.

== Grand Final Winners ==
=== 2024 ===
- Winner - Alexie Hulley of Elaine Howarth Centre Stage School
- Runner Up - Grace McGinley of McKechnie School of Dance
- 3rd Place - Nancy-Lee Maloney of Maloney Stage School

=== 2023 ===
- Winner - Ruby Nuttall of McLaren Dance Company
- Runner Up - Ellie Woods of Amy Richardson Studios
- 3rd Place - Lilly Cadwallender of VA Performing Arts

=== 2022 ===
- Winner - Scarlett O’Connor of Shine Theatre Arts
- Runner Up - Olivia Moore of McLaren Dance Company
- 3rd Place - Sorcha Stephenson of Nadines Dance Company

=== 2019 ===
- Winner - Grace Hawksworth of Victoria Stansfield School of Dance
- Runner Up - Lauren Wood of Wirral Theatre School
- 3rd Place - Lucy Holcroft of Berry Academy of Dance

=== 2018 ===
- Winner - Leah Darby of Adele Taylor School of Dance
- Runner Up - Megan Dury of Tabs Studios Performing Arts Company
- 3rd Place - Ellie Burke of Jeanette McCulloch School of Dance

=== 2017 ===
- Winner - Abbie Platts of Nadines Dance Company
- Runner Up - Ame Marie Barnett of Tabs Studios Performing Arts Company
- 3rd Place - Bree Quinton of Berry Academy of Dance

=== 2016 ===
- Winner - Harriet Fisher of Strickland Cook Dance School
- Runner Up- Eloise Gledhill of Adele Taylor School of Dance
- 3rd Place - Ciara Farrelly of Marion Sweeney School of Dance

=== 2015 ===
- Winner - Demi Leigh Foster of Nadines Dance Company
- Runner Up- Eloise Gledhill of Adele Taylor School of Dance
- 3rd Place - Maddie Lawton of Adele Taylor School of Dance

=== 2014 ===
- Winner - Hollie-Jane Woodhouse of Betty Chappelle Dance Centre
- Runner Up - Ebony Kitts of Hazelbiz Performers Academy
- 3rd Place - Francesca Thompson of The Gwyneth Hare School of Dancing

=== 2013 ===
- Winner - Amelia- Rose Fielding of Adele Taylor School of Dance
- Runner Up- Olivia Roach of Riley School of Dance
- 3rd Place- Chloe Murray of Armley Dance Studios

=== 2012 ===
- Winner - Lucie Horsfall of Adele Taylor School of Dance
- Runner Up- Chloe Murray of Armley Dance Studios
- 3rd Place- Amelia Rose Fielding of Adele Taylor School of Dance

=== 2011 ===
- Winner - Bethany Whittle of Elaine Milbourne Performing Arts School
- Runner Up - Courtney George of Georgie School of Theatre Arts
- 3rd Place - Amy Bryson Smith of the Riley School of Dance

=== 2010 ===
- Winner - Yasmin Harrison of Phil Winston's Theatre Works
- Runner Up - Stephanie Thompson of the Hazel Bell School of Dance and Phil Winston's Theatre Works
- 3rd Place - Samantha Carson of the Riley School of Dance

=== 2009 ===
- Winner - Sophie Turner of the Riley School of Dance
- Runner Up - Stephanie Thompson of the Hazel Bell School of Dance
- 3rd Place - Amy Bryson Smith of the Riley School of Dance

=== 2008 ===
- Winner - Kirby Campbell of the Suzanne Stuart School of Dance
- Runner Up - Rachael McMahon of the Suzanne Stuart School of Dance
- 3rd Place - Samantha Carson of the Riley School of Dance

=== 2007 ===
- Winner - Jessica Smyth of the Leicester college of performing arts
- Runner Up - Rachael McMahon of the Suzanne Stuart School of Dance
- 3rd Place - Cherry Muir of the Val Armstrong Academy of Performing Arts

=== 2006 ===
- Winner - Holly Brierley of the Robinson Read School of Dance

=== 2005 ===
- Winner - Lorna Sales of Jean Geddess School of Dance

=== 2004 ===
- Winner - Alicia Peacock of the Elizabeth Hill School Of Dance and Drama

=== 2003 ===
- Winner - Leanne Marshbank of Riley School of Dance
