= Hamoir (dancer) =

French ballet dancer and theatre director

Jean Malter (died November 1805, London), known as Hamoir, was a French ballet dancer and theatre director. He was one of the last of the Malter family, an 18th-century dynasty of dancers.

He appeared in the Comédie-Italienne in Paris in the 1762–1763 season, before staying in London from 1765 to 1772. On his return to Paris the following year, he was engaged as premier danseur at the Comédie-Italienne from 1773 to 1777, all the while continuing to produce from time to time on the London and Dublin stage. A ballet master at the Théâtre des Variétés-Amusantes from 1779 to 1781, he put on Le Forgeron, La Place publique, Les Bostangis, La Fausse peur, Les Quakers, Les Jardins protégés par l'Amour and Les Ruses villageoises.

Hamoir then became ballet master and premier danseur comique at the Theatre of La Monnaie and Royal Park Theatre in Brussels in 1783, with his sister Rosalie, from whom he could never be separated and who he often had pass for his wife. On his return to England in 1785, Hamoir set himself up as a dance professor in Birmingham and appeared in London until 1791. His last production was L'Heureux Naufrage (The Happy Shipwreck), a ballet "in the Scottish style", at the King's Theatre in July 1796.

== Sources ==
- (in French) Jean-Philippe Van Aelbroeck, Hamoir, in Dictionnaire des danseurs: chorégraphes et maîtres de danse à Bruxelles de 1600 à 1830, Editions Mardaga, 1994, p. 136.
