= Dorvigny =

French novelist, actor and playwright (1742–1812)

Louis-François Archambault (French pronunciation: [lwi fʁɑ̃swa aʁʃɑ̃bo]; 30 March 1742, Paris – 5 January 1812, Paris), stage name Dorvigny ([dɔʁviɲi]), was a French novelist, actor and playwright, and the inventor of "janotism" (gross errors of language for comic effect).

Said to be an illegitimate son of King Louis XV, he began his acting career under Nicolet and put on plays at the Théâtre des Variétés-Amusantes, the Théâtre de l'Ambigu-Comique, the Grands-Danseurs du Roi, the Théâtre des Délassements-Comiques and the Théâtre des Associés.

== Works ==
Theatre

- À bon chat, bon rat, comédie-proverbe (text online)
- Aujourd'hui, ou Roger Bontemps, comedy in one act and in prose, Paris, Théâtre de l'Ambigu-Comique, 15 June 1782
- Bernique, ou le Tyran comique, parody in 3 acts and in verse, Théâtre de l'Ambigu-Comique, 21 August 1787
- Blaise le hargneux, comedy in one act and in prose, Théâtre des Grands-Danseurs du Roi, 17 November 1782
- Cà n'en est pas, proverbe
- Carmagnole et Guillot Gorju, tragédie pour rire
- Chacun son métier, les champs sont bien gardés, proverbe
- Christophe le Rond, comedy in one act and in prose
- Hurlubrelu ou Tout de travers, comedy in one act and in prose
- Janot chez le dégraisseur ou A quelque chose malheur est bon, proverbe, Théâtre des Variétés-Amusantes, 18 October 1779 (text online)
- Janot ou les Battus payent l'amende, comedy proverbe in one act
- Jocrisse au bal de l'Opéra, folie in two acts
- Jocrisse congédié, folie in two acts
- La Corbeille enchantée ou le Pays des chimères, comedy avec spectacle and divertissemens
- La Fête de campagne ou l'intendant comédien malgré lui, one-act comedy épisodique, in prose and in verse
- La Méprise innocente, comedy in one acte and in prose, Paris, Théâtre de l'Ambigu-Comique, 31 October 1791
- La Rage d'amour, parody of Roland in one act and in verse, mingled with vaudevilles and ariettes, Théâtre de l'Hôtel de Bourgogne, 19 March 1778
- L'Avocat chansonnier, ou Qui compte sans son hôte compte deux fois, comédie-proverbe, Théâtre des Variétés-Amusantes, 18 August 1779
- Le Brave Homme, comedy in one act and in prose, Théâtre des Élèves pour la Danse de l'Opéra, 24 April 1779
- Le Désespoir de Jocrisse, comédie-folie in two acts and in prose, Théâtre Montansier, 22 November 1791 (text online)
- Le Mai, one-act comedy
- Le Nègre blanc, comedy in one act and in prose, Théâtre des Variétés-Amusantes, 28 June 1780
- Le Niais de Sologne ou Il n'est pas si bête qu'il en a l'air, comedy in one act in prose
- Le Sultan généreux, three-act comedy in verse, Théâtre de l'Ambigu-Comique, 10 May 1784
- L'Emménagement de la folie, one-act comedy
- Les Battus paient l'amende ou Ce que l'on voudra, proverbe-comédie-parade
- Les Bons Amis ou Il était temps, parodie d'Iphigénie en Tauride, in one act and in verse, comédie-proverbe, Théâtre des Variétés-Amusantes, 2 July 1779
- Les Désespérés ou le Projet anglais, comedy in one act and in prose
- Les Étrennes de l'amitié, de l'amour et de la nature, comedy in one acte, in verse
- Les Fausses consultations, one-act comedy in prose
- Les Folies à la mode, one-act comedy
- Les Réclamations contre l'emprunt forcé, one-act comedy, Théâtre d'Émulation, 9 January 1796 (text online)
- Les Suisses de Châteauvieux, two-act historical play in prose, Théâtre Molière, 5 December 1791
- L'Hospitalité ou le Bonheur du vieux père, opéra comique in one act and in vaudevilles, mingled with Italian music
- L'Intendant comédien malgré lui, comédie épisodique
- Ni l'un ni l'autre, one-act comedy
- On fait ce qu'on peut et non pas ce qu'on veut, comédie-proverbe with two actors
- Oui ou non, one-act comedy in prose
- Qui court deux lièvres n'en prend aucun, comedy in prose, Théâtre des Grands-Danseurs du Roi, 30 November 1782
- Raimonde, ou Laissez chacun comme il est, one-act play in prose, Théâtre des Grands-Danseurs du Roi, 10 October 1782

Novels

- Mystifications d'Innocentin Poulot, petit-fils de M. de Pouceaugnac
- Nouveau Roman comique
- Ma tante Geneviève ou je l'ai échappé belle
- Madelon Friquet et Colin Tampon ou les Amants du Faubourg Saint-Martin
- Le Ménage diabolique
- La Femme à projets
- Madame Botte
- Les Caprices et bizarreries de la nature
- Les Quatre cousins
- Les Mille et un guignons
