= Francesco Bigottini =

Italian actor, playwright and set designer

Francesco or François Bigottini (c.1717, Rome – after 1794, probably in Paris) was an Italian actor, playwright, and set designer active in Italy, the Netherlands, France, Switzerland and Spain.

== Life ==
In his Mémoires, Carlo Goldoni says he first met Bigottini in Rimini in 1741, where the latter was playing harlequin rôles. From the 1750s Bigottini appeared in the Netherlands, Austrian Netherlands and France, playing in Rotterdam in 1754, Brussels in 1756, and in Paris at the Théâtre-Italien in 1757. Gueullette wrote "On Wednesday 26 April [1757], an Italian harlequin called Bigottini made his début in "Arlequin Scanderberg" and "Arlequin Hulla"; in the former, he played a rôle as a master of music very well, and played very badly in "Arlequin Hulla"; he was sent packing shortly afterwards". Bigottini left for the French provinces and acted in Marseille in 1760, where he put on his own play Coraline Protée (1761). He was in Geneva from 1766 to 1768, where he printed his play L'Origine d'Arlequin, avec sa naissance (1766). The Mercure de France wrote that he was the "first inventor of the machines used in the metamorphosis in the Fée Urgelle in Geneva" (that is, the transformation of a cottage into a splendid castle).

After playing in Lyon, Bigottini travelled towards Spain and spent three years playing at the Italian opera-house in Cádiz, from which he negotiated to be taken on at Brussels Théâtre de la Monnaie. In one of his letters, he wrote to that theatre's heads, Vitzthumb and Compain "I have nearly all my sets and machines for my plays, and I would thus also furnish you with all that I have, sets, machines, ropes, pulleys, scrap and all the other "diableries", if you would be furnish me with the wood". They finally took him on as a harlequin for the 1774–1775 season, with his contract stipulating that he would "lend [the theatre] all his machines and sets".

On 18 February 1777, he made a second début at the Théâtre-Italien, in Arlequin esprit follet, a play he had written himself. The Mercure de France wrote: "His metamorphoses are very numerous and very surprising. Mr Bigottini is admired for the variety of his changes, by their speed and attack with which he executes them, by the contrast he makes between his different rôles, and by the varied talents he develops. This actor sings, in a strong and pleasing manner, airs of his own composition.". However, after the suppression of the Italian theatrical genre in Paris at the start of 1780, Bigottini was dismissed with a compensation corresponding to his previous salary.

In January 1780, he collaborated with François Duval-Malter, Louis Hamoir and Jean-Nicolas Le Mercier to head the Théâtre des Variétés-Amusantes, but had to give up this post 11 months later due to his own financial difficulties. He left for the provinces and set himself up in Toulouse, where he devoted himself to painting and had a child, the future dancer Émilie Bigottini.
