= Jean-Baptiste Malter =

French dancer and ballet master (1701-1758)

Jean-Baptiste Malter (6 November 1701 – 8 April 1758) was a French dancer and ballet master, known under the names Aubin-Jean-Michel Malter, Jean-Baptiste or Jean-Nicolas. He was a member of the Malter family of dancers.

== Early life and education ==
The son of Jean-Nicolas Malter, known as de Saint-Aubin, and of Madeleine Gosselin, Jean-Baptiste was born in Bordeaux, where he learned dance from his father, who was there received in the confraternity of dance masters on 29 December 1710.

== Career ==
In Marseille on 19 June 1725, he married Catherine Dussoye, known as Labbé, a young dancer from Toulouse. The couple danced in Tours in 1726, Grenoble in 1729, Rouen in 1732, and then in Brussels in 1733 en route to London.

In Marie Sallé's company, Jean-Baptiste made his English debut at the Royal Opera House on 8 November 1733, quickly winning celebrity. He and his wife joined the company of French actors raised by Francisque for the 1734-35 season at the Haymarket, as well as making several trips back and forth between London and Paris. Jean-Baptiste, the cousin of the Malter brothers, then made his début at the Opéra de Paris in 1734, soon gaining the nicknames "l'Anglais" or "la Petite Culotte".

== Family and death ==
Malter and Labbé's daughter Jeanne-Élisabeth was baptised in Saint-Venant on 13 December 1726. They also had a son named Étienne Malter.

He remarried after Labbé's death. Malter died on 8 April 1758 in Nantes.
