= Marie-Renée Frossard =

French ballerina

Marie-Renée Frossard, née Malter, was a French ballerina with an international career. She was active in Sweden in 1764–76, where she was regarded as one of the stars of the Royal Swedish Ballet.

Marie-Renée Frossard was married to her colleague Louis Frossard. She was engaged at the Comédie-Italienne in Paris in 1757, in Vienna in 1759 and in Brussels in 1761–62. From 1764 until 1770, she and her spouse were engaged at the Du Londel Troupe in Sweden, where they were regarded as two of the most noted members. The French theater was dissolved by Gustav III of Sweden in 1771, who wished to establish a native theater, opera and ballet.

When the Swedish Royal ballet was founded in 1773, however, there were almost no native ballet dancers at all, with the exception of the very few, such as Charlotte Slottsberg, who had been trained in the French theater. Ballet master Louis Gallodier therefore recommended the king to recall some of the French dancers to perform and educate native dancers as students. The Frossard couple were among those French artists employed in the first pioneer troupe of the Swedish Royal Ballet. These French dancers were the first stars of the Swedish Royal Ballet until their native students had matured as artists, and Marie-Renée Frossard, Louis Frossard, Elisabeth Soligny and Ninon Dubois Le Clerc, were referred to as the foundation of the royal ballet. Aside from their position in the ballet, they also participated in the French Theater of Gustav III.

The Frossards were specialists in the art form "danse de caractére et pantomime". During the 1774-75 season, they made a success as members of the Sami people in the opera Birger Jarl written by the king himself. Their status as elite stars is exemplified by their salaries: in 1774, the Frossards were given a salary of 25.000 $. This compared to the salary of the opera singer Lovisa Augusti who, though a star at the Royal Swedish Opera, only had $6000.

The Frossards left Sweden in 1776. They were engaged at Lyon in France in 1782-85, and at the Comédie-Italienne in Paris in 1785-91.
