= Louis Frossard =

Louis Frossard was an 18th-century French dancer who conducted part of his career in Sweden.

A dancer at the Comédie Italienne of Paris in 1757-1758, he stayed in Vienna from 1759 to 1761 and performed particularly in ballets by Charles Bernardy and Gasparo Angiolini. Back to the Comédie Italienne in 1761–1762, he was hired by the Théâtre de la Monnaie in Brussels, with his wife Marie-Renée Malter, a relative of the Malter dancers.

Called to the court of Sweden, he was principal dancer of the Royal Swedish Ballet directed by Louis Gallodier until 1772. After he returned to the Théâtre-Italien of Paris as ballet master, he was recalled to Stockholm the following year and remained there until 1776. Charles-Louis Didelot was one of his pupils.

Back in France, Frossard and his wife settled in Lyon, where they led a troupe of children from 1782 to 1785. Indebted from his undertaking, Frossard returned to the Comédie Italienne and ended there his career about 1791. He died in Paris 29 January 1807.

His father Edme Frossard, also a dancer, died in Stockholm in October 1769.
