= Winter Gardens, Blackpool =

UK entertainment complex (opened 1878)

Winter Gardens
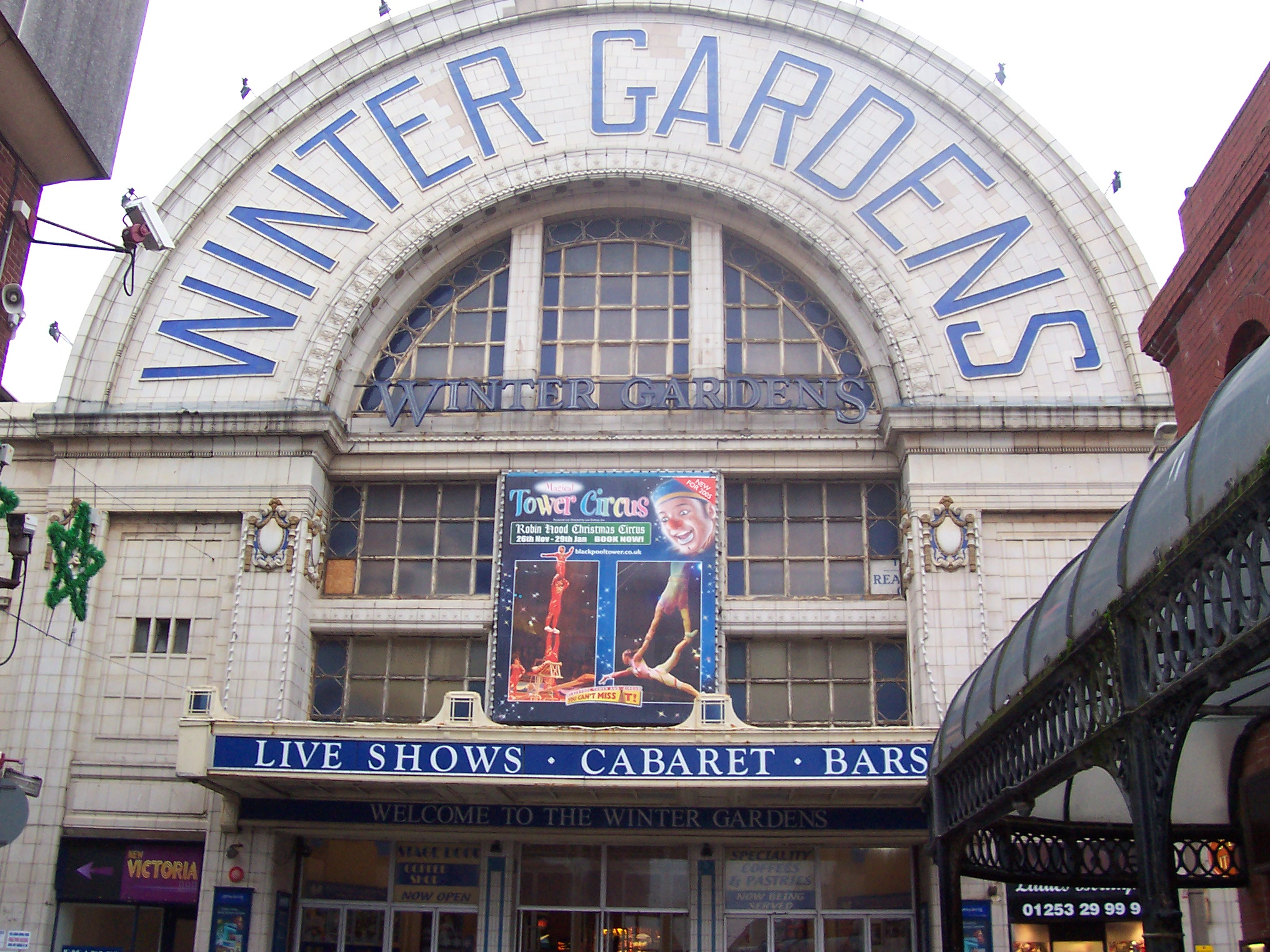
- Winter Gardens

- Location within Blackpool

General information
- Type: Entertainment complex
- Location: 97 Church Street, Blackpool, FY1 1HL
- Coordinates: 53.8171°N 3.0509°W
- Construction started: 1875
- Inaugurated: 11 July 1878
- Cost: £100,000 (equivalent to £10,000,000 in 2025)
- Owner: Blackpool Council
- Operator: Blackpool Tourism Ltd (since 2026)

Design and construction
- Designations

Listed Building – Grade II*
- Official name: The Winter Gardens
- Designated: 10 October 1973
- Reference no.: 1072007

The Winter Gardens is a large entertainment complex in Blackpool, Lancashire, England, which includes a theatre, ballroom and conference facilities. Opened in 1878, it is a Grade II* listed building, operated by Blackpool Entertainment Company Limited on behalf of Blackpool Council, which purchased the property from Leisure Parcs Ltd as part of a £40 million deal in 2010.

The Winter Gardens has hosted the annual Trades Union Congress, the Conservative Party Conference, Labour Party Conference, and the twice-annual Liberal Democrat Conference. The venue's owners claim that every Prime Minister, since World War II has addressed an audience at the venue.

It has also hosted the Blackpool Dance Festival since its inception in 1920, and the World Matchplay darts tournament since 1994. The annual dance competitions Miss Dance of Great Britain and Dance Master UK are hosted there annually.

== History ==
The Winter Gardens Company bought the site in 1875 for £28,000. The Winter Gardens was built on the 6-acre (2.4 ha) Bank Hey Estate and officially opened on 11 July 1878. The original intention was "to place on the land a concert room, promenades, conservatories and other accessories calculated to convert the estate into a pleasant lounge, especially desirous during inclement days."

The Vestibule, Floral Hall, Ambulatory and Pavilion Theatre were all built in the 1870s and the Opera House Theatre originally opened in 1889. The Empress Ballroom was built in 1896, together with the Indian Lounge (now the Arena). The long-gone Blackpool Ferris wheel, erected in 1896, was also located at the complex.

In 1910, the Opera House Theatre was rebuilt. Ownership of the complex changed in 1928 when the Winter Gardens Company was taken over by the Tower Company.

In 1930, the Olympia was built and the following year saw the addition of the Galleon Bar, Spanish Hall and Baronial Hall. The Opera House Theatre was rebuilt in 1939.

EMI took over the complex in 1967, and ownership changed hands again in 1983 when it was bought by First Leisure. In 1998, Leisure Parcs acquired the Winter Gardens from First Leisure's Resorts Division as part of an estimated £74 million deal which also included Blackpool Tower. On 3 December 2009, it was revealed that Leisure Parcs had accepted an offer of £40 million from Blackpool Council to buy the Winter Gardens as well as the Tower, and other sites in the resort. The deal, financed through a combination of government regeneration cash, European funding and a loan, was finalised in March 2010.

In June 2014, Blackpool Council created Blackpool Entertainment Company Ltd (BECL) to operate the Winter Gardens. Further operation changes occurred in February 2026, when BECL was dissolved and the Winter Gardens were transferred to Blackpool Council's main tourism company Blackpool Tourism Limited.

Political party conferences have increasingly taken place in major cities with modern, purpose-built conference centres such as ICC Birmingham, ACC Liverpool and Manchester Central Convention Complex, with the most recent major conference in Blackpool being the Conservative conference in 2007.

Since 1996, the venue has hosted the yearly Rebellion Punk Festival.

== Location ==
The Winter Gardens is in Blackpool's town centre, about 250 metres (820 ft) from the sea front. The complex occupies most of its block, a roughly square footprint with sides about 200 metres (660 ft) in length. The two north-facing corners of the block are not taken up by the Gardens buildings themselves, however, but by shops and restaurants. The northwest corner is completely separated by a road serving the stage door of the theatres. The west face also accommodates a few small shops with the same architectural styling as the main building. The complex is bounded by roads on all sides – Church Street, Leopold Grove, Adelaide Street and Coronation Street.

== Component buildings ==
The Opera House and Pavilion theatres, the Empress Ballroom, the Olympia exhibition hall and the Arena function hall are on the ground floor. All are contiguous and contained inside an Art Deco surface with a large arcade connecting two main entrances. There are additional function rooms on the first floor including the Spanish Hall, Baronial Hall and Renaissance Hall.

=== Ground floor ===
==== Opera House Theatre ====
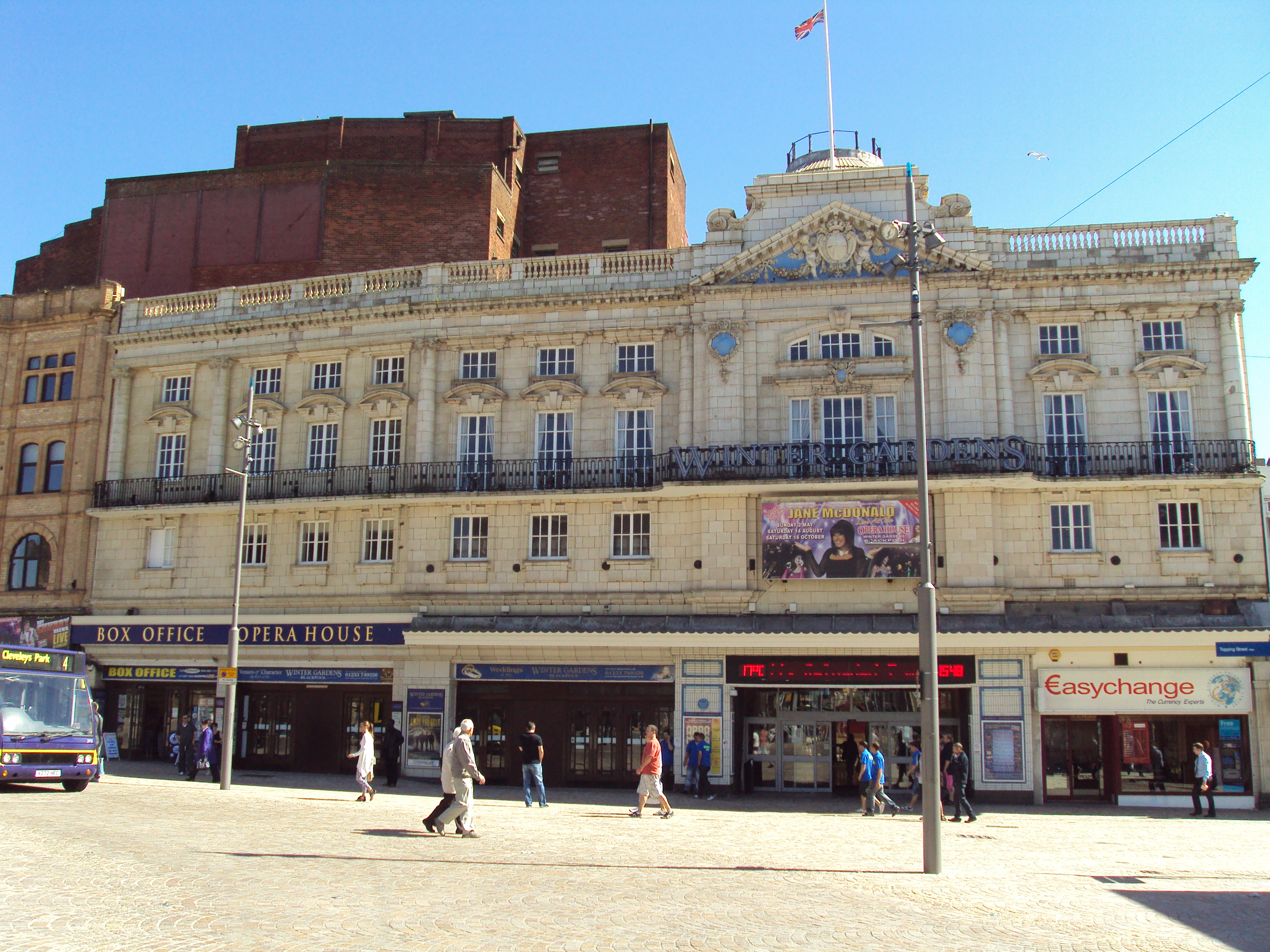
Opera House Theatre

The 3,000-seater Opera House is one of the largest theatres in the United Kingdom. The present theatre is the third one to have been built on the site.

The original building, completed in 1889, at a cost of £9,098 was designed by the theatre architect Frank Matcham, who also designed the nearby Grand Theatre and the Tower Ballroom. It had 2,500 seats, and was named Her Majesty's Opera House.

The theatre's seating capacity was soon deemed insufficient and in November 1910 was closed for reconstruction. The new and larger building opened just nine months later. However, in 1938 the second Opera House was demolished and the present 3,000-seat theatre opened in 1939.

The first Royal Variety Performance to be held outside London was staged at the Opera House in 1955. In 2009, the Royal Variety Performance was again staged at the theatre. It is home to the last new Wurlitzer organ to be installed in the UK.

The Opera House Theatre hosts many theatrical performances in addition to variety shows and music concerts. Current capacity is 2,813.

==== Empress Ballroom ====
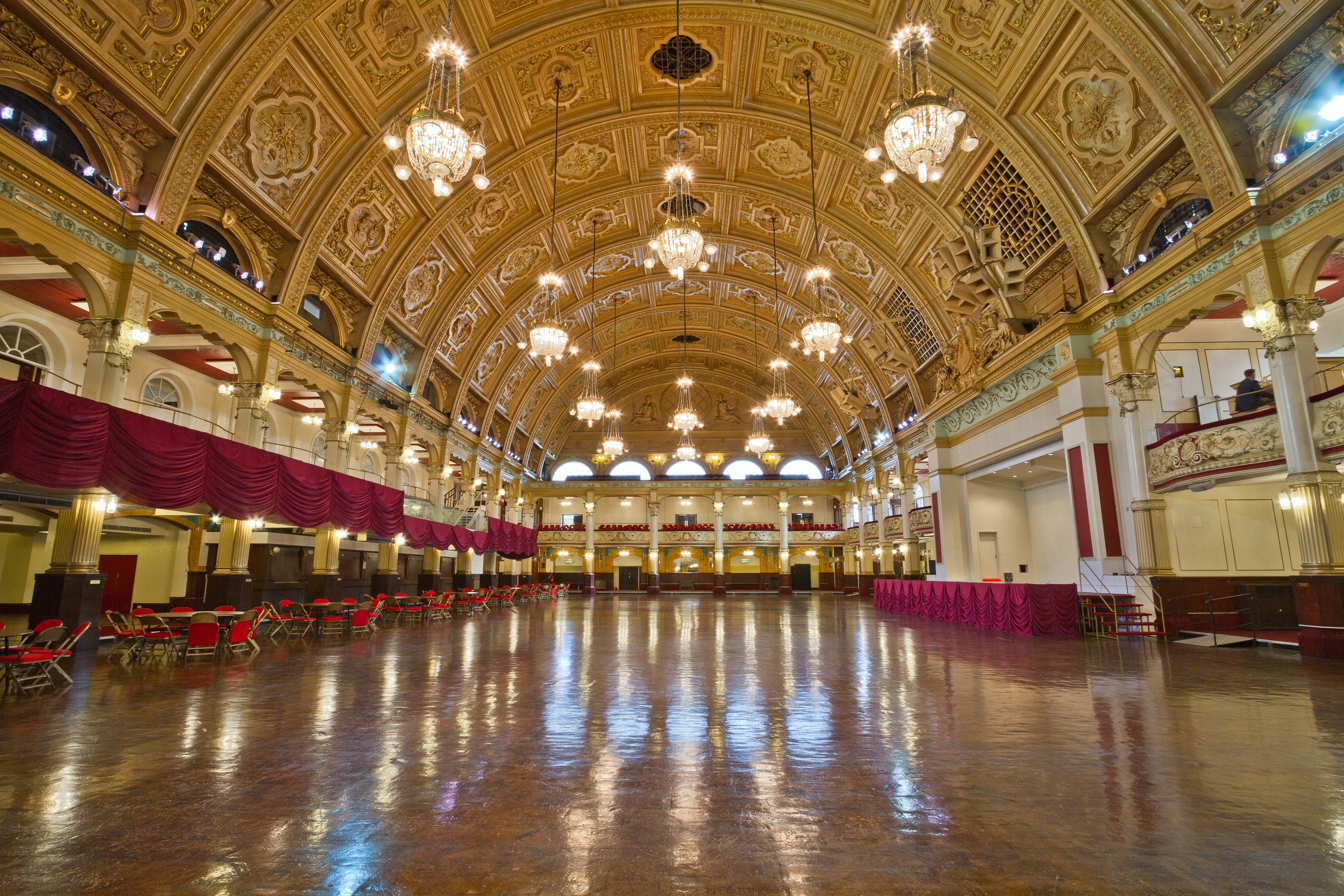
Empress Ballroom

The Empress Ballroom was built in 1896. With a floor area of 12,500 square feet (1,160 sq. metres), the ballroom was one of the largest in the world. It was requisitioned by the Admiralty in 1918 for military use during World War I, before being handed back a year later. The ballroom hosted the first Blackpool Dance Festival in 1920. It was re-floored in 1934.

In the late 1970s, some of the floor space was adapted for other purposes to reduce the venue's over-capacity. It was renamed The Stardust Garden and was intended to function as a nightclub.

The ballroom has been used as a conference venue for many years by the Labour Party Conference, Conservative Party Conference and Liberal Democrat Conference, although they have increasingly used modern, purpose-built conference centres in the 21st century.

The ballroom hosts the World Matchplay darts tournament, the Blackpool Dance Festival and the Inter Varsity Dance Competition.

Acts such as Pet Shop Boys, the Beatles, Queen, Oasis, Radiohead, Slash and The White Stripes have performed in the ballroom. The White Stripes perform at The Empress Ballroom in their DVD and concert Under Blackpool Lights.

It also housed a 3/14 Wurlitzer organ, much of the pipework coming from the original Blackpool Tower organ. It was played for many years by Horace Finch but was removed in 1969, eventually being broken up. A new Wurlitzer organ has more recently been installed in the Empress Ballroom by Cannock Chase Organ Club. The original console has survived and will hopefully be used in the future.

==== Pavilion Theatre ====
The Pavilion dates back to the original 1878 build, when it was built as a promenade pavilion. In 1885, a new proscenium and private boxes were added. It was then converted to a theatre in 1889. It was extensively altered in 1897 when the floor was lowered and tilted towards the stage. In the 1930s, it was also used as a cinema showing talkies. After the cinema ceased operation, the Pavilion was used for Concerts & Shows until its refurbishment in the 1990s, when it was gutted leaving just the stage area intact, the back stage area is now a Restaurant and the seating area has been taken into the Horseshoe as an Exhibition space. The Pavilion theatre today has a capacity of 600. It is situated in the centre of the Horseshoe – a semi-circular promenade providing a spacious self-contained exhibition area.

==== Arena ====
The Arena is adjacent to the Empress Ballroom. Built in 1896, it was originally known as the Indian Lounge because of its British Raj-inspired interior design created by J.M. Boekbinder. The lounge was remodelled as the Planet Room, a cabaret bar in 1964. It was again revamped in the 1980s in a Roman style and renamed the Arena.

The Arena is now used as a venue in its own right for meetings, presentations and banquets or as an extension space for the Empress Ballroom. It has a capacity of between 220 and 600.

==== Olympia ====
Construction of the Olympia exhibition hall began in 1929 and it took eight months to build. It opened in June 1930, and the interior comprised stalls and attractions designed by film set designer Andrew Mazzei in the form of a Moorish village. The Olympia's exterior was finished in white faience and included a dome which was removed after World War II. During the war, the Olympia was used to teach morse code.

The Olympia later found use as a funfair until the 1980s when it was adapted to a more modern indoor adventure playground called Professor Peabody's Playplace.

The venue covers 2,600 square metres and is now used as a venue for exhibitions and trade shows, with a capacity of up to 3,500.

=== First floor ===
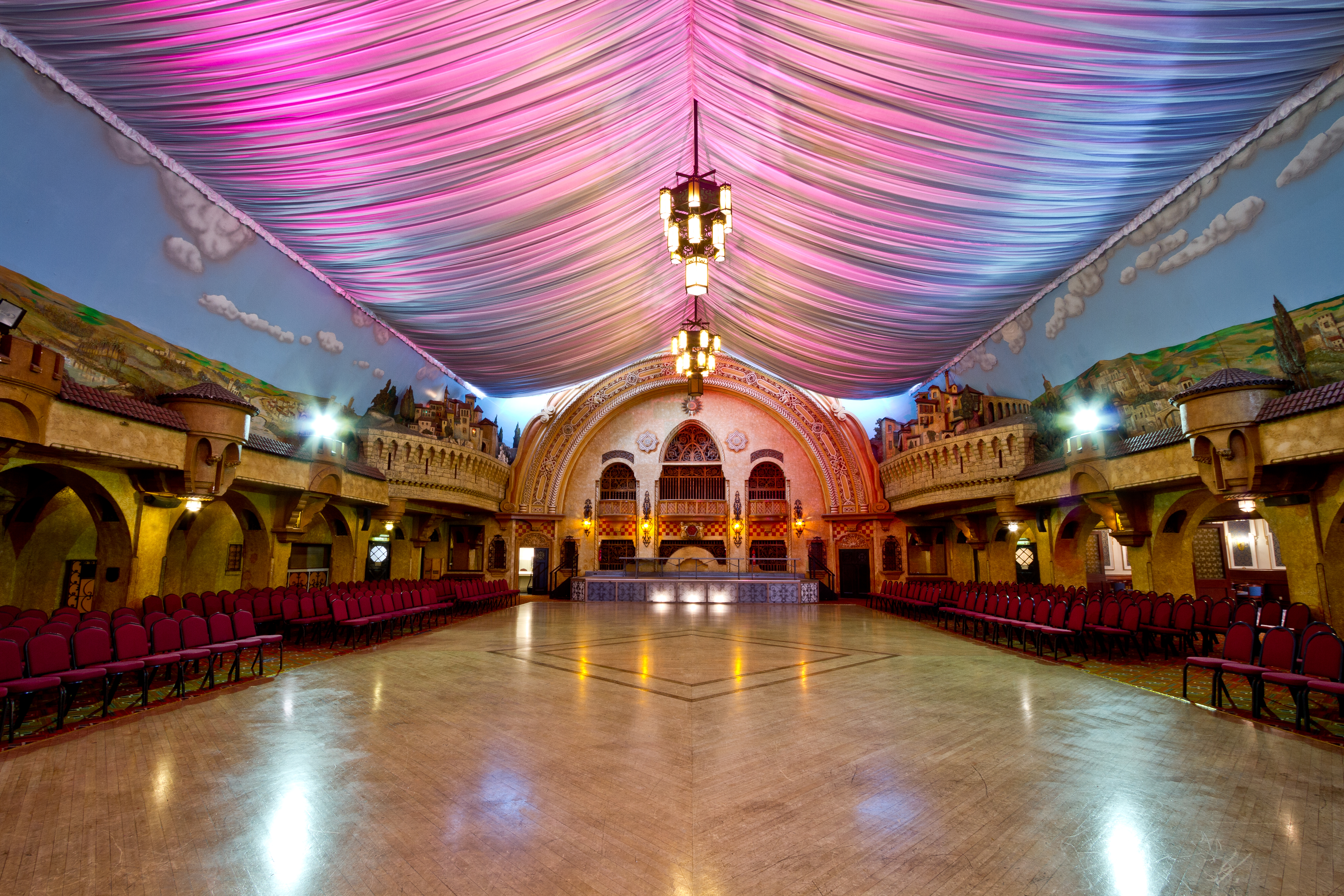
Spanish Hall

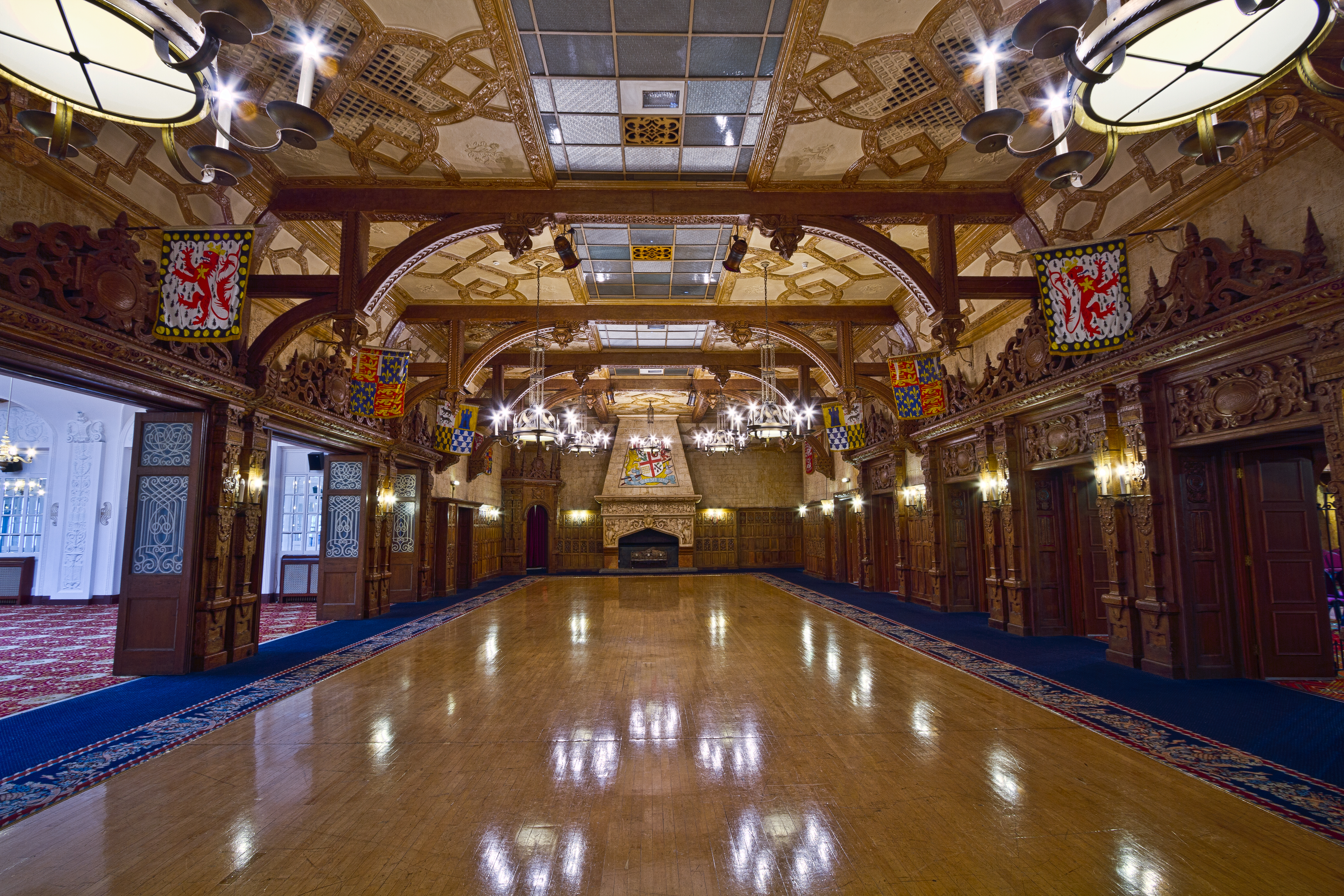
Baronial Hall

==== Spanish Hall ====
The Spanish Hall is a large Andalucian style vaulted hall with battlemented balconies containing three-dimensional representations of clustered Spanish villages. It held the quarterly conventions of the George Formby Society for twenty years from 1989 to 2009. It was also designed by Andrew Mazzei. A floor was constructed in the Winter Gardens' Victoria Street entrance to allow the creation of the hall.

The Spanish Hall, which has undergone a £1 million refurbishment, is used for banquets and wedding receptions. It is self-contained with its own adjacent bar, the Windsor Bar and has a capacity of up to 1,000.

==== Baronial Hall ====
The Baronial Hall, added in 1931, is designed in the guise of a medieval castle. It is used for weddings and banquets with a capacity of up to 300.

==== Renaissance Hall ====
The Renaissance Hall was added in 1931 and is a period-style room. It has been used as a high-class restaurant and cocktail bar. It has a capacity of up to 275.
