= Ninon Dubois Le Clerc =

French ballerina and courtesan

Ninon Dubois Le Clerc or Ninon Leclaire (1750 in France – 4 May 1779 in Stockholm), was a French ballerina and courtesan. She was a member of the Royal Swedish Ballet and regarded as one of the stars of the royal ballet during her career there. As a courtesan she was known for her relationship with the Russian ambassador Ivan Simolin and the poet Johan Henric Kellgren, who wrote a poem in lamentation over her death in consumption.

== Sources ==
- Gunilla Roempke (1994): Vristens makt – dansös i mätressernas tidevarv. Stockholm: Stockholm Fischer & Co. ISBN 91-7054-734-3
- Carl Forsstrand (1911): Sophie Hagman och hennes samtida. Några anteckningar från det gustavianska Stockholm. Andra Upplagan. Wahlström & Widstrand, Stockholm
- Anna Ivarsdotter Johnsson, Leif Jonsson: Musiken i Sverige. Frihetstiden och Gustaviansk tid 1720-1810
- Klas Ralf (1973): Operan 200 år. Jubelboken. Prisma
