= Théâtre des Variétés-Amusantes =

Coordinates: 48.8686°N 2.3600°E

The Théâtre des Variétés-Amusantes (French pronunciation: [teɑtʁ de vaʁjete amyzɑ̃t]) was a theatre company in Paris.

== History ==
In 1778, Louis Lécluse (or Lécluze), a former actor at the Opéra-Comique turned dentist, opened a theatre at foire Saint-Laurent, which shortly afterwards he transferred to the boulevard du Temple, at the corner of rue de Lancry and rue de Bondy (now rue René-Boulanger, Xe arrondissement).

Unable to bear the hostility this new enterprise generated, Lécluse ceded his theatre and its company to three former dancers of the Opéra – Fierville fils, Malter and Hamoir – as well as the financier Lemercier. The theatre opened on 12 April 1779 and it attracted large audiences by its varied and well-performed repertoire. Dorvigny wrote several plays for it, including Janot ou les Battus paient l'amende (11 June 1779), which was a great success.

In 1784, the theatre's directors had their privilege revoked by a Conseil d'État decree, in favour of Gaillard and Dorfeuille, after a complaint from the Académie royale de Musique. The new directors moved the theatre to the Palais-Royal and opened their new building on 1 January 1785, under the name Variétés du Palais-Royal. Its fare until that date had been farces, which they replaced with comedies, welcoming Monvel and Julie Candeille, then Talma, Dugazon and Mme Vestris. From then on the theatre was renamed the Théâtre-Français de la rue Richelieu, then the Théâtre de la République.
