= Dance Master UK =

Dance Master UK is a dance competition held annually in the United Kingdom.

== Overview ==
Dance Master UK was established in the late 1990s by the International Dance Teachers Association, as the male equivalent of their long running competition Miss Dance of Great Britain. Dance Master UK is a theatre dance competition for boys held annually in the UK with a national final held at the Winter Gardens in Blackpool, England. The finals also include the judging of Miss Dance of Great Britain, and the International Ballet Championships.

=== Qualifying ===
Entrants who wish to compete in the national finals of Dance Master, must first qualify for the competition by winning a regional heat. Heats are held at dance festivals nationwide throughout the year. The majority of these festivals are independently run and must apply to the IDTA in order to stage a heat of Dance Master.

To enter a regional heat, competitors must be aged 16 years or over on the day of the competition and must be amateur dancers or be in full-time training. Professional dancers are not permitted to enter.

In the heats, each competitor performs a three-minute solo dance in a modern theatre or cabaret style. This may include jazz, tap, song, dialogue, instrumentation or comedy, with dance as the dominant discipline. Classical Ballet, character dance or national dance styles are not permitted. The IDTA requests that competitors present a solo that has been specially choreographed for the competition. Should a competitor win their regional heat, they must perform the same solo, without changes, at the national final.

To qualify for the national finals, a competitor must win their heat with a score of 85 marks or more, and they then represent that festival at the finals. A runner-up place is also awarded and the runner-up may compete at the national finals if they have scored a qualifying mark and only if the heat winner is unable to compete. It is very common for dancers to compete in numerous regional heats throughout the country in order to qualify for the national finals.

=== The Finals ===
The national finals of Dance Master are organised by the IDTA and are held annually at the Winter Gardens in Blackpool. During the finals, the competitors compete in a series of dance-offs, judged by a panel of specialist adjudicators. This narrows down the number of competitors to a selection of 7 finalists. The finalists then perform again for the judges in the grand final and the winner of the Dance Master title is awarded.

The winner of Dance Master UK receives a trophy and a cash prize, with trophies also being awarded for the runner-up and 3rd places. The winner holds the title for one year, until a new winner is chosen the following year. The title holder may compete to retain the title, but do not automatically qualify for a place at the national finals.

Being a prestigious competition, the winner of Dance Master will normally enjoy a number of other benefits including dancing at various IDTA seminars and events, and being invited to perform at the IDTA's annual showcase gala at a major UK theatre.

== Grand Final Winners ==
2022

Winner - Scott Millar - Sharon Wood School of Dance and Drama

Runner up - Max Penfold

3rd Place - Jake Kitching

2019

Winner - Harrison Smallman - Jelli Studios

Runner up - Daniel Richards - Splinters Dance Studio

3rd Place - Jack Skelton - BAD

2018

Winner - Harry Wilson - Scott Stevenson School

Runner up - Harrison Smallman - Jelli Studios.

3rd Place - James Wilkinson Jones - Nadine's Dance Company

2017

Winner - Kieran Price - Tabs Studios

Runner up - Ashley Chafer - Marilyn baker school of dance.

3rd Place - James Wilkinson Jones - Nadine's Dance Company

2016

Winner - Arron Hough - sk dance

Runner up - James Buckley - Adele Taylor

=== 2015 ===
- Winner - Reece Woodier Tabs studios
- Runner Up - Benjamin Holloway "Adele Taylor School of Dance"
- 3rd Place - Michael Brown Kathleen Knox school of dance

=== 2014 ===
- Winner - Rhys Yeomans
- Runner Up - Nathan Johnson nadines dance company
- 3rd Place - 'Benjamin Holloway "Adele Taylor School of Dance"

=== 2013 ===
- Winner - Joseph Burridge
- Runner Up - Jamal Wolfe
- 3rd Place - Samual Wall

=== 2012 ===
- Winner - Stephen Garrity from Thornton academy of Dance Studios, Middlesbrough
- Runner Up - Samual Wall
- 3rd Place - Nathan Colman

=== 2011 ===
- Winner - Rio Samuels of the Dawn Dawson Academy of Dance and Dolphin Dance Studios
- Runner Up - Connor MacLeod of the Georgie School of Theatre Arts
- 3rd Place - Dex Lee of the Morgan Aslanoff School

=== 2010 ===
- Winner - Matthew Koon of the Centre Pointe School of Dance
- Runner Up - Josh Kinsella of Phil Winston's Theatreworks
- 3rd Place - Connor McLeod of the Georgie School of Theatre Arts

=== 2009 ===
- Winner - Billy George of the Armley School of Dance
- Runner Up - John Stevenson Janice Wilsons school of dance
- 3rd Place - Will Botting of the Premier Dance Academy

=== 2008 ===
- Winner -

‘’’ Danny Rowe ‘’’ - of ‘’Lumsdale Theatre Arts’’

=== 2007 ===
- Winner - Andrew Wragg Amersall School Of Dance

=== 2005 ===
- Winner - Joseph Connor of the Dupont Dance Stage School
- Runner Up - Craig Moffat
- 3rd Place - Matthew Croke of the Maureen Law & Sharon Berry Schools

== Sources ==
- Dance Master UK - 2008 Winner
