= Maelbeek Valley Garden =

Park in Brussels, Belgium

- Jardin de la vallée du Maelbeek (French); Maalbeekdaltuin (Dutch)
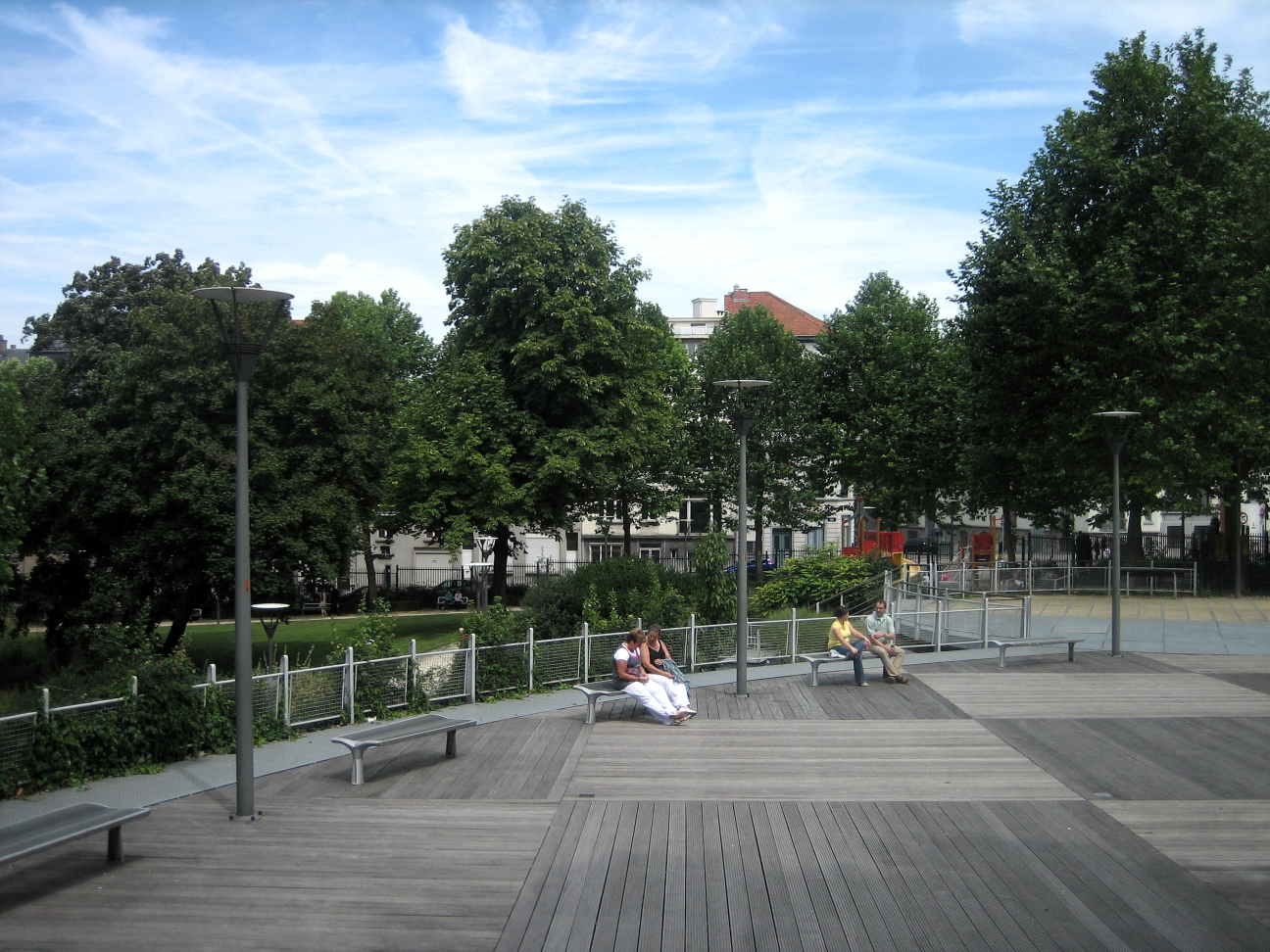
- View north from raised decking area
- Interactive map of Maelbeek Valley Garden
- Type: Public park
- Location: City of Brussels, Brussels-Capital Region, Belgium
- Coordinates: 50°50′38″N 4°22′43″E
- Created: 13 May 1951
- Status: Open year-round
- Public transit: 1 5 Maelbeek/Maalbeek

Maelbeek Valley Garden (French: Jardin de la vallée du Maelbeek; Dutch: Maalbeekdaltuin), also known as Maelbeek Garden (French: Jardin du Maelbeek; Dutch: Maalbeektuin), is a small green space on the corner of the Rue de la Loi/Wetstraat and the Chaussée d'Etterbeek/Etterbeeksesteenweg at the heart of the European Quarter of Brussels, Belgium. It was inaugurated on 13 May 1951.

The park is testimony to the local residents' struggle against the rapid urbanisation (also known as Brusselisation) in the quarter, which lacked urban planning and new green spaces. The site was originally destined to be used for a new headquarters for the Council of the European Union (which eventually moved into the Justus Lipsius building across the road), but in the face of unanimous opposition, the Belgian government tried to sell what was then a temporary car park to property developers before it was converted into a local park.

A miniature river in the park reflects the Maelbeek stream, which once flowed through the area, but is now channelled through an underground collector.

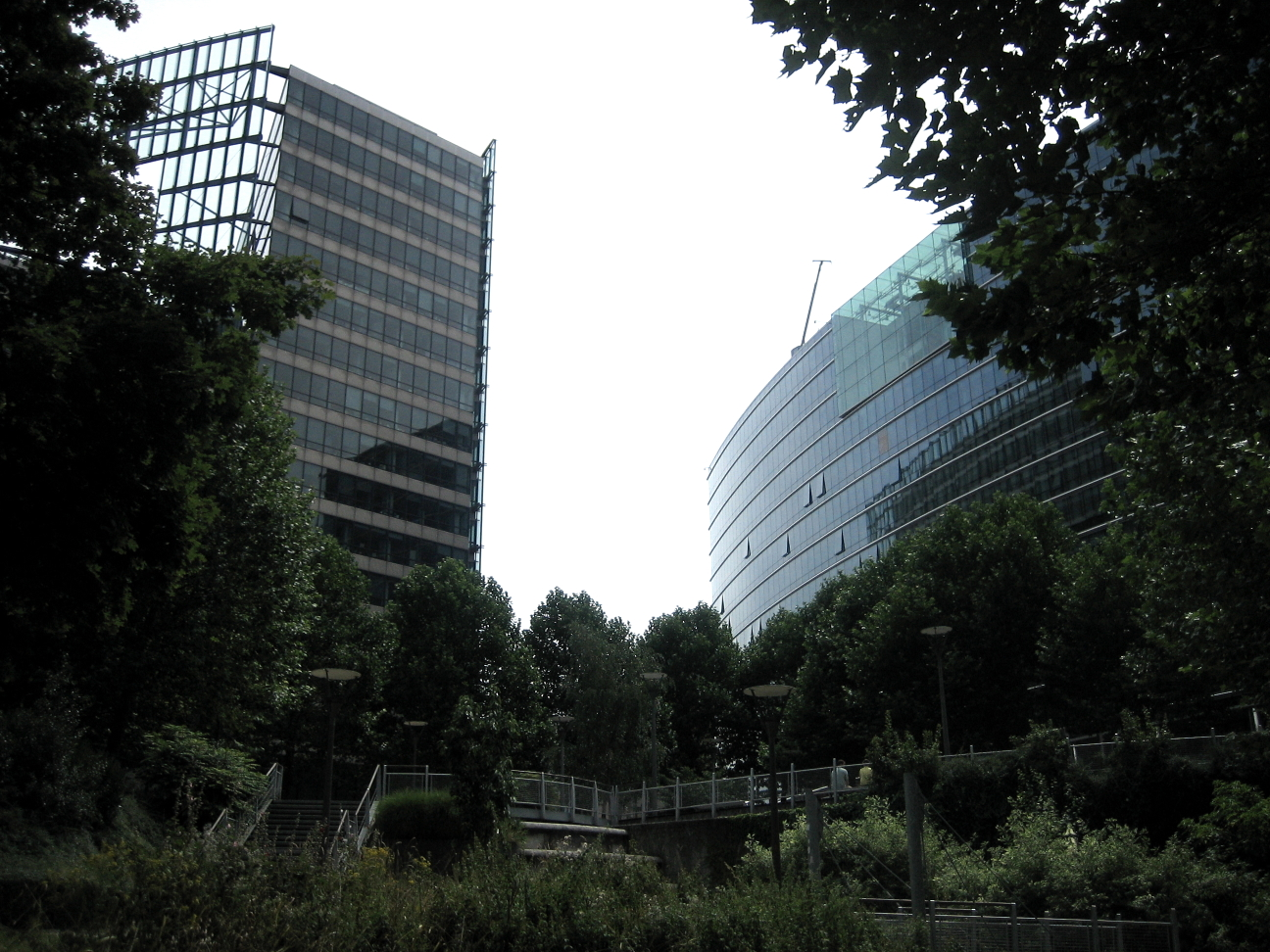
Looking towards the Rue de la Loi/Wetstraat, the Charlemagne (left) and Lex (right) buildings over the park

== See also ==
- List of parks and gardens in Brussels
- History of Brussels
