= Justus Lipsius building =

Building in Brussels, Belgium

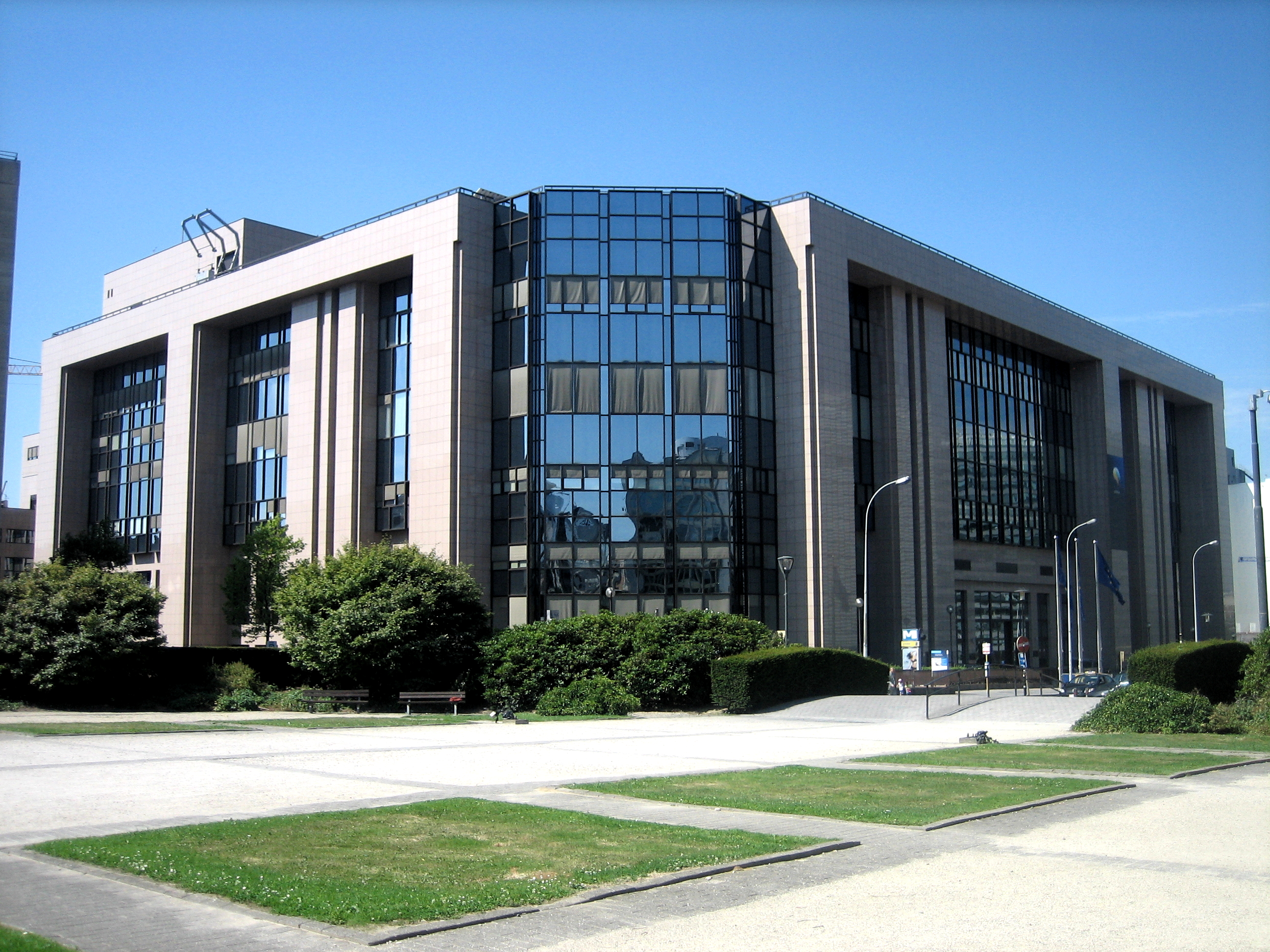
- The Justus Lipsius building in Brussels, seen from the Robert Schuman Roundabout
- Interactive map of the Justus Lipsius building area

General information
- Type: Office building
- Location: Rue de la Loi / Wetstraat 175, 1040 City of Brussels, Brussels-Capital Region, Belgium
- Coordinates: 50°50′29″N 4°22′53″E
- Construction started: 1989
- Completed: 1995
- Owner: General Secretariat of the Council of the European Union

Technical details
- Floor area: 227,278 m^{2} (2,446,400 sq ft)

The Justus Lipsius building, located in the European Quarter of Brussels, Belgium, was the headquarters of the Council of the European Union from 1995, and the de facto home of the European Council from 2002 (de jure as of 2004), until their relocation to the adjacent newly constructed Europa building at the beginning of 2017.

The building, which has a gross surface area of 227,278 m^{2} (2,446,400 sq ft), still provides for additional meeting rooms, office space and press facilities for both institutions. It consists of seventeen conference rooms with at least ten interpretation booths each, five other meeting rooms and two rooms for official meals. It also provides 40,048 m^{2} (431,070 sq ft) of offices for both institutions' shared General Secretariat. An onsite press centre is also featured, which can be extended during summits with up to 600 seats in the atrium. It is linked, via means of two skyways and a service tunnel, to the Europa building.

== Location ==
The building is located in the European Quarter at 175, rue de la Loi/Wetstraat, next to the Robert Schuman Roundabout and opposite the Berlaymont building (the headquarters of the European Commission). To the west is the Europa building. To the south the building borders the Place Jean Rey/Jean Reyplein and Leopold Park. The façade bordering the square is being considered for renovation to improve the building's appearance. Transport links to the building include Schuman station, which provides metro, as well as, regional, national and international rail services. The station is situated immediately to the north of the Justus Lipsius building.

== History ==
In 1985, in response to an initiative by Belgium, the Council of the European Union appointed the Belgian government's Régie des Bâtiments (English: Buildings Agency) as the contracting authority to construct a new building better suited to its needs. The foundation stone of the new building was laid in 1989. It is situated on land previously owned by the Belgian government, a site formerly crossed by the Rue Juste Lipse/Justus Lipsiusstraat, a street named in honour of Justus Lipsius, a Flemish philologist and humanist. The new structure took the name of the demolished street, which had linked the Rue de la Loi/Wetstraat to the Rue Belliard/Belliardstraat, to become the Justus Lipsius building. Blocs D and E of the former 1920s Résidence Palace were razed to make way for the construction. The official inauguration took place on 29 May 1995, under the French presidency of the Council of the EU. During the construction period, the Council of the EU was housed in the Charlemagne building located across the street, since renovated and currently in use by the European Commission.

From 2002, the European Council also utilised the Justus Lipsius building as its headquarters. This followed an advanced implementation of an agreement by European Union leaders, during ratification of the Nice Treaty, to do so at such a time as the total membership of the EU surpassed 18 member states. Prior to this, summits of the European Council were based in the EU member state that held the rotating presidency of the Council of the EU. A number of renovations were made to the building to accommodate the increased demands of both institutions and growing EU membership, including the conversion of the building's basement car park into additional meeting rooms. However, at the beginning of 2017 both institutions moved into a new purpose-built seat in the adjacent Europa building. The Justus Lipsius building is still utilised by both institutions and is linked via two skyways and a service tunnel to the new venue.

== See also ==
- Breydel building
- Espace Léopold (Brussels seat of the European Parliament)
- Lex building
- Madou Plaza Tower
- Brussels and the European Union
- Institutional seats of the European Union
