= Rue de la Loi =

Street in Brussels, Belgium

Rue de la Loi (French); Wetstraat (Dutch)
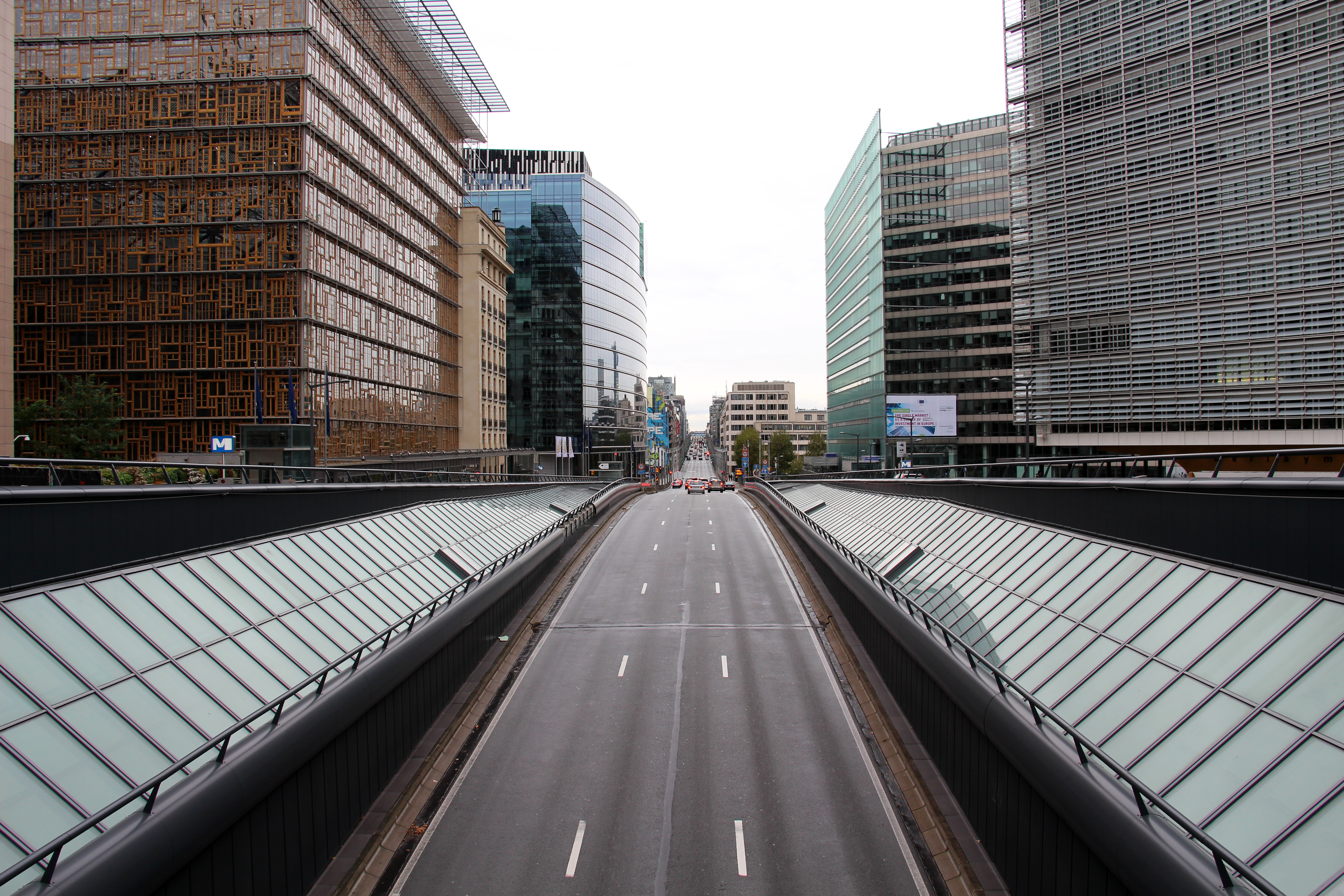
- The Rue de la Loi/Wetstraat looking west from over the Belliard Tunnel

- Location within Brussels Location within Belgium
- Type: Street
- Location: City of Brussels, Brussels-Capital Region, Belgium
- Quarter: Leopold Quarter
- Postal code: 1000, 1040, 1049
- Coordinates: 50°50′39″N 4°22′31″E

The Rue de la Loi (French, pronounced [ʁy d(ə) la lwa]) or Wetstraat (Dutch, pronounced [ˈʋɛtstraːt]), meaning "Law Street", is a major street running through central and eastern Brussels, Belgium, which is home to several notable Belgian and European Union (EU) governmental buildings. The road runs from the Rue Royale/Koningsstraat in central Brussels to the Robert Schuman Roundabout in its European Quarter. It forms the first (westerly) part of the N3 road that runs to Aachen, Germany.

The terms Rue de la Loi in French or Wetstraat in Dutch are used metonymically for government in Belgian politics and media because the Belgian Federal Parliament building (Palace of the Nation) stands at the beginning of this street and the office of the Prime Minister is located adjacent to this building, at number 16. It is also where the Council of Ministers holds its meetings.

At the far end, next to the Schuman Roundabout, are the Berlaymont building of the European Commission, the Europa building of the European Council and Council of the European Union, and the Parc du Cinquantenaire/Jubelpark beyond that. Shortly before the roundabout is the exit ramp from the tunnel under the roundabout and Cinquantenaire.

== History ==
The Rue de la Loi was laid out by the French architect Gilles-Barnabé Guimard in his overall project of Brussels Park and its surroundings, in order to link the Rue Royale/Koningsstraat to the Rue Ducale/Hertogstraat on the northern side of the park. This section was originally called the Rue de Brabant/Brabantstraat ("Brabant Street") because of the neoclassical palace that was built there from 1779 to 1783, opposite the park's main entrance on that side, to accommodate the meetings of the Council of Brabant (see Palace of the Nation). The street acquired its current name in 1797, under the French regime.

The road was redeveloped into a higher capacity one-way thoroughfare in 1969 with the first metro line being built under it, along with two decks of underground parking between the metro line and the road. In 2001, it was proposed that one of the five traffic lanes should be removed and the pavements widened to include cyclepaths. This, together with an overall facelift, was completed on 7 September 2003. Immediately, there were calls for the reversal of traffic flow (see redevelopment below).

== Buildings ==
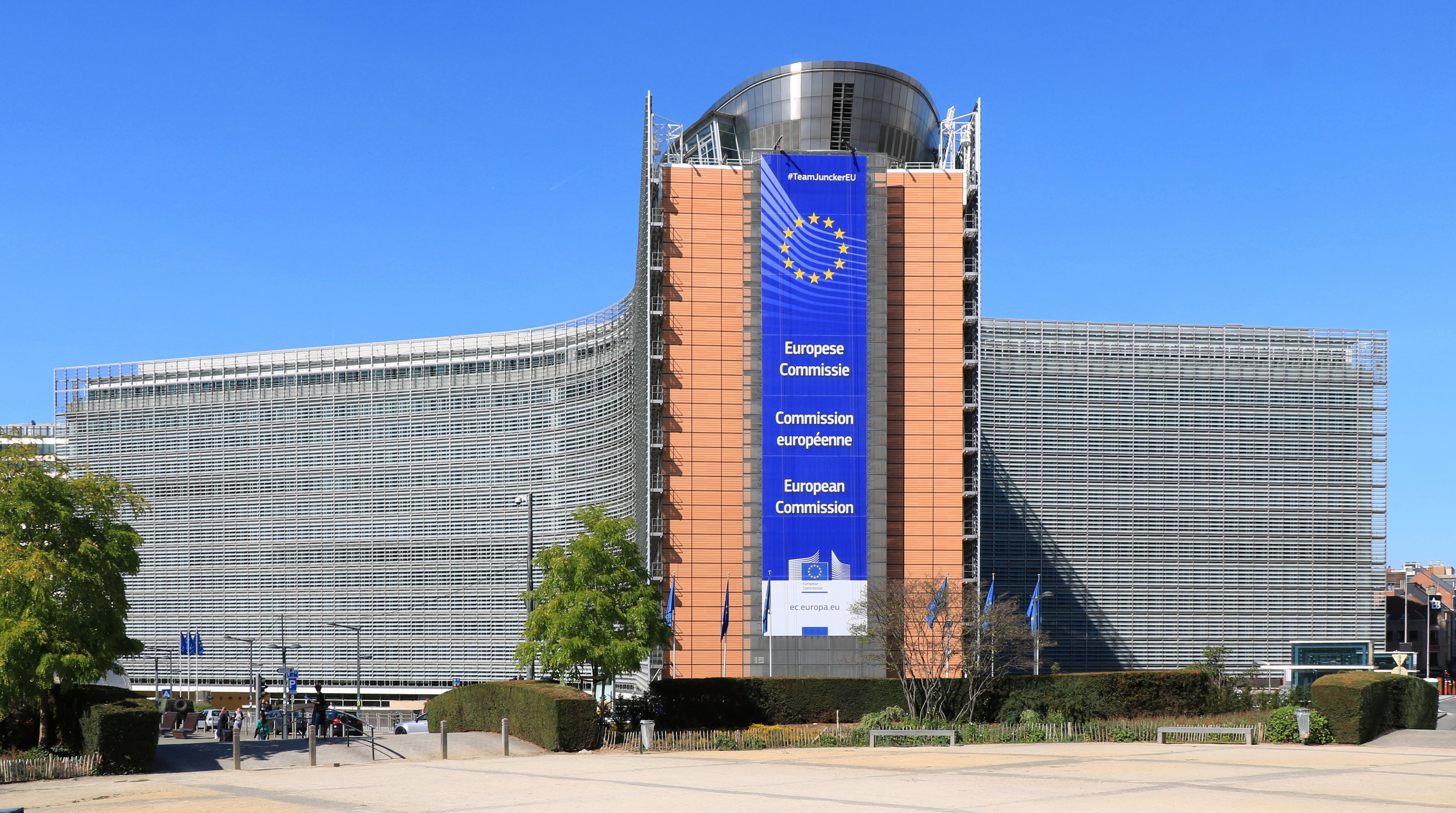
The Berlaymont building (European Commission), Rue de la Loi/Wetstraat 200

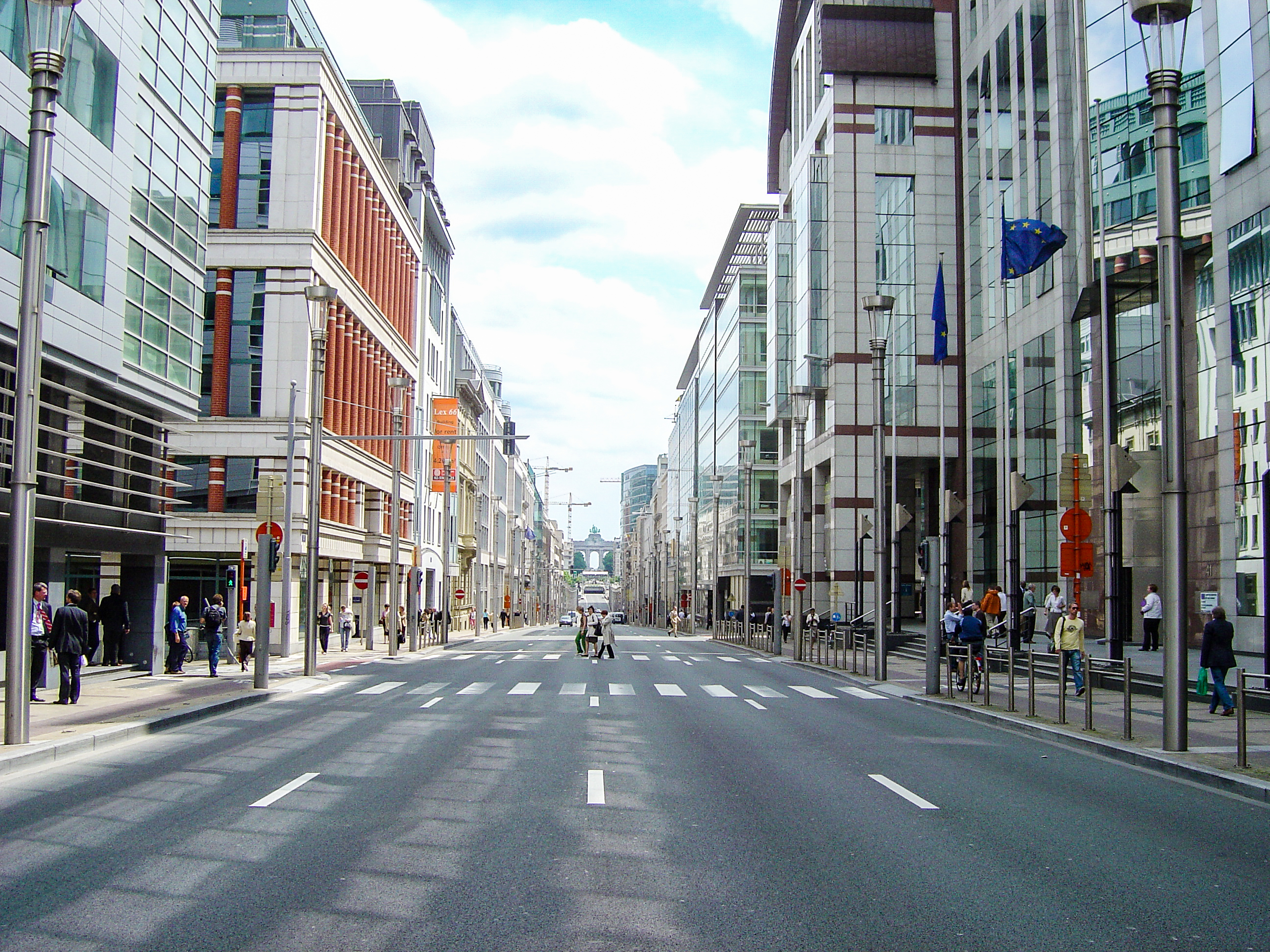
View looking west towards the Parc du Cinquantenaire/Jubelpark

The street starts as a continuation of the Rue des Colonies/Koloniënstraat at the crossroads with the Rue Royale/Koningsstraat. Immediately to the south is Parc/Park metro station and Brussels Park. To the north is the Belgian Parliament building, the Palace of the Nation. The Royal Park Theatre is also situated there.

- No. 9: House of Hungary
- No. 10: Office of the president of the Belgian Federal Chamber of Representatives
- No. 16 (north): Official seat of the Prime Minister of Belgium, colloquially called Law Street 16 (French: 16, rue de la Loi, Dutch: Wetstraat 16)
- ~ Avenue des Arts/Kunstlaan (Small Ring) and Arts-Loi/Kunst-Wet metro station (lines 1, 2, 5 and 6)
- No. 41 (south): European Commission (DEVCO)
- No. 44 (north): Touring Club Royal de Belgique
- No. 56 (north): European Commission
- ~ No. 2 rue de Spa/Spastraat (north): European Commission (Note: Buildings situated on the corner of the Rue de la Loi and the Rue de Spa, registered on the Rue de Spa, so there is no fixed number for the Rue de la Loi. They sit around the 70 mark.)
- ~ No. 3 rue de Spa/Spastraat (north): European Commission
- No. 86 (north): European Commission
- No. 71 (south): Thon Hotel
- No. 89: CD&V headquarters (largest Belgian political party between 1945 and 2010)
- No. 102 (north): European Commission
- No. 130 (north): European Commission
- ~ Maelbeek/Maalbeek metro station (lines 1 and 5)
- ~ Chaussée d'Etterbeek/Etterbeeksesteenweg
- ~ (north) Jardin du Maelbeek/Maalbeektuin
- No. 145 (south): Lex building, offices of the Council of the European Union
- No. 170 (north): Charlemagne building, foreign affairs departments of the European Commission
- ~ Schuman station (heavy rail)
- No. 155 (south): Europa building, headquarters of the European Council and Council of the European Union
- ~ Belliard Tunnel exit
- No. 200 (north): Berlaymont building, headquarters of the European Commission
- No. 175 (south): Justus Lipsius building, office space for the Council Secretariat and used for low-level Council meetings.
- ~ Schuman station (metro, lines 1 and 5)
- ~ Robert Schuman Roundabout

== See also ==
- List of streets in Brussels
- Rue Belliard/Belliardstraat, a street running parallel to the Rue de la Loi
- History of Brussels
- Belgium in the long nineteenth century
