= Brussels and the European Union =

Status of the city as de facto capital of the EU

Coordinates: 50°50′N 4°23′E

The location of Brussels in Belgium and the European Union (EU)

The flag of the Brussels-Capital Region

Brussels (Belgium) is considered the de facto capital of the European Union, having a long history of hosting a number of principal EU institutions within its European Quarter. The EU has no official capital, but Brussels hosts the official seats of the European Commission, Council of the European Union, and European Council, as well as a seat (officially the second seat) of the European Parliament. In 2013, this presence generated about €250 million (8.3% of the regional GDP) and 121,000 jobs (16.7% of the regional employment). One commonly cited reason for Brussels being regarded as the "capital of the European Union" is its location between France, Germany and the United Kingdom, the three countries whose rivalry played a role in starting the two world wars and whose reconciliation paved the way for European integration.

== History ==
=== Birth of the European Communities ===
In 1951, the leaders of six European countries (Belgium, Luxembourg, Netherlands, France, Italy and West Germany) signed the Treaty of Paris, which created the European Coal and Steel Community (ECSC), and with this new community came the first institutions: the High Authority, Council of Ministers, Court of Justice and Common Assembly. A number of cities were considered, and Brussels would have been accepted as a compromise, but the Belgian government put all its effort into backing Liège (Wallonia), opposed by all the other members, and was unable to formally back Brussels due to internal instability.

Agreement remained elusive and a seat had to be found before the institutions could begin work, hence Luxembourg was chosen as a provisional seat, though with the Common Assembly in Strasbourg as that was the only city with a large enough hemicycle (the one used by the Council of Europe). This agreement was temporary, and plans were set to relocate the institutions to Saarbrücken (Germany), which would serve as a "European District", but this did not occur. (Note: The plan was that it would be a "European district" between France and Germany, and institutions would move when the status was agreed. But three years later Saarbrücken voted massively to rejoin West Germany, cancelling the European district plan and maintaining Luxembourg's position.)

The 1957 Treaty of Rome established two new communities: the European Economic Community (EEC) and the European Atomic Energy Community (Euratom). These shared the Assembly and Court of the ECSC but created two new sets of Councils and Commissions (equivalent to the ECSC's High Authority). Discussions on the seats of the institutions were left until the last moment before the treaties came into force, so as not to interfere with ratification.

Brussels waited until only a month before talks to enter its application, which received unofficial backing by several member states. The members agreed in principle to locate the executives, Councils, and the assembly in one city, though could still not decide which city, so they put the decision off for six months. In the meantime, the Assembly would stay in Strasbourg and the new Commissions would meet alternatively at the ECSC seat and at the Château of Val Duchesse, in Brussels (headquarters of a temporary committee). The Councils would meet wherever their Presidents wanted to. In practice, this was at Val Duchesse until autumn 1958 when it moved to central Brussels, at 2, rue Ravenstein/Ravensteinstraat.

=== Installation in Brussels and early development ===
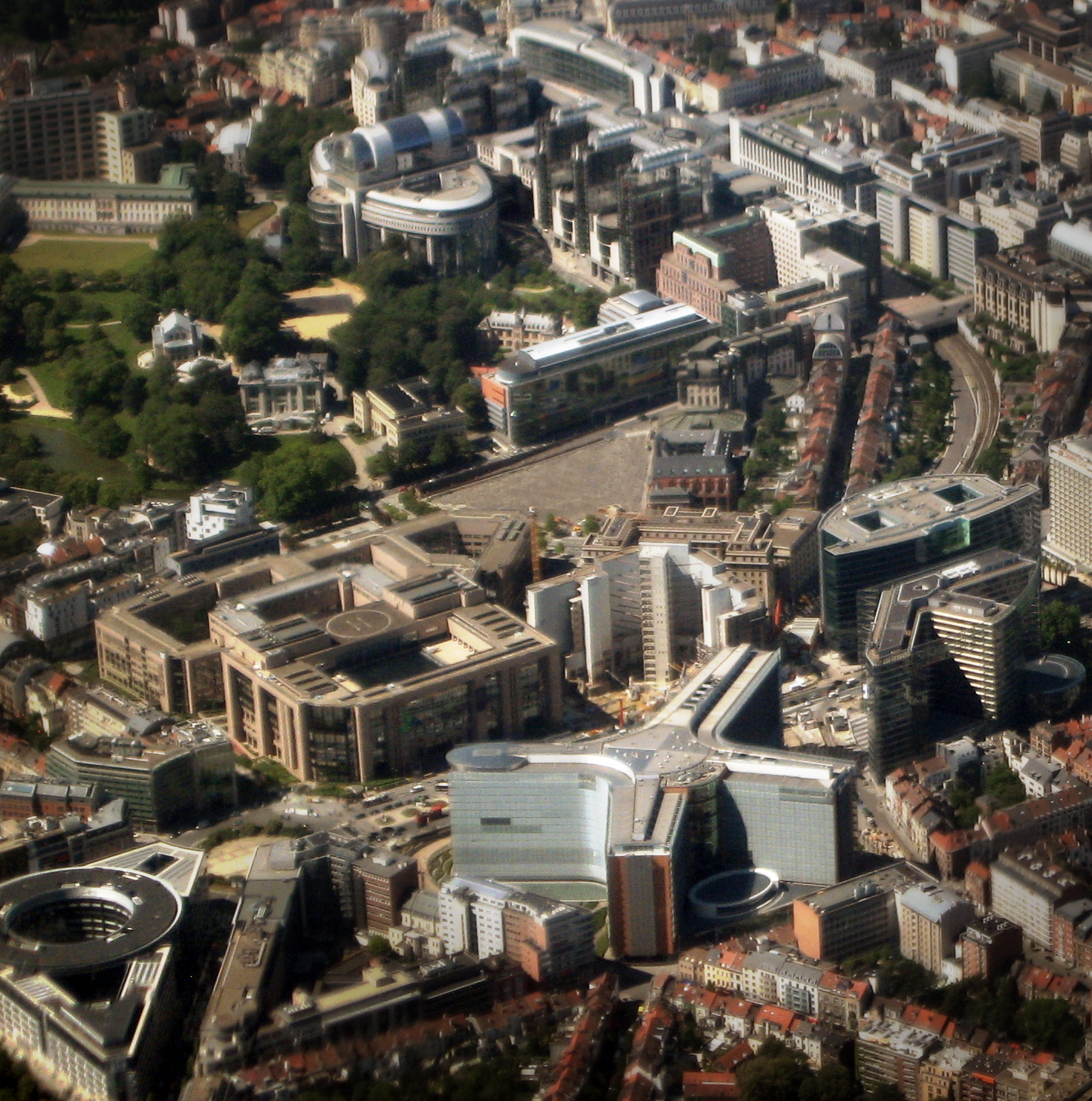
Aerial view of Brussels' European Quarter, hosting most of the EU's institutions

Brussels missed out in its bid for a single seat due to a weak campaign from the Belgian government in negotiations. The government eventually pushed its campaign and started large-scale construction, renting office space in the east of the city for use by the institutions. On 11 February 1958, the six member states' governments concluded an unofficial agreement on the setting-up of community offices. On the principle that it would take two years after a final agreement to prepare the appropriate office space, full services were set up in Brussels in expectation of a report from the Committee of Experts looking into the matter of a final seat.

From 1958, the Commissions' services were grouped together on the Avenue de la Joyeuse Entrée/Blijde Inkomstlaan, a complex which was built in several phases from 1957 to 1963. While waiting for this building's completion, the European administration moved to 51–53, rue Belliard/Belliardstraat on 1 April 1958 (later exclusively used by the Euratom Commission), though with the numbers of European civil servants rapidly expanding, services were set up in buildings on the Rue du Marais/Broekstraat, the Avenue de Broqueville/De Broquevillelaan, the Avenue de Tervueren/Tervurenlaan, the Rue d'Arlon/Aarlenstraat, the Rue Joseph II/Jozef II-straat, the Rue de la Loi/Wetstraat and the Avenue de Kortenberg/Kortenberglaan. The Belgian government further provided newly built offices on the Mont des Arts/Kunstberg (22, rue des Sols/Stuiversstraat) for the Council of Ministers' Secretariat and European Investment Bank.

A Committee of Experts deemed Brussels to be the one option to have all the necessary features for a European capital: a large, active metropolis, without a congested centre or poor quality of housing; good communications with other member states' capitals, including to major commercial and maritime markets; vast internal transport links; an important international business centre; plentiful housing for European civil servants; and an open economy. Furthermore, it was located halfway between France, Germany and the United Kingdom (as in the case of other seats of European institutions), and on the border between the two major European civilisations: Latin and Germanic; and was at the centre of the first post-war integration experiment: the Benelux. As a capital of a small country, it also could not claim to use the presence of institutions to exert pressure on other member states, it being more of a neutral territory between the major European powers. The committee's report was approved of by the Council, Parliament and Commissions, however, the Council was still unable to achieve a final vote on the issue, and hence put off the issue for a further three years, despite all the institutions now leading in moving to Brussels.

The decision was put off due to the varied national positions preventing a unanimous decision. Luxembourg fought to keep the ECSC or have compensation; France fought for Strasbourg; Italy, initially backing Paris, fought for any Italian city to thwart Luxembourg and Strasbourg. Meanwhile, the Parliament passed a series of resolutions complaining about the whole situation of spreading itself across three cities, though unable to do anything about it.

=== Merger Treaty: political and town-planning status quo ===
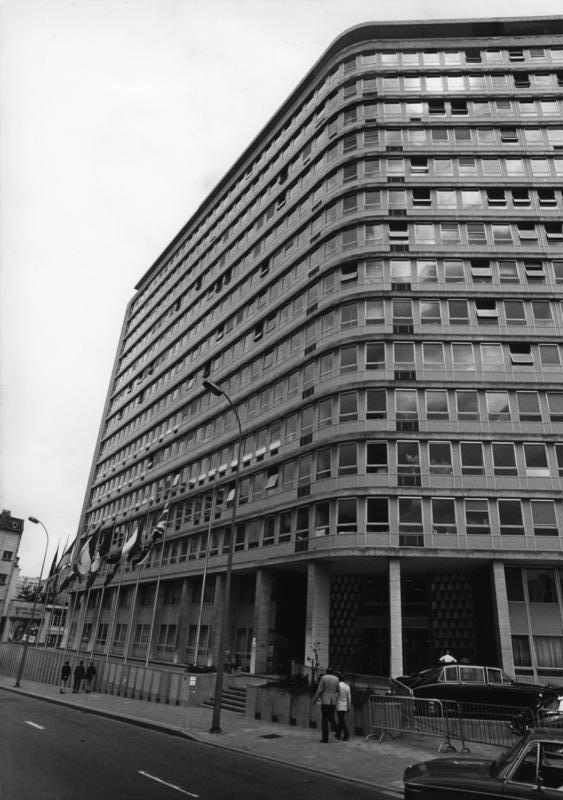
The Charlemagne building (before renovation), headquarters of the Council of the European Union between 1971 and 1995

The 1965 Merger Treaty was seen as an appropriate moment to finally resolve the issue; the separate Commissions and Councils were to be merged. Luxembourg, concerned about losing the High Authority, proposed a split between Brussels and Luxembourg. The Commission and Council were to be located in Brussels, with Luxembourg keeping the Court and Parliamentary Assembly, together with a few of the Commission's departments. This was largely welcomed by the member states, but opposed by France, not wishing to see the Parliament leave Strasbourg, and by the Parliament itself, which wished to be with the executives and was further annoyed by the fact that it was not consulted on the matter of its own location.

Hence, the status quo was maintained with some adjustments; the Commission, with most of its departments, would be in Brussels; as would the Council, except for April, June and October, when it would meet in Luxembourg. In addition, Luxembourg would keep the Court of Justice, some of the Commission's departments and the Secretariat of the European Parliament. Strasbourg would continue to host the Parliament. Joining the Commission was the merged Council's Secretariat. The ECSC's Secretariat merged with the EEC's and EAEC's in the Ravenstein building, which then moved to the Charlemagne building, next to the Berlaymont building, in 1971.

By 1965, the EEC Commission alone had 3,200 staff scattered across eight different cramped buildings, on the Rue Belliard, the Avenue de la Joyeuse Entrée, the Rue du Marais and at the Mont des Arts. The situation, which (due to the lack of large office blocks) began as soon as they arrived, became critical, and the EEC Commission tried to concentrate its staff in a number of rented buildings around the Robert Schuman Roundabout. The first purpose-built building was the Berlaymont building in 1963–1969, designed to house 3,000 officials, which soon proved too small, causing the institution to spread out across the neighbourhood. Yet, despite the agreement to host these institutions in Brussels, its formal status was still unclear, and hence the city sought to strengthen its hand with major investment in buildings and infrastructure (including Schuman metro station). However, these initial developments were sporadic with little town planning and based on speculation (see Brusselisation).

The 1965 agreement was a source of contention for the Parliament, which wished to be closer to the other institutions, so it began moving some of its decision-making bodies, committee and political group meetings to Brussels. In 1983, it went further by symbolically holding a plenary session in Brussels, in the basement of the Mont des Arts Congress Centre. However, the meeting was a fiasco and the poor facilities partly discredited Brussels' aim of being the sole seat of the institutions. Things looked up for Brussels when, in 1985, the Parliament gained its own plenary chamber in the city (on the Rue Wiertz/Wiertzstraat) for some of its part-sessions. This was done unofficially due to the sensitive nature of the Parliament's seat, with the building being constructed as an "international conference centre". When France unsuccessfully challenged the Parliament's half-move to Brussels in the Court of Justice, the Parliament's victory led it to build full facilities in the city.

=== Edinburgh European Council compromise ===
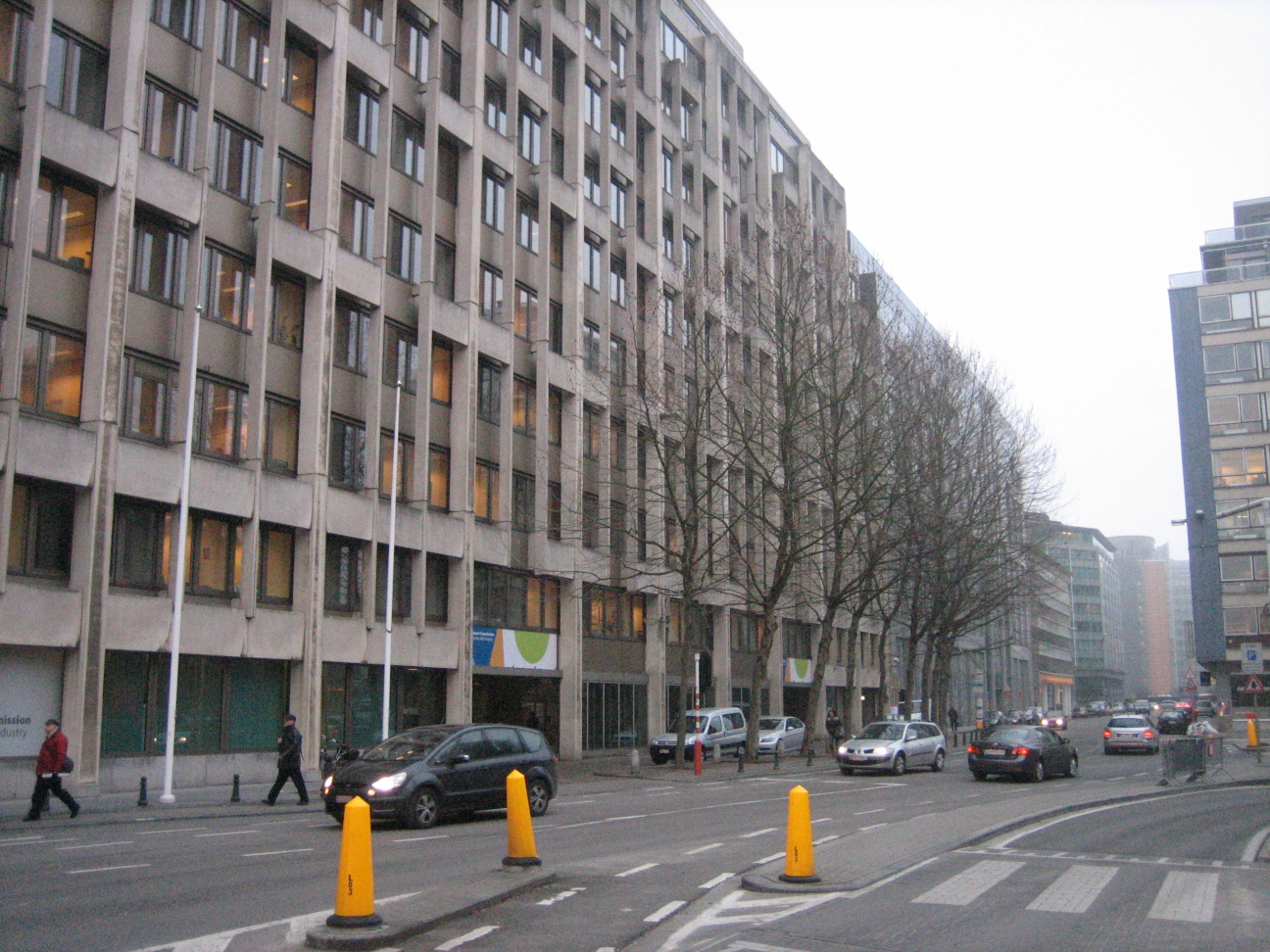
The Breydel building served as the European Commission's headquarters while the Berlaymont was renovated.

In response the Edinburgh European Council of 1992, the EU adopted a final agreement on the location of its institutions. According to this decision, which was subsequently annexed to the Treaty of Amsterdam in 1997, although the Parliament was required to hold some of its sessions, including its budgetary session, in Strasbourg, additional sessions and committees could meet in Brussels. It also reaffirmed the presence of the Commission and Council in the city.

Shortly before this summit, the Commission moved into the Breydel building, at 45, avenue d'Auderghem/Oudergemlaan. This was due to asbestos being discovered in the Berlaymont, forcing its evacuation in 1989. The Commission threatened to move out of the city altogether, which would have destroyed Brussels's chances of hosting the Parliament, so the Belgian government stepped in to build the Breydel building a short distance from the Berlaymont, in only 23 months, ensuring the Commission could move in before the Edinburgh Summit. Shortly after Edinburgh, the Parliament bought its new building in Brussels. With the status of Brussels now clear, NGOs, lobbyists, advisory bodies and regional offices started basing themselves in the quarter near the institutions.

The Council, which had been expanding into further buildings as it grew, consolidated once more in the Justus Lipsius building, and in 2002, it was agreed that the European Council should also be based in Brussels, having previously moved between different cities as the EU's Presidency rotated. From 2004, all Councils were meant to be held in Brussels; however, some extraordinary meetings are still held elsewhere. The reason for the move was in part due to the experience of the Belgian police in dealing with protesters and the fixed facilities in Brussels.

== Status ==
The Commission employs 25,000 people and the Parliament employs about 6,000 people. Because of this concentration, Brussels is a preferred location for any move towards a single seat for Parliament. Despite it not formally being the "capital" of the EU, some commentators see the fact that Brussels enticed an increasing number of the Parliament's sessions to the city, in addition to the main seats of the other two main political institutions, as making Brussels the de facto capital of the EU. Brussels is frequently labelled as the "capital" of the EU, particularly in publications by local authorities, the Commission and press. Indeed, Brussels interprets the 1992 agreement on seats as declaring Brussels as the capital.

There are two further cities hosting major institutions, Luxembourg (judicial and second seats) and Strasbourg (Parliament's main seat). Authorities in Strasbourg and organisations based there also refer to Strasbourg as the "capital" of Europe and Brussels, Strasbourg and Luxembourg are also referred to as the joint capitals of Europe. In 2010, then-Vice President of the United States, Joe Biden, while speaking to the European Parliament, said: "As you probably know, some American politicians and American journalists refer to Washington, D.C. as the 'capital of the free world.' But it seems to me that in this great city, which boasts 1,000 years of history and which serves as the capital of Belgium, the home of the European Union, and the headquarters for NATO, this city has its own legitimate claim to that title."

=== Lobbyists and journalists ===
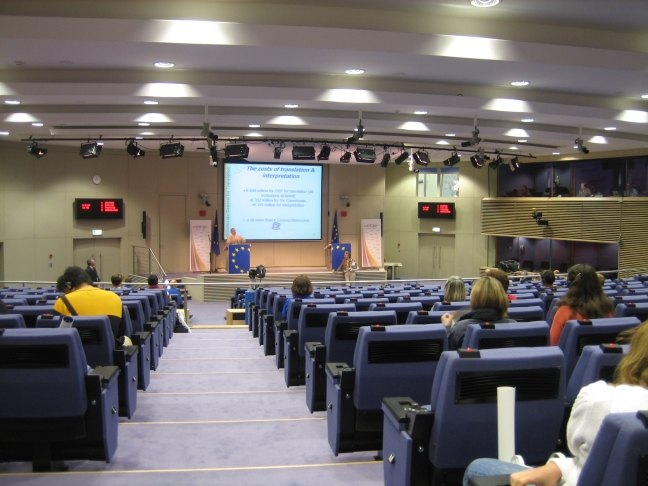
Brussels attracts the most journalists in the world (Commission's press room pictured).

Brussels is a centre of political activity with ambassadors to Belgium, NATO and the EU being based in the city. It hosts 120 international institutions, 181 embassies (intra muros) and more than 2,500 diplomats, making it the second centre of diplomatic relations in the world (after New York City). There is also a greater number of press corps in the city with media outlets in every EU member state having a Brussels correspondent and there are more than 17,000 lobbys registered. The presence of the EU and the other international bodies has, for example, led to there being more ambassadors and journalists in Brussels than in Washington, D.C.

Brussels is third in the number of international conferences it hosts, also becoming one of the largest convention centres in the world. The total number of journalists accredited to the EU institutions was 955 as of late October 2015. This is marginally higher than 2012, when there were 931 reporters, and almost the same as after the enlargement of 2004. In addition to the 955 journalists accredited to the EU, there are 358 technicians (e.g. cameramen, photographers, producers, etc.) bringing the total number of accreditation badges to 1313. Belgium supplies by far the largest share of technicians with 376, with Germany on 143 and France on 105.

=== Accessibility ===
Population density of Europe. Brussels is located between the largest urban centres.

Brussels is located in one of the most urbanised regions of Europe, between Paris, London, the Rhine-Ruhr (Germany), and the Randstad (Netherlands). Via high speed trains, Brussels is around 1hr 25min from Paris, 1hr 50min from London, Amsterdam and Cologne (with adjacent Düsseldorf and the Rhine-Ruhr), and 3hr from Frankfurt. The "Eurocap-rail" project plans to improve Brussels' links to the south to Luxembourg and Strasbourg.

Brussels is the hub of a range of national roads, the main ones being clockwise: the N1 (N to Breda), N2 (E to Maastricht), N3 (E to Aachen), N4 (SE to Luxembourg) N5 (S to Rheims), N6 (S to Maubeuge), N7 (SW to Lille), N8 (W to Koksijde) and N9 (NW to Ostend). The region is skirted by the European route E19 (N-S) and the E40 (E-W), while the E411 leads away to the SE.

Brussels is also served by Brussels Airport, located in the nearby Flemish municipality of Zaventem, and by the smaller Brussels South Charleroi Airport, located near Charleroi (Wallonia), some 50 km (30 mi) from Brussels.

== European Quarter ==
Most of the European Union's Brussels-based institutions are located within its European Quarter (French: Quartier Européen; Dutch: Europese Wijk), which is the unofficial name of the area corresponding to the approximate triangle between Brussels Park, Cinquantenaire Park and Leopold Park (with the European Parliament's hemicycle extending into the latter). The Commission and Council are located on either side of the Rue de la Loi at the heart of this area near Schuman railway station and the Robert Schuman Roundabout.

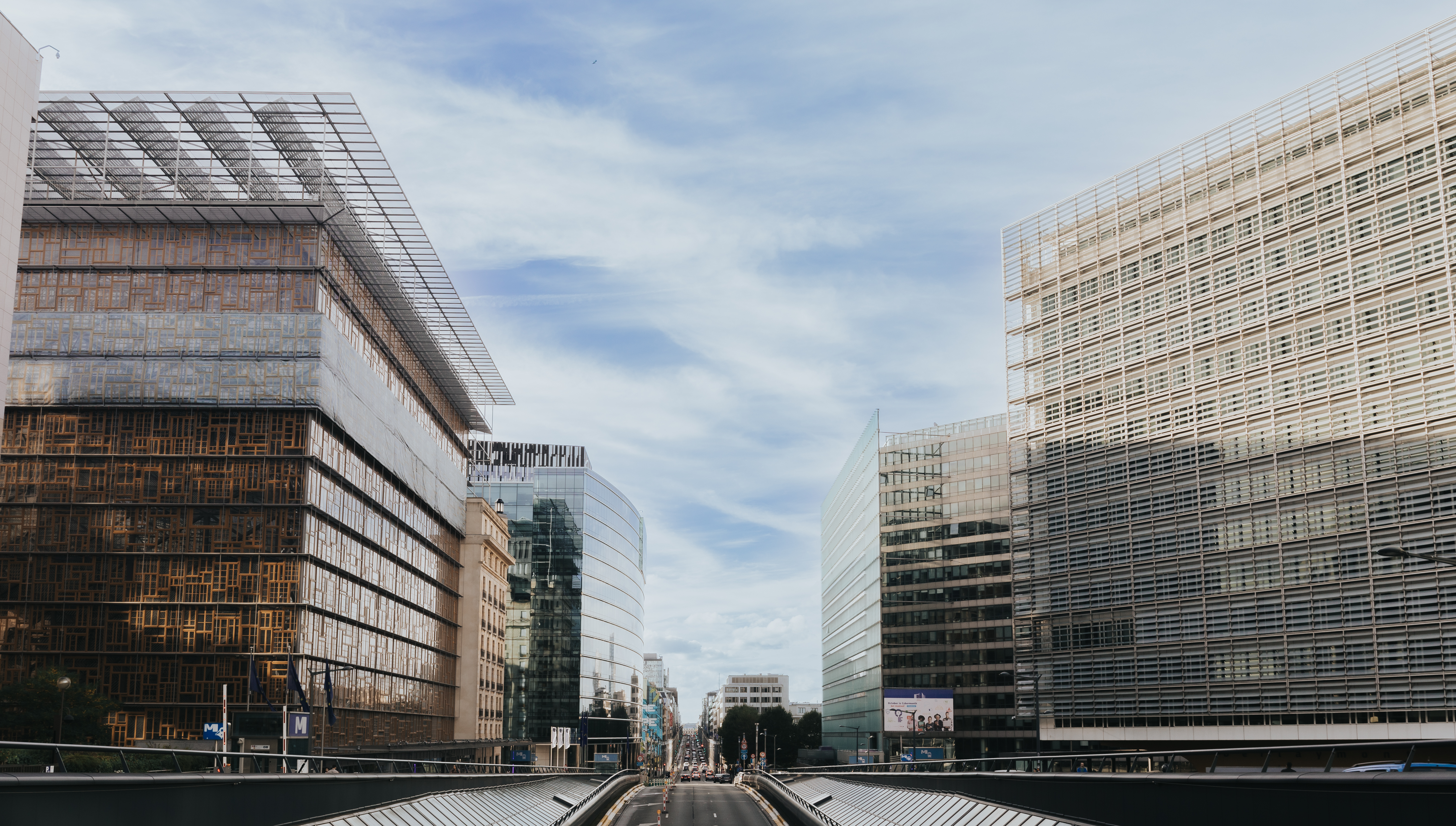
The Rue de la Loi in the European Quarter of Brussels. View of the Europa building (seat of the European Council) on the lefthand side and the Berlaymont building (headquarters of the European Commission) on the righthand side.

The European Parliament is located over Brussels-Luxembourg railway station, next to the Place du Luxembourg/Luxemburgplein. The area, much of which was known as the Leopold Quarter for most of its history, was historically residential, an aspect which was rapidly lost as the institutions moved in, although the change from a residential area to a more office oriented one had already been underway for some time before the arrival of the European institutions.

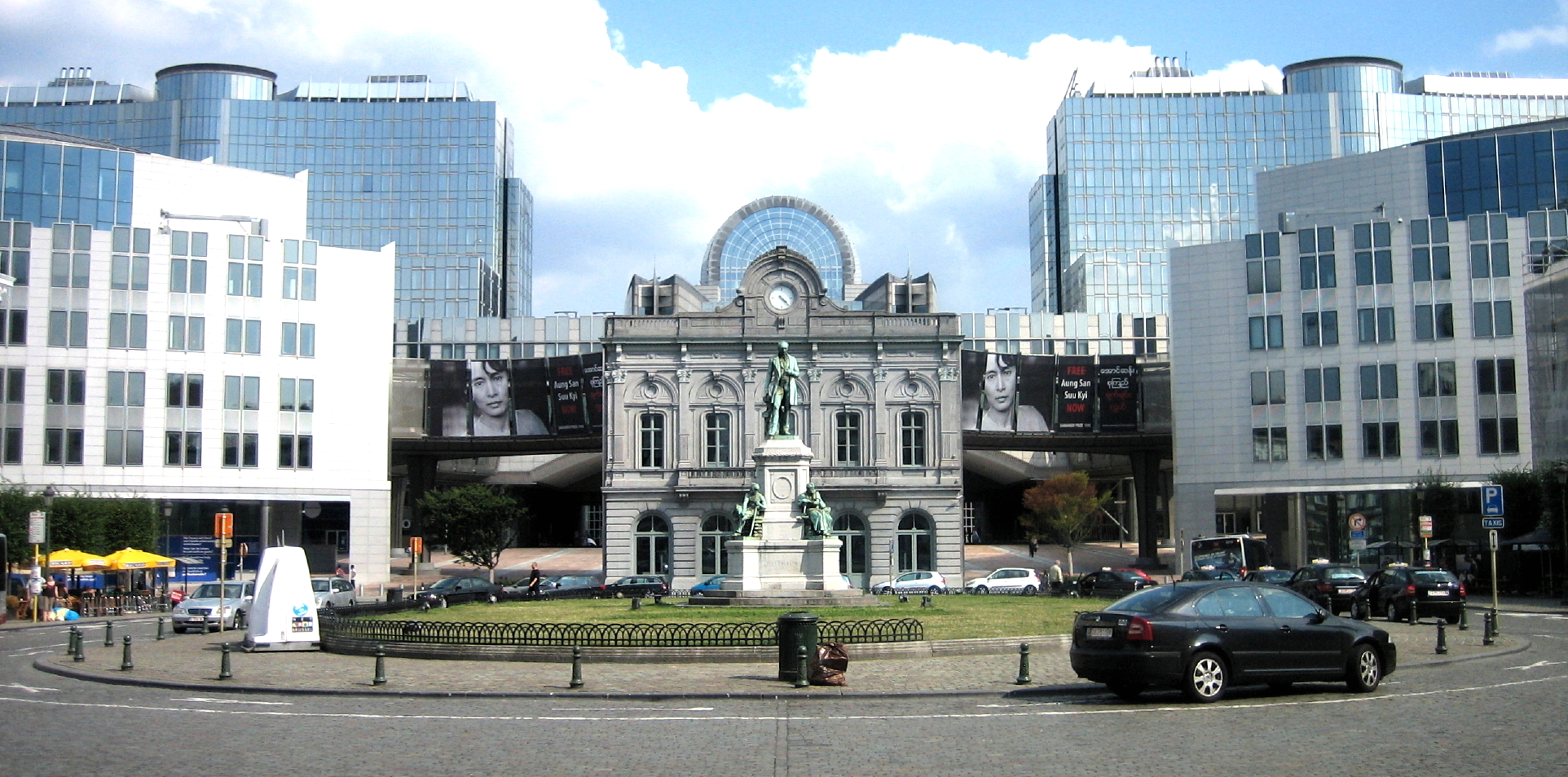
The Place du Luxembourg/Luxemburgplein in the European Quarter of Brussels. View facing east towards the European Parliament, including the old Brussels-Luxembourg railway station's entrance and the Monument to John Cockerill in front.

Historical and residential buildings, although still present, have been largely replaced by modern offices. These buildings were built not according to a high quality master plan or government initiative, but according to speculative private sector construction of office space, without which most buildings of the institutions would not have been built. However, due to Brussels's attempts to consolidate its position, there was large government investment in infrastructure in the quarter. Authorities are keen to stress that the previous chaotic development has ended, being replaced by planned architectural competitions and a master plan (see "future" below). The architect Benoit Moritz has argued that the area has been an elite enclave surrounded by poorer districts since the mid-19th century, and that the contrast today is comparable to an Indian city. However, he also said that the city has made progress over the last decade in mixing land uses, bringing in more businesses and residences, and that the institutions are more open to "interacting" with the city.

The quarter's land-use is very homogenous and criticised by some, for example the former Commission President, Romano Prodi, for being an administrative ghetto isolated from the rest of the city (though this view is not shared by all). There is also a perceived lack of symbolism, with some such as the architect Rem Koolhaas proposing that Brussels needs an architectural symbol to represent Europe (akin to the Eiffel Tower or Colosseum). Others do not think this is in keeping with the idea of the EU, with the novelist Umberto Eco viewing Brussels as a "soft capital"; rather than it being an "imperial city" of an empire, it should reflect the EU's position as the "server" of Europe. Despite this, the plans for redevelopment intend to deal with a certain extent of visual identity in the quarter.

=== Commission buildings ===
The most iconic structure is the Berlaymont building, the primary seat of the Commission. It was the first building to be constructed for the Community, originally built in the 1960s. It was designed by Lucien De Vestel, Jean Gilson, André Polak and Jean Polak and paid for by the Belgian government (who could occupy it if the Commission left Brussels). It was inspired by the UNESCO headquarters building in Paris, designed as a four-pointed star on supporting columns, and at the time an ambitious design.

Originally built with flock asbestos, the building was renovated in the 1990s to remove it and renovate the ageing building to cope with enlargement. After a period of exile in the Breydel building on the Avenue d'Auderghem, the Commission reoccupied the Berlaymont from 2005 and bought the building for €550 million.

The president of the Commission occupies the largest office, near the Commission's meeting room on the top (13th) floor. Although the main Commission building, it houses only 2,000 out of the 20,000 Commission officials based in Brussels. In addition to the Commissioners and their cabinets, the Berlaymont also houses the Commission's Secretariat-General and Legal Service. Across the quarter the Commission occupies 865,000 m^{2} (9,310,783 sq ft) in 61 buildings with the Berlaymont and Charlemagne buildings the only ones over 50,000 m^{2} (538,196 sq ft).

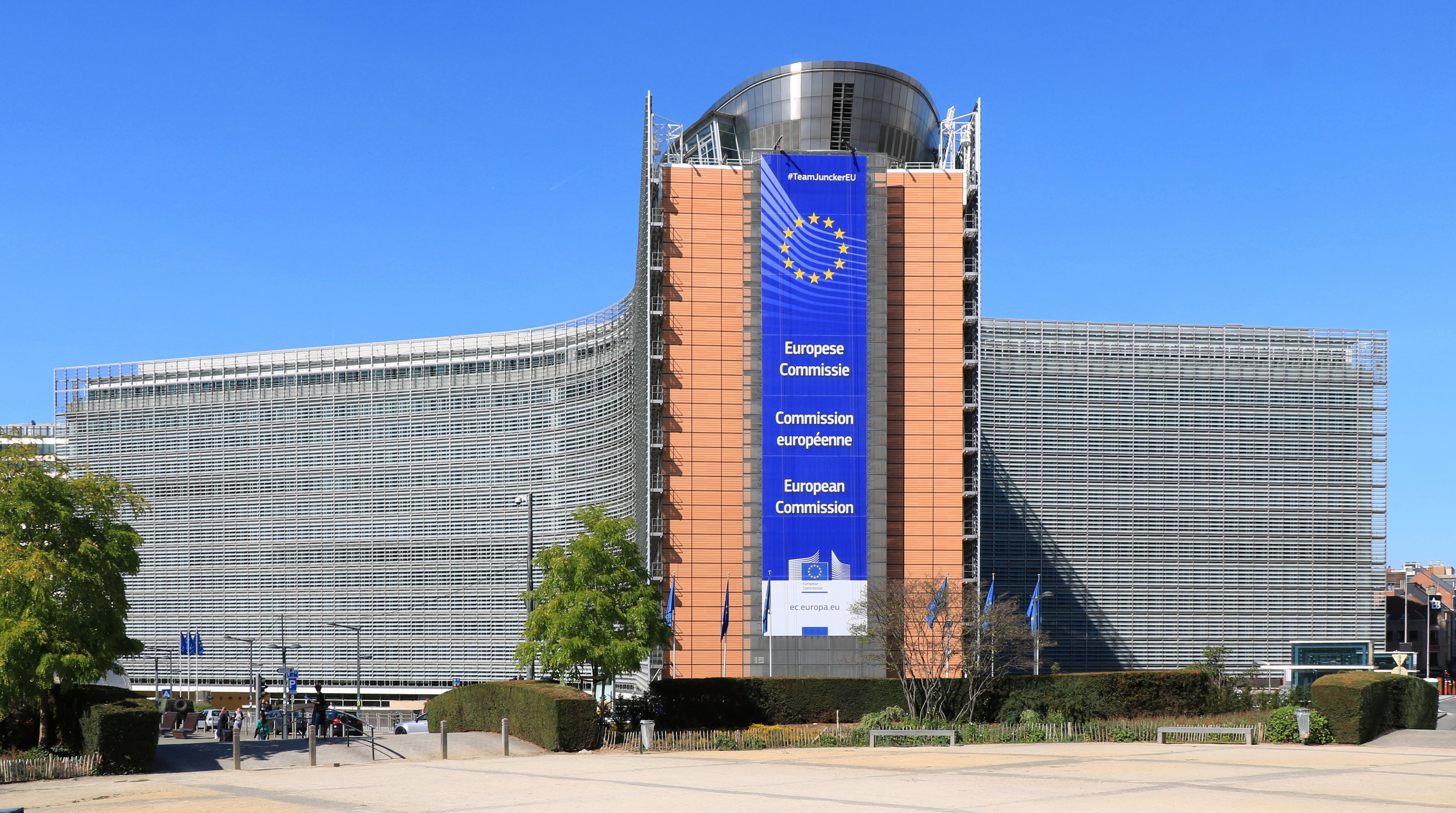
The Berlaymont building, primary headquarters of the European Commission

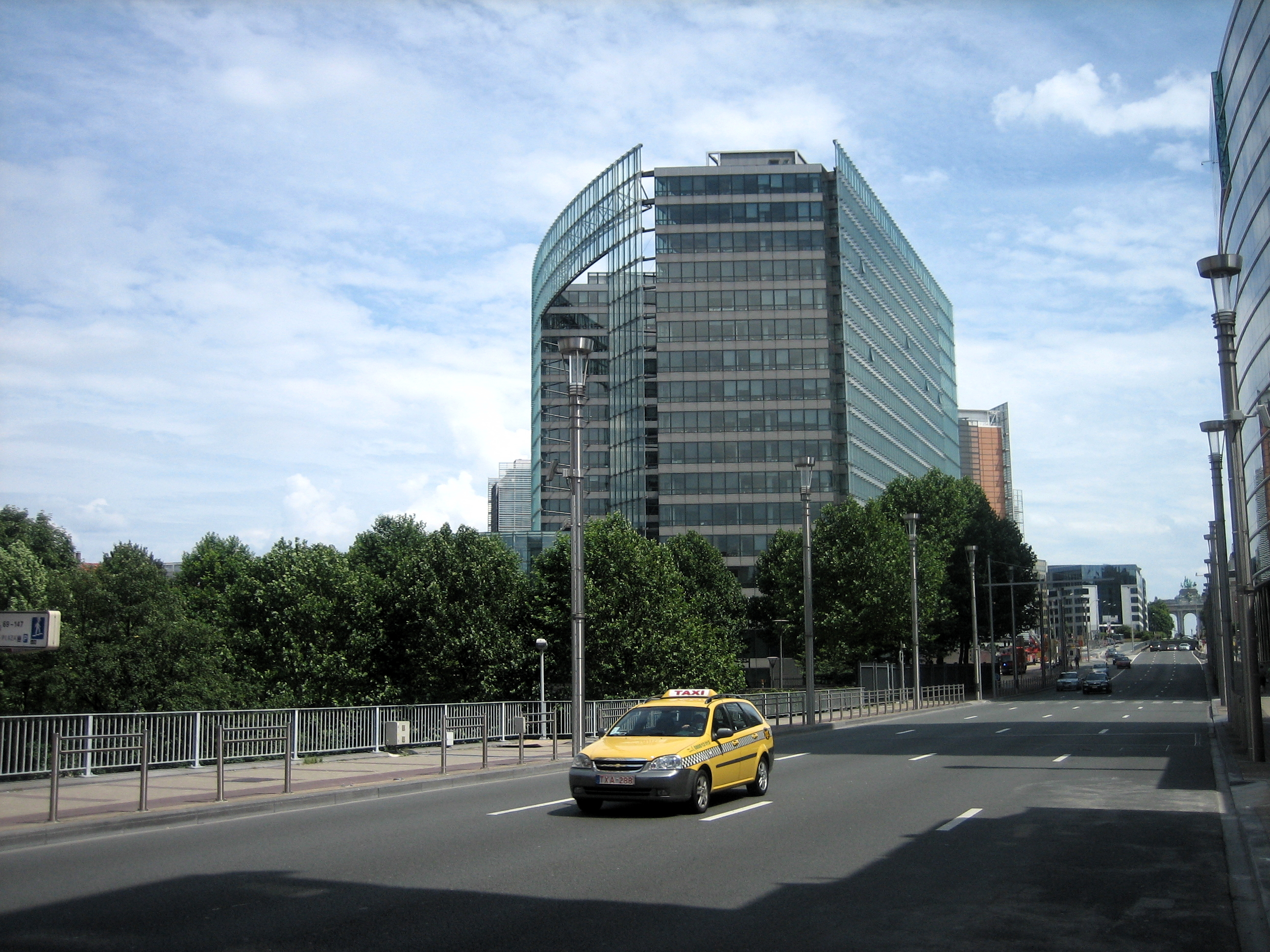
The Charlemagne building, the Commission's second largest building, housing DG TRADE, DG ECFIN and the Internal Audit Service

=== Councils buildings ===
Across the Rue de la Loi from the Berlaymont is the Europa building, which the Council of the European Union and the European Council have used as their headquarters since the beginning of 2017. Their former home in the adjacent Justus Lipsius building is still used for low-level meetings and to house the Council's Secretariat, which has been located in Brussels' city centre and the Charlemagne building during the course of its history. The renovation and construction of the new Council building was intended to change the image of the European Quarter, and was designed by the architect Philippe Samyn to be a "feminine" and "jazzy" building to contrast with the hard, more "masculine" architecture of other EU buildings. The building features a "lantern shaped" structure surrounded by a glass atrium made up of recycled windows from across Europe, intended to appear "united from afar but showing their diversity up close."

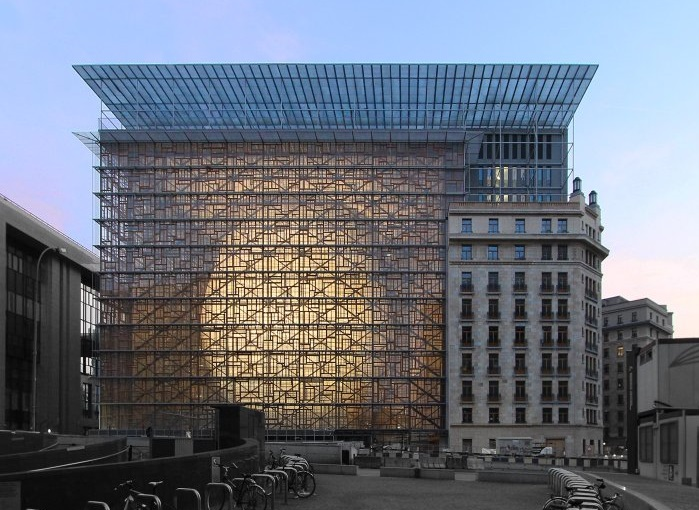
The Europa building, seat of the European Council and the Council of the European Union

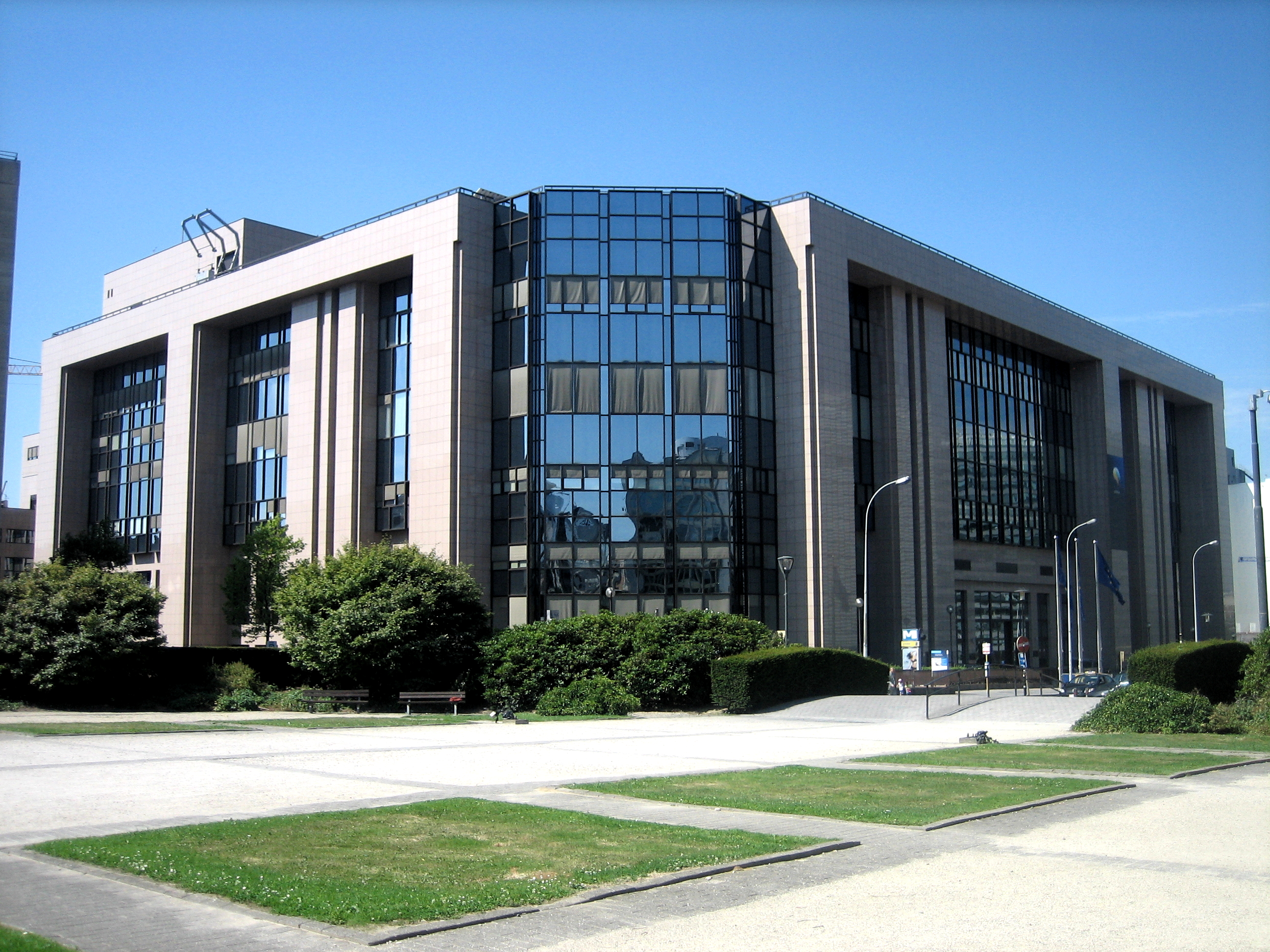
The Justus Lipsius building is still used for low-level meetings and to house the Council's Secretariat.

=== Parliament buildings ===
The European Parliament's buildings are located to the south between Leopold Park and the Place du Luxembourg, over Brussels-Luxembourg railway station, which is underground. The complex, known as the "Espace Léopold" (or "Leopoldsruimte" in Dutch), has two main buildings: the Paul-Henri Spaak building and the Altiero Spinelli building, which cover 372,000 m^{2} (4,004,175 sq ft). The complex is not the official seat of the Parliament with its work being split with Strasbourg (its official seat) and Luxembourg (its secretariat). However, the decision-making bodies of the Parliament, along with its committees and some of its plenary sessions, are held in Brussels to the extent that three-quarters of its activity take place in the city. The Parliament buildings were extended with the new D4 and D5 buildings being completed and occupied in 2007 and 2008. It is believed the complex now provides enough space for the Parliament.

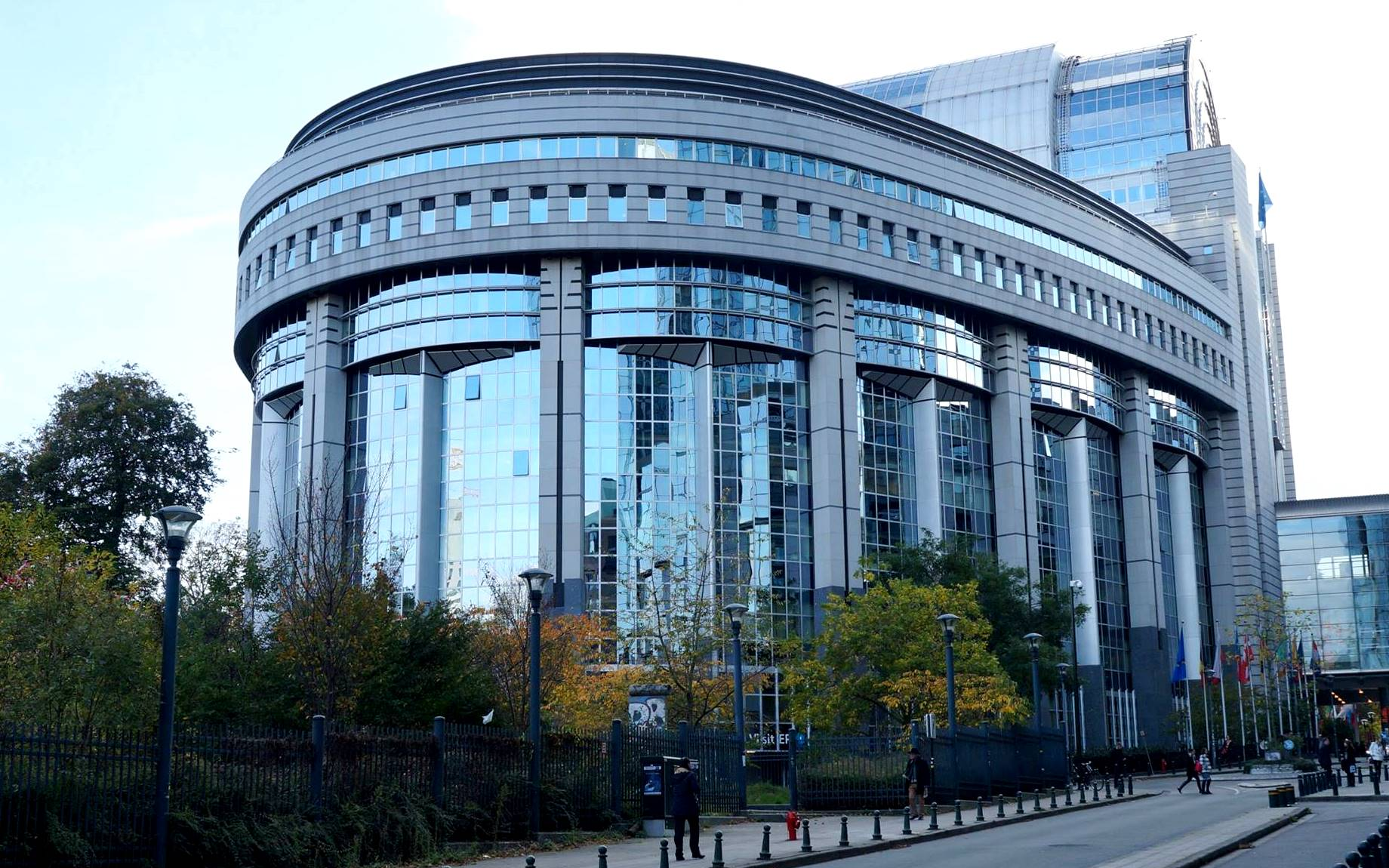
The Espace Léopold buildings, housing the European Parliament

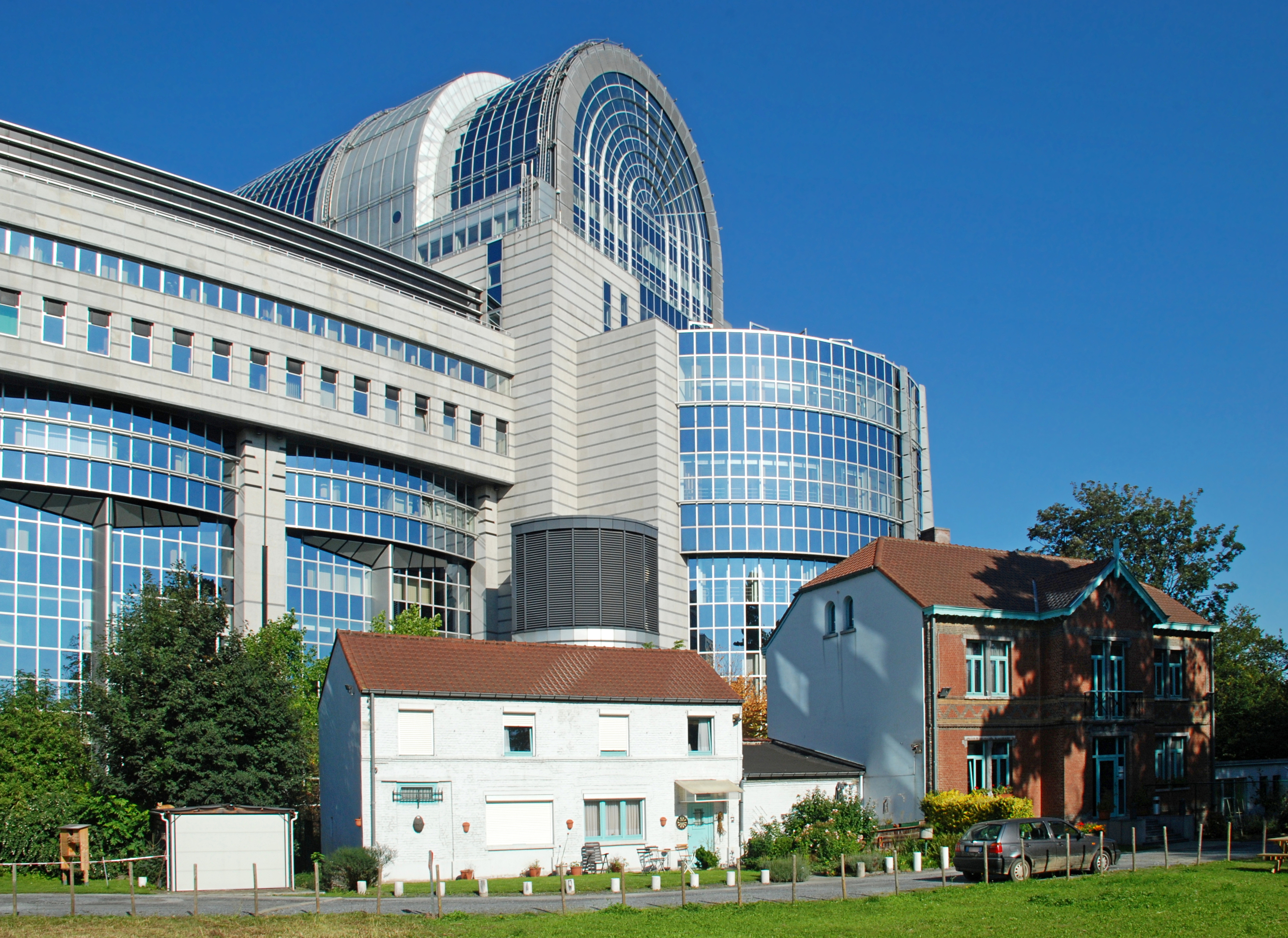
The Paul-Henri Spaak building

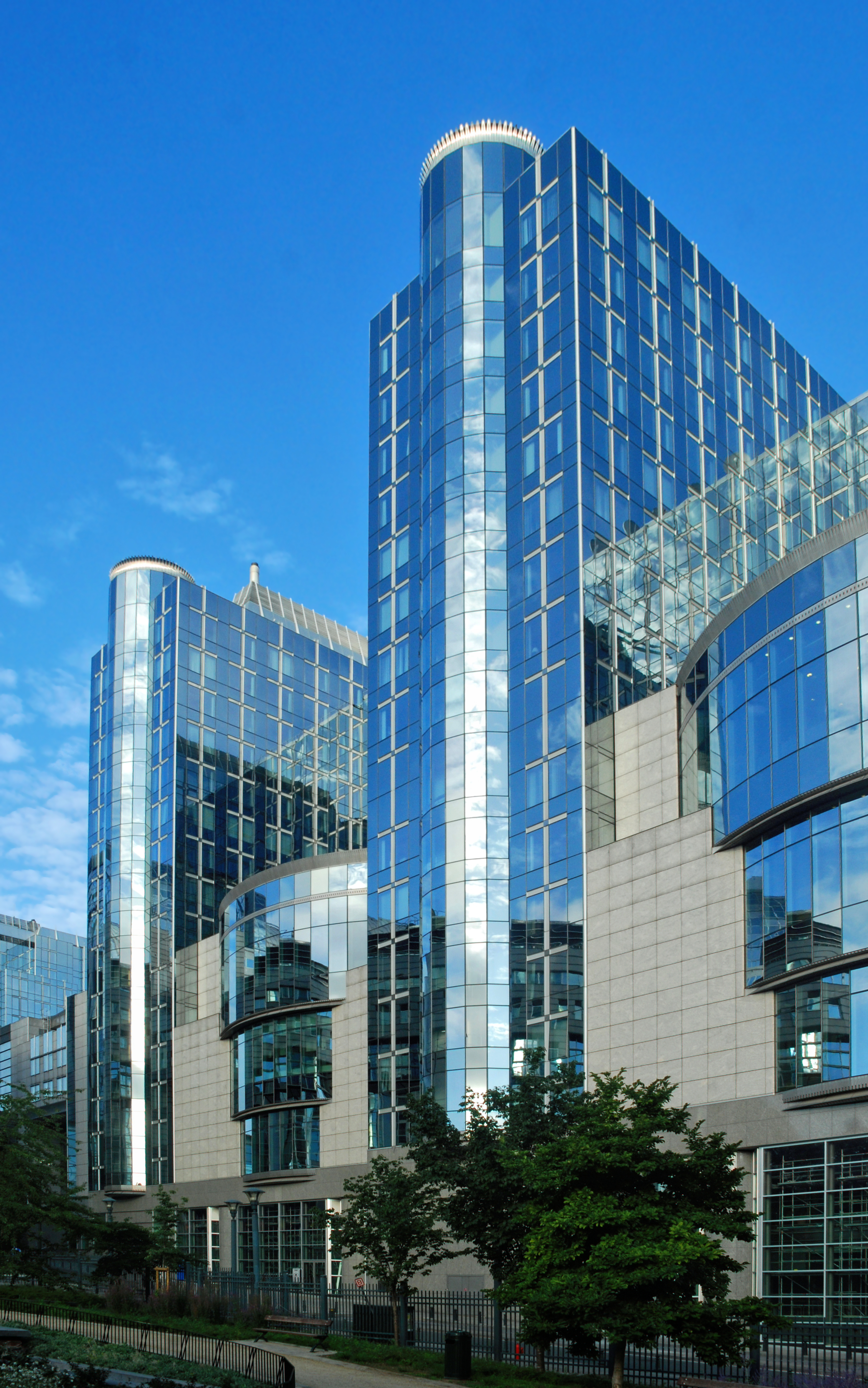
The Altiero Spinelli building

=== Other institutions ===
The European External Action Service (EEAS) has been based in the Triangle building since 1 December 2010. The EEAS's bodies related to the Common Security and Defence Policy (CSDP) are situated in the Kortenberg building. The Economic and Social Committee and the Committee of the Regions together occupy the Delors building, which is next to Leopold Park and used to be occupied by the Parliament. They also use the office building Bertha von Suttner. Both buildings were named in 2006.

Brussels also hosts two additional EU agencies: the European Defence Agency (located on the Rue des Drapiers/Lakenweversstraat) and the Executive Agency for Competitiveness and Innovation (in Madou Plaza Tower in Saint-Josse-ten-Noode). There is also EUROCONTROL, a semi-EU air traffic control agency covering much of Europe and the Western European Union, which is a non-EU military organisation currently merging into the EU's CFSP, and is headquartered in Haren, on the north-eastern perimeter of the City of Brussels.

== Demography and economic impact ==
The EU's presence in Brussels has created significant social and economic impact. Jean-Luc Vanraes, member of the Brussels Parliament responsible for the city's external relations, goes as far to say the prosperity of Brussels "is a consequence of the European presence". As well as the institutions themselves, large companies are drawn to the city due to the EU's presence. In total, about 10% of the city has a connection to the international community.

In terms of demographics, 46% of the population of Brussels is from outside Belgium; of this, half is from other EU member states. About 3/5 of European civil servants live in the Brussels-Capital Region with 63% in the municipalities around the European district (24% in the Flemish Region and 11% in the Walloon Region). Half of civil servants are home owners. The "international community" in Brussels numbers at least 70,000 people. The institutions draw in, directly employed and employed by representatives, 50,000 people to work in the city. A further 20,000 people are working in Brussels due to the presence of the institutions (generating €2 billion a year) and 2000 foreign companies drawn into the city employ 80,000 multilingual locals.

In Brussels, there are 3,500,000 m^{2} (38,000,000 sq ft) of occupied office space; half of this is taken up by the EU institutions alone, accounting for a quarter of available office space in the city. The majority of EU office space is concentrated in the Leopold Quarter. Running costs of the EU institutions total €2 billion a year, half of which benefit Brussels directly, and a further €0.8 billion come from the expenses of diplomats, journalists, etc. Business tourism in the city generates 2.2 million annual hotel room nights. There are thirty international schools (15,000 pupils run by 2000 employees) costing €99 million a year.

However, there is considerable division between the two communities, with local Brussels residents feeling excluded from the European Quarter (a "white collar ghetto"). The communities often do not mix much, with expatriates having their own society. This is in part down to that many expatriates in Brussels stay for short periods only and do not always learn the local languages (supplanted by English/Globish), remaining in expatriate communities and sending their children to European Schools, rather than local Belgian ones.

== Future ==
=== Rebuilding ===
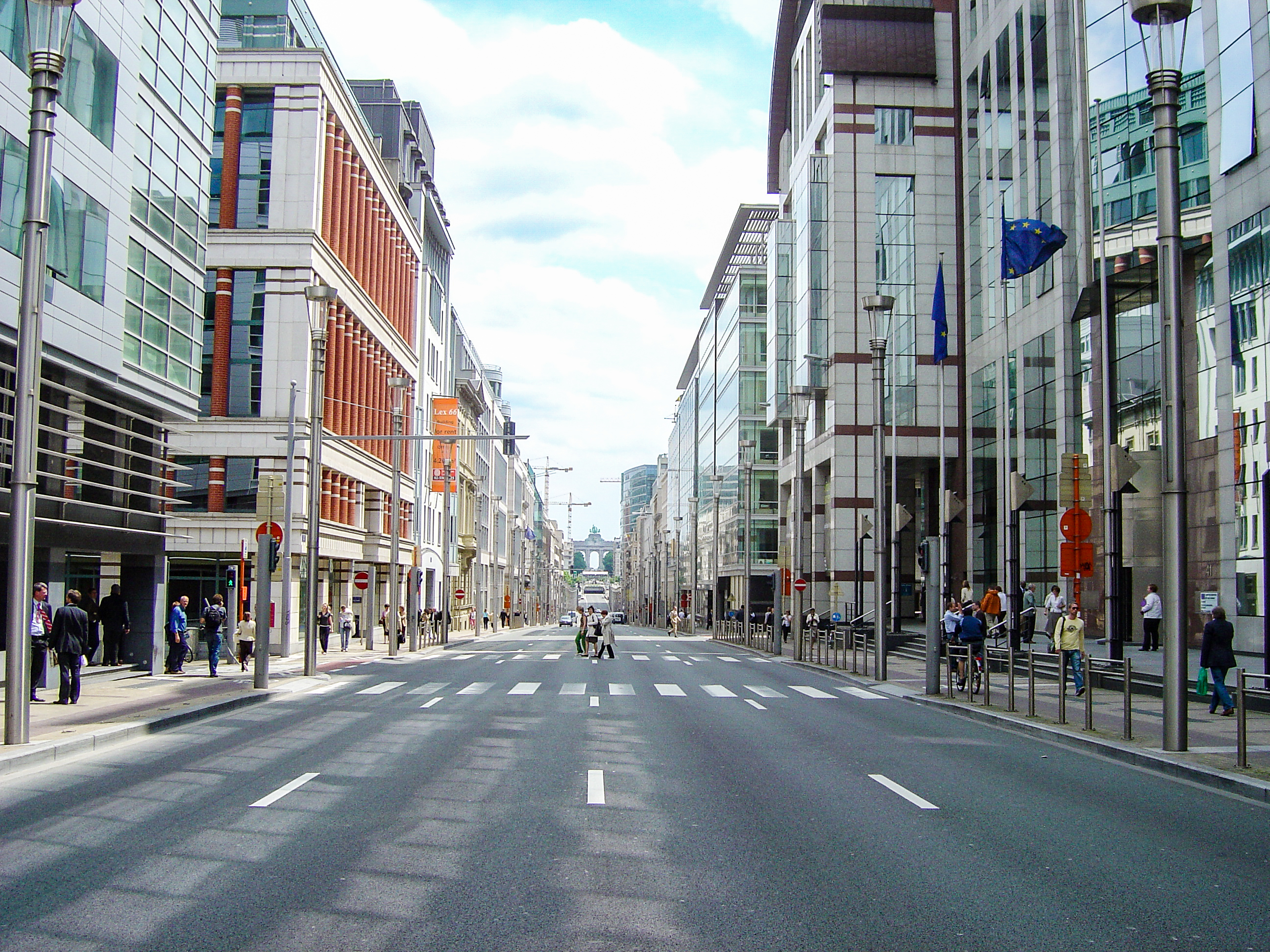
The Rue de la Loi/Wetstraat is set to be rebuilt with taller and more open buildings.

In September 2007, then-Commissioner for Administrative Affairs, Siim Kallas, together with then-Brussels Minister-President, Charles Picqué, unveiled plans for rebuilding the district. It would involve new buildings (220,000 m^{2} (2,368,060 sq ft) of new office space) but also more efficient use of existing space. This is primarily through replacing numerous smaller buildings with fewer, larger, buildings.

In March 2009, a French-Belgian-British team led by the French architect Christian de Portzamparc won a competition to redesign the Rue de la Loi between Maelbeek Valley Garden and the Résidence Palace in the east to the Small Ring in the west. Siim Kallas stated that the project, which would be put into action gradually rather than all at once, would create a "symbolic area for the EU institutions" giving "body and soul to the European political project" and providing the Commission with extra office space. The road would be reduced from four lanes to two, and be returned to two-way traffic (rather than all west-bound) and the architects proposed a tram line to run down the centre. A series of high-rise buildings would be built on either side with three 'flagship' skyscrapers at the east end on the north side. Charles Picqué described the towers as "iconic buildings that will be among the highest in Brussels" and that "building higher allows you to turn closed blocks into open spaces." The tallest towers at the eastern end would be subject to a separate architectural competition and would be symbolic of the Commission. The freed-up space (some 180,000 m^{2} (1,900,000 sq ft)) would be given over to housing, shops, services and open spaces to give the area a more "human" feel. A sixth European School may also be built. On the western edge of the quarter, on the Small Ring, there would be "gates to Europe" to add visual impact.

Given the delays and cost of the Berlaymont and other projects, the Commissioner emphasised that the new plans would offer "better value for money" and that the designs would be subject to an international architectural competition. He also pushed that controlling the buildings carbon footprint would be "an integral part of the programme".

==== Pedestrian squares ====
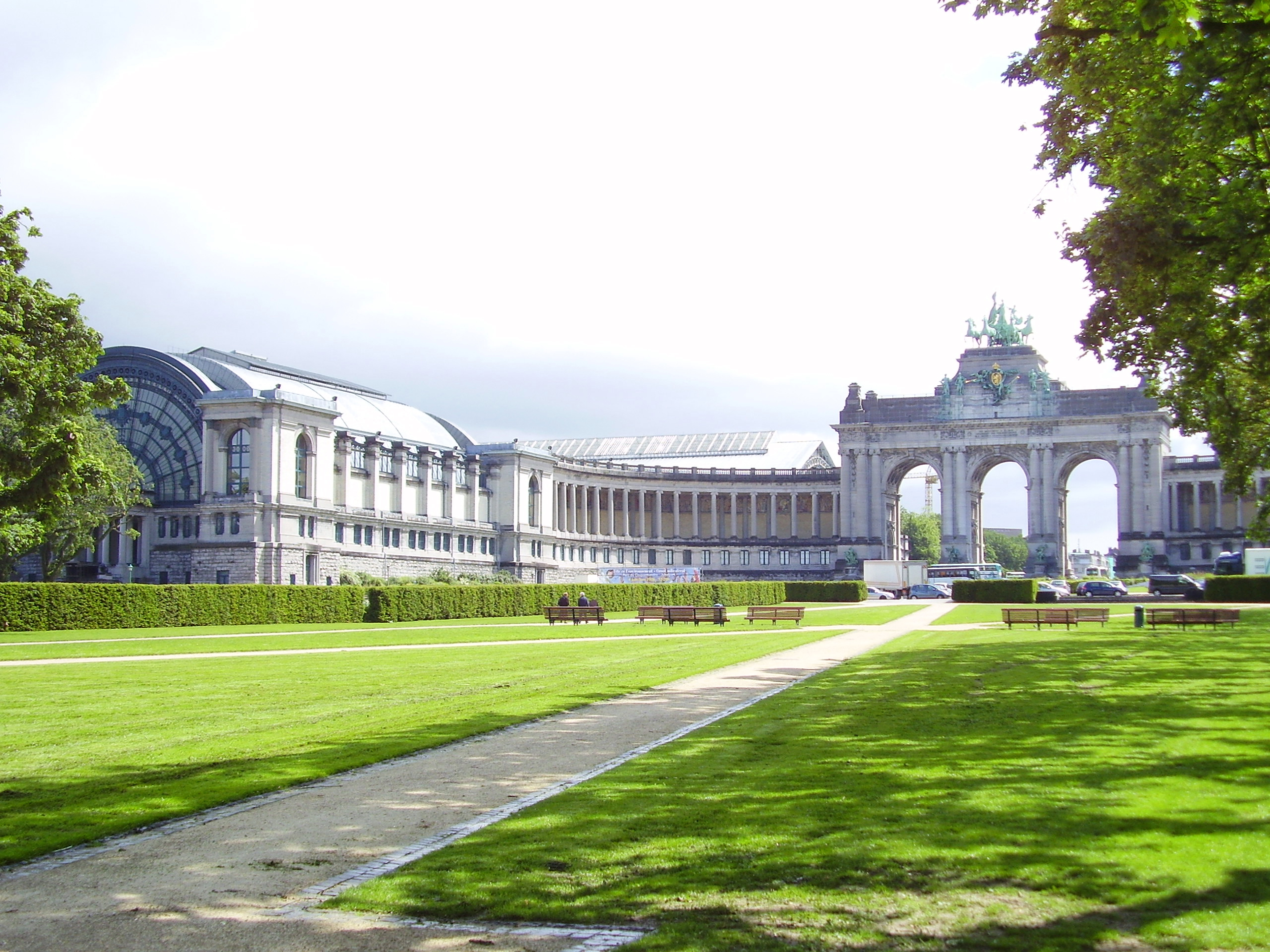
The Cinquantenaire/Jubelpark would be one of three European pedestrian squares.

There were plans to pedestrianise parts of the Rue de la Loi next to the Berlaymont. A new Place Schuman/Schumanplein (currently the Robert Schuman Roundabout) would be one of three new pedestrian squares. Schuman would focus on "policy and politics" and Schuman station itself would be redesigned. Coverings over nearby motorways and railways would be extended to shield them from view. However, the planned pedestrianisation of the Schuman Roundabout was cancelled in late 2014.

A pedestrian and visual link would be created between the Berlaymont and Leopold Park by demolishing sections of the ground to fourth floors of the Justus Lipsius, the south "bland" facade of which would be redesigned. Further pedestrian and cycle links would be created around the quarter. Pedestrian routes would also be created for demonstrations. Next to the Parliament at Leopold Park, the block of buildings between the Rue d'Arlon/Aarlenstraat and the Rue de Trêves/Trierstraat would be removed, creating a broad boulevard-like extension of the Place du Luxembourg, the second pedestrian square (focusing on citizens).

The third pedestrian square would be the Esplanade du Cinquantenaire/Esplanade van het Jubelpark (for events and festivities). Wider development may also surround Cinquantenaire Park with plans for a new metro station, underground car park and the "Europeanisation" of part of the Cinquantenaire complex with a "socio-cultural facility". It is possible that the Council may have to move to this area from the Europa building for security reasons.

=== Further quarters ===
The concentration of offices in the European Quarter has led to increase property prices due to the increased demand and reduced space. In response to this problem, the Commission has, since 2004, begun decentralising across the city to areas such as the Avenue de Beaulieu/Beaulieulaan in Auderghem and the Rue de Genève/Genevestraat in Evere. This has reduced price increases but it is still one of the most expensive areas in the city (€295/m^{2}, compared to €196/m^{2} on average). Neither the Parliament nor the Council have followed suit, however, and the policy of decentralisation is unpopular among the Commission's staff.

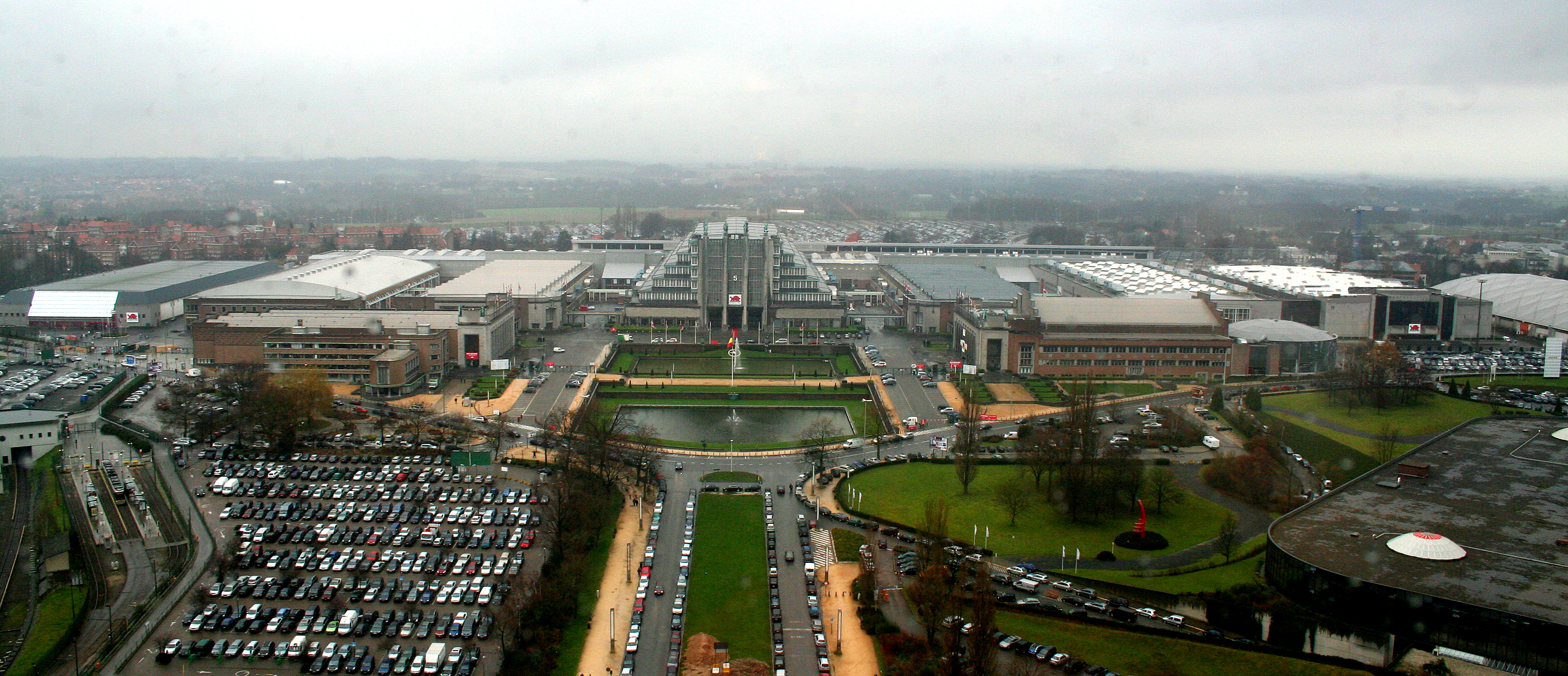
Centenary Palace on the Heysel/Heizel Plateau

Nevertheless, the Commission intends to develop two or three large "poles" outside the quarter, each greater than 100,000 m^{2} (1,076,391 sq ft). The Heysel/Heizel Plateau has been proposed as one of the new poles by the City of Brussels, which intends to develop the area as an international district regardless. The park, built around the Atomium landmark, already hosts a European School, has the largest parking facilities in Belgium, a metro station, an exhibition centre and the Mini-Europe miniature park. The city intends to build an international conference centre with 3,500 seats and an "important commercial centre." The Commission will respond to the proposal in the first half of 2009.

As for the existing Beaulieu pole, which is to the south east of the European Quarter, there is a proposal to link it with the main quarter by covering the railway lines between Beaulieu and the European Parliament (the esplanade of which sits on top of Brussels-Luxembourg railway station). Traffic on the lines is expected to increase creating environmental problems that would be solved by covering the lines. The surface would then be covered by flagstones, in the same manner as the Parliament's esplanade, to create a pedestrian/cyclist path between the two districts. The plan proposes that this "promenade of Europeans" of 3,720 metres (12,200 ft) be divided into areas dedicated to each of the member states.

=== Political status ===
Regions of Belgium: Flemish Region Brussels-Capital Region Walloon Region

Communities of Belgium: Flemish Community / Dutch language area Flemish & French Community / bilingual language area French Community / French language area German-speaking Community / German language area

Belgium operates a complex federal system and is divided into three regions, with the Brussels-Capital Region being an independent region, alongside Flanders and Wallonia. The regions are mostly responsible for the economy, mobility and other territory-related matters. Belgium is also divided into three communities: the Flemish Community, the French Community and the German-speaking Community. These communities are responsible for language-related matters such as culture or education.

Brussels does not belong to any community, but has a bilingual status, so Brussels' inhabitants may enjoy education, cultural affairs and education organised by the Flemish and/or the French community. This structure is the result of many compromises in the political spectrum going from separatism to unionism, while also combining the wishes of the Brussels population to have a degree of independence, as well as those of the Flemish and Walloon populations to having a level of influence over Brussels. The system has been criticised by some but it has also been compared to the EU, as a "laboratory of Europe".

In the hypothetical scenario of a separation of Belgium, the future status of Brussels is unknown. It might become an EU member state, or jointly run by the nations formed from Belgium and the EU itself. The possible status of Brussels as a "city state" has also been suggested by Charles Picqué, who sees a tax on the EU institutions as a way of enriching the city. However, the Belgian issue has very little discussion within the EU bodies.

The boundaries of the Brussels-Capital Region were determined from the 1947 language census' data. This was the last time that some municipalities were legally converted from monolingual Dutch-speaking into bilingual municipalities, joined with the Brussels agglomeration. The suggestive nature of the questions led to massive protests in Flanders (especially around Brussels), causing it to be unlikely to ever hold a language-related census again in Belgium. The result is that the Brussels Region is now a lot smaller than the French-speaking influence around the capital, and that there is very little space left in Brussels for important expansions of its infrastructure. Enlarging the territory of Brussels could potentially give it around 1.5 million inhabitants, an airport, a bigger forest, and bring the Brussels Ring onto its territory. A large and independent status may also help Brussels in its claim as the capital of the EU.

== See also ==
- European Institutions in Strasbourg
- History of the European Union
- Institutions of the European Union
- Location of European Union institutions
