= Charlemagne building =

High-rise in Brussels, Belgium

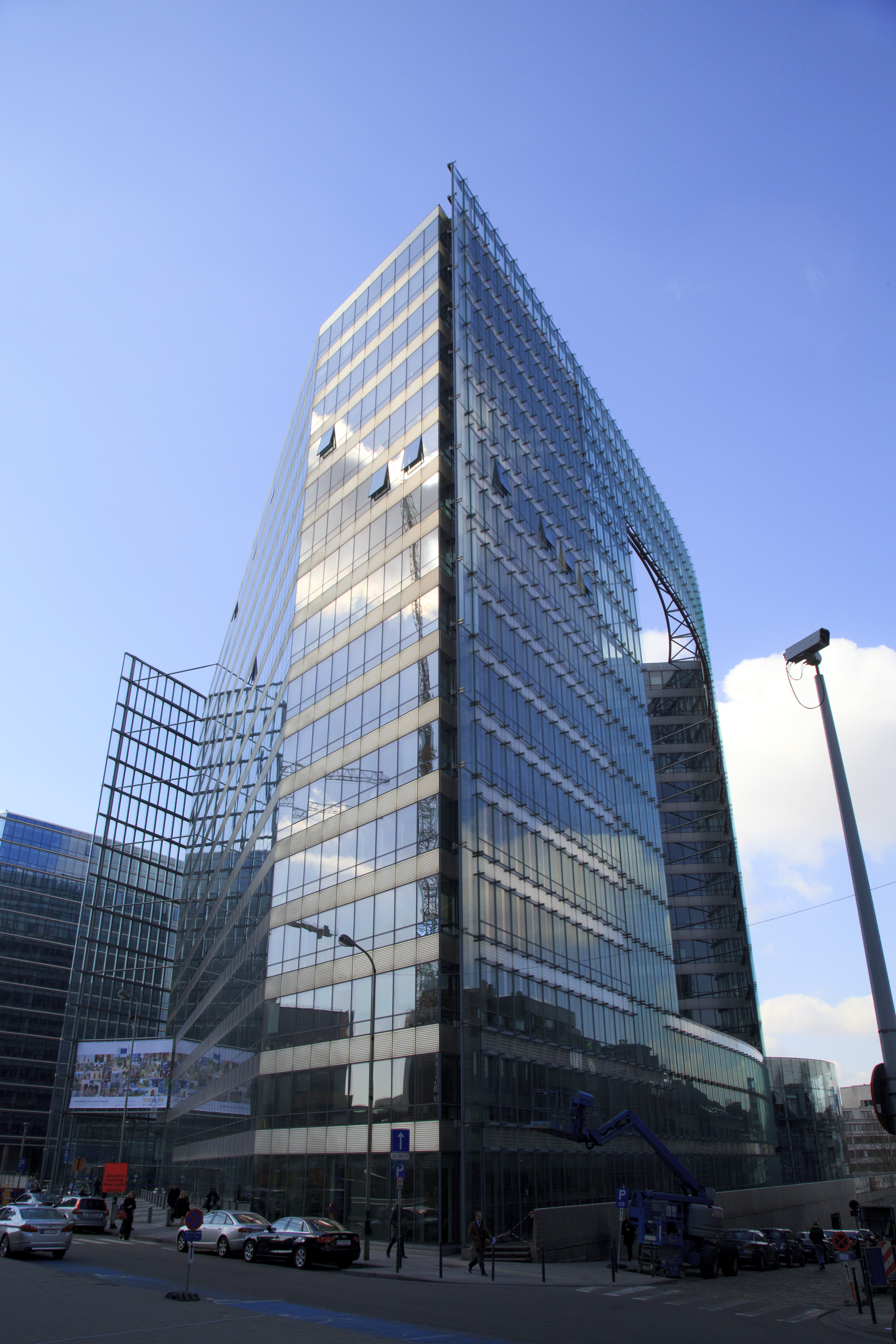
- The Charlemagne building in Brussels

General information
- Type: Office building
- Location: Rue de la Loi / Wetstraat 170, 1049 City of Brussels, Brussels-Capital Region, Belgium
- Coordinates: 50°50′37″N 4°22′49″E
- Construction started: 1967
- Owner: European Commission

Technical details
- Floor count: 15

Design and construction
- Architect: Jacques Cuisinier

Other information
- Number of rooms: 3 conference rooms

The Charlemagne building is a high-rise in the European Quarter of Brussels, Belgium, which houses the European Commission's Directorates-General for Economic and Financial Affairs, for Trade, and since 2015, the Internal Audit Service. It is named after Holy Roman Emperor Charlemagne.

The building has 3 wings and 15 floors. It is located at 170, rue de la Loi/Wetstraat, in the City of Brussels, one of the 19 municipalities forming the Brussels-Capital Region. The postal code for the municipality is 1000, but the postal code for the European Commission is 1049.

== History ==
The building was designed by Jacques Cuisinier and constructed in 1967 at the same time as the Berlaymont building to group together more scattered departments of the European Commission. However, with the Commission refusing to share the Berlaymont with the Council of the European Union, Charlemagne was given to the Council's Secretariat in 1971. This had previously been located in the city centre.

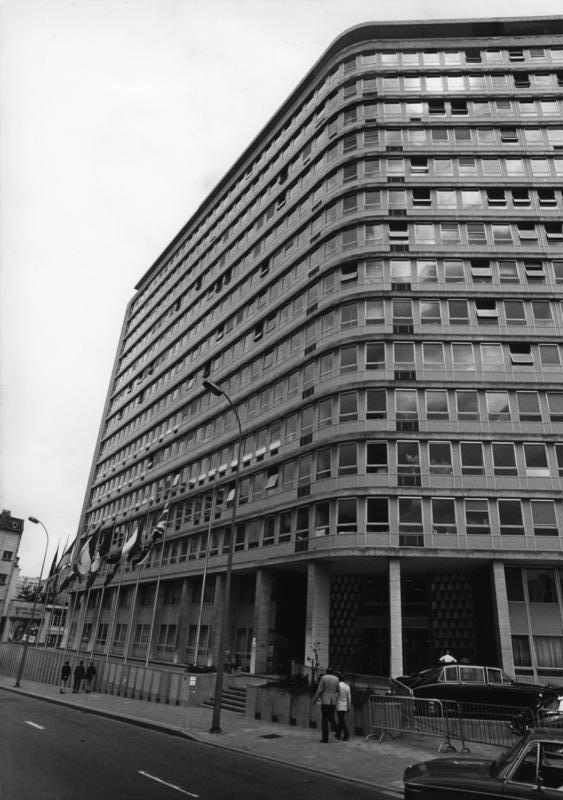
The Charlemagne building in 1975, before its modern renovation

The Council moved out to the Justus Lipsius building in 1995 allowing it to be renovated. The renovation was completed in 1998 by the German-American architect Helmut Jahn, replacing the largely concrete exterior with a glass one. After the restoration, it was occupied by the Commission, further grouping the Union's offices around the Robert Schuman Roundabout.

The building was briefly considered as the future headquarters of the European External Action Service, established in 2010, but was discounted on image grounds; as it houses RELEX, people would see the EEAS as a RELEX-plus rather than a unique body outside of the Commission.

== See also ==
- Breydel building
- Europa building
- Lex building
- Madou Plaza Tower
- Brussels and the European Union
- Institutional seats of the European Union
