= Madou Plaza Tower =

Skyscraper in Brussels, Belgium

- Tour Madou Plaza (French); Madou Plazatoren (Dutch)
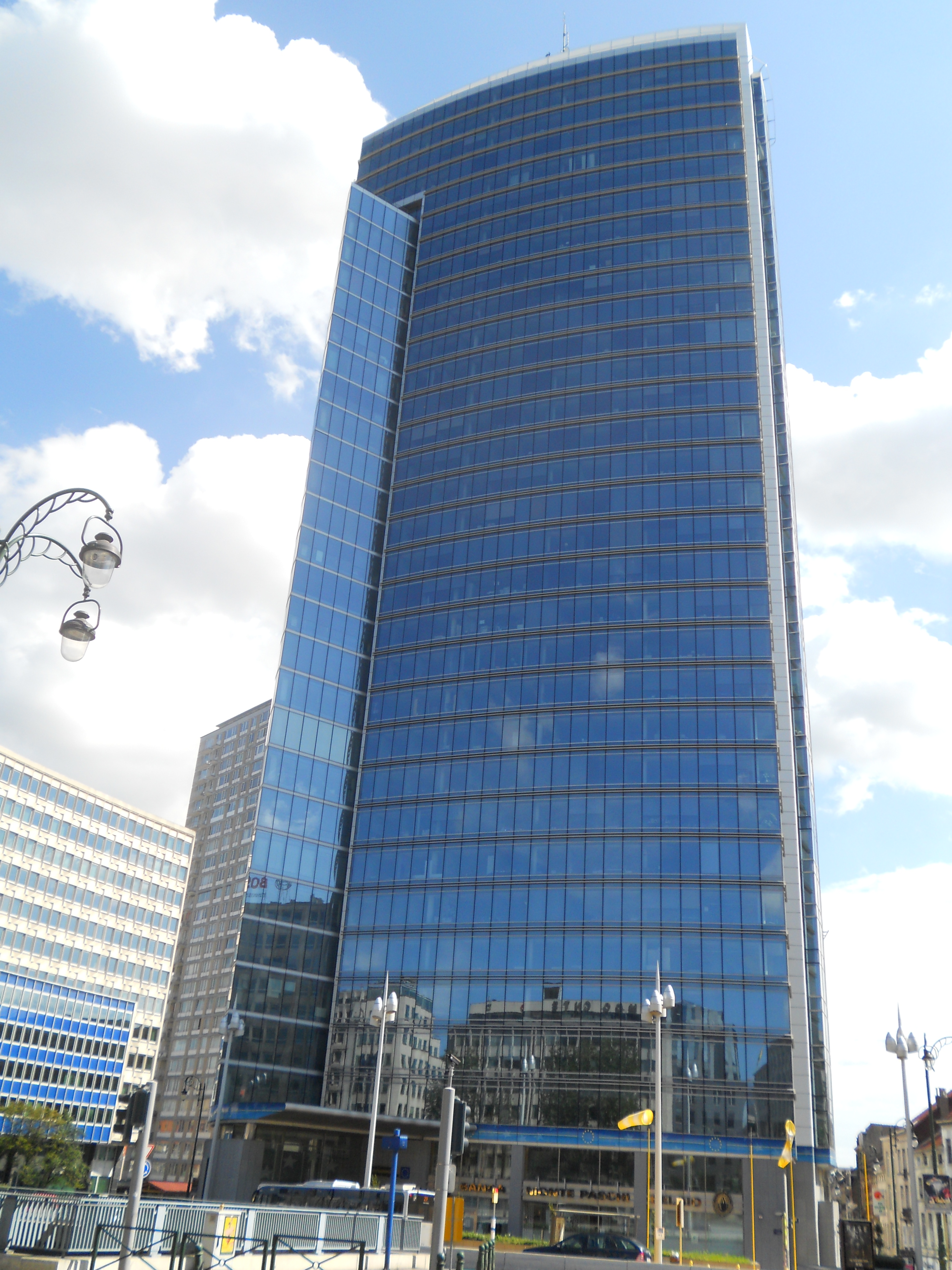
- The Madou Plaza Tower seen from the Boulevard Bischoffsheim/Bischoffsheimlaan
- Interactive map of the Madou Plaza Tower area

General information
- Status: Completed
- Type: Office building
- Location: Place Madou / Madouplein 1, 1210 Saint-Josse-ten-Noode, Brussels-Capital Region, Belgium
- Coordinates: 50°50′58″N 4°22′12″E
- Completed: 1965
- Owner: European Commission

Height
- Height: 120 m (390 ft) (building); 135 m (443 ft) (antenna)

Technical details
- Floor count: 33
- Floor area: 40,000 m^{2} (430,000 sq ft)

Design and construction
- Architect: Robert Goffaux
- Main contractor: Herpain Entreprise s.a.
- Awards and prizes: MIPIM 2006 (refurbished office buildings)

The Madou Plaza Tower (French: Tour Madou Plaza; Dutch: Madou Plazatoren) is a skyscraper in Brussels, Belgium. It was built in 1965, renovated between 2002 and 2006, and taken over by the European Commission. It is located on the Small Ring (Brussels' inner ring road) in the municipality of Saint-Josse-ten-Noode, at 1, place Madou/Madouplein. It hosts the Commission's Directorate-General for Competition.

== Description ==
The 33-storey core of the Madou Plaza Tower was built in just over a month and has been compared as a smaller version of the MetLife Building in New York City. There is a high voltage transformer in the basement for power, along with a 1360 kW emergency generator added during renovation. Two lifts connect to the parking garage.

During the 2002–2006 renovation, the building's height was increased from 112 metres (367 ft) to 120 metres (390 ft) and office space was increased by 10,000 m^{2} (110,000 sq ft) to 40,000 m^{2} (430,000 sq ft), requiring the building to be reshaped and strengthened. The renovation won the MIPIM Award 2006 in the 'Refurbished Office Buildings' category.

== European Commission ==
The European Commission bought the building on 13 March 2006, inaugurating it on 19 April when its 1,500 employees moved in. Based in Madou, as of 2007, were the Directorates-General for Communication, Informatics, and Education and Culture and the Executive Agency for Competitiveness and Innovation. Staff were previously based on the Axa building on the Robert Schuman Roundabout, which was to be demolished. Since late 2012, it has hosted the Directorate-General for Competition.

== See also ==
- Berlaymont building
- Breydel building
- Charlemagne building
- Europa building
- Lex building
- Brussels and the European Union
- Institutional seats of the European Union

Records
Preceded by Boerentoren	Tallest building in Belgium; 1965–1967; 120 metres (390 ft)	Incumbent
