= Breydel building =

Building in Brussels, Belgium

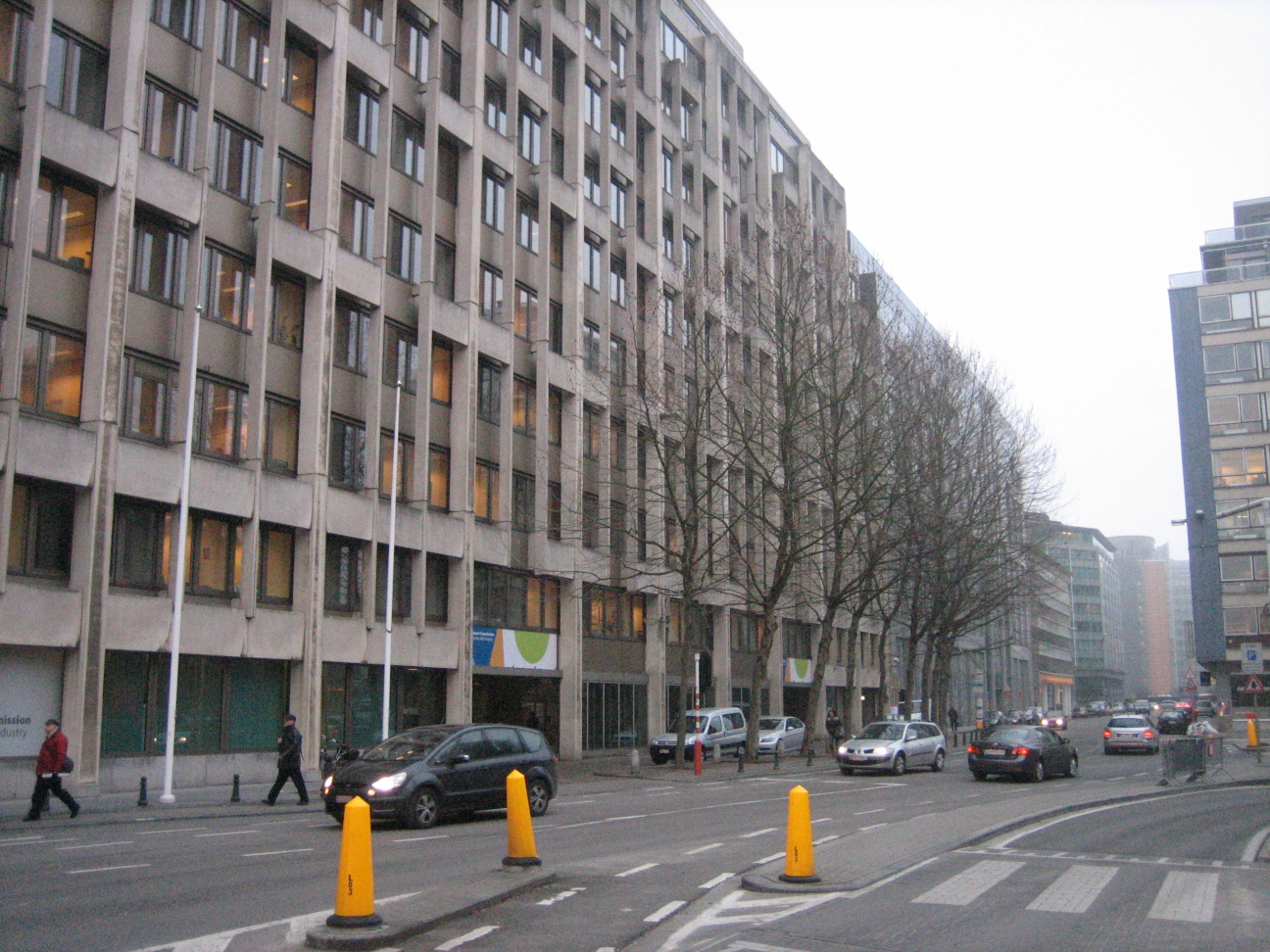
- The Breydel building in Brussels
- Interactive map of the Breydel building area

General information
- Type: Office building
- Location: Brussels, Belgium
- Coordinates: 50°50′24″N 4°23′6″E
- Owner: European Commission

The Breydel building is an office block in the European Quarter of Brussels, Belgium, which served as a temporary headquarters for the European Commission between 1991 and 2004. It is named after Jan Breydel, a legendary Flemish leader known from the Battle of the Golden Spurs.

== History ==
The seat of the European Commission, the symbolic Berlaymont building, was in dire need of renovation due to the discovery of asbestos in its construction. A new building was rapidly needed to house the President and his college of Commissioners, as the issue of the location of European Union institutions was being discussed and any delays could lead to the Commission withdrawing from the city.

Plans for the building were already being prepared by the bank BACOB due to the rapidly expanding needs of the Commission, though the entire block would be needed to house the 1,300 civil servants and auxiliary services. Foreseeing this, developers had bought a block of houses each on the area to ensure they all received a slice of the pie when the land was bought up.

The building was designed by André and Jean Polak, who had also designed the Berlaymont, together with Marc Vanden Bossche and Johan Van Dessel. It took just 23 months to build. The main building was ready just in time for the transfer of Commission staff at the end of 1991, and expansion continued through the 1990s.

The President and most of the Commission moved back to the Berlaymont when renovation was completed in 2004. However, the Commission had bought the building when it had moved in (one of the first times it had bought a building rather than renting it) and it is still a Commission building today, housing the Directorate-General for Internal Market, Industry, Entrepreneurship and SMEs and the Directorate-General for Budget.

== See also ==
- Charlemagne building
- Convent Van Maerlant
- Madou Plaza Tower
- Brussels and the European Union
- Institutional seats of the European Union
