= Robert Schuman Roundabout =

Roundabout in Brussels, Belgium

Rond-point Schuman (French); Schumanplein (Dutch)
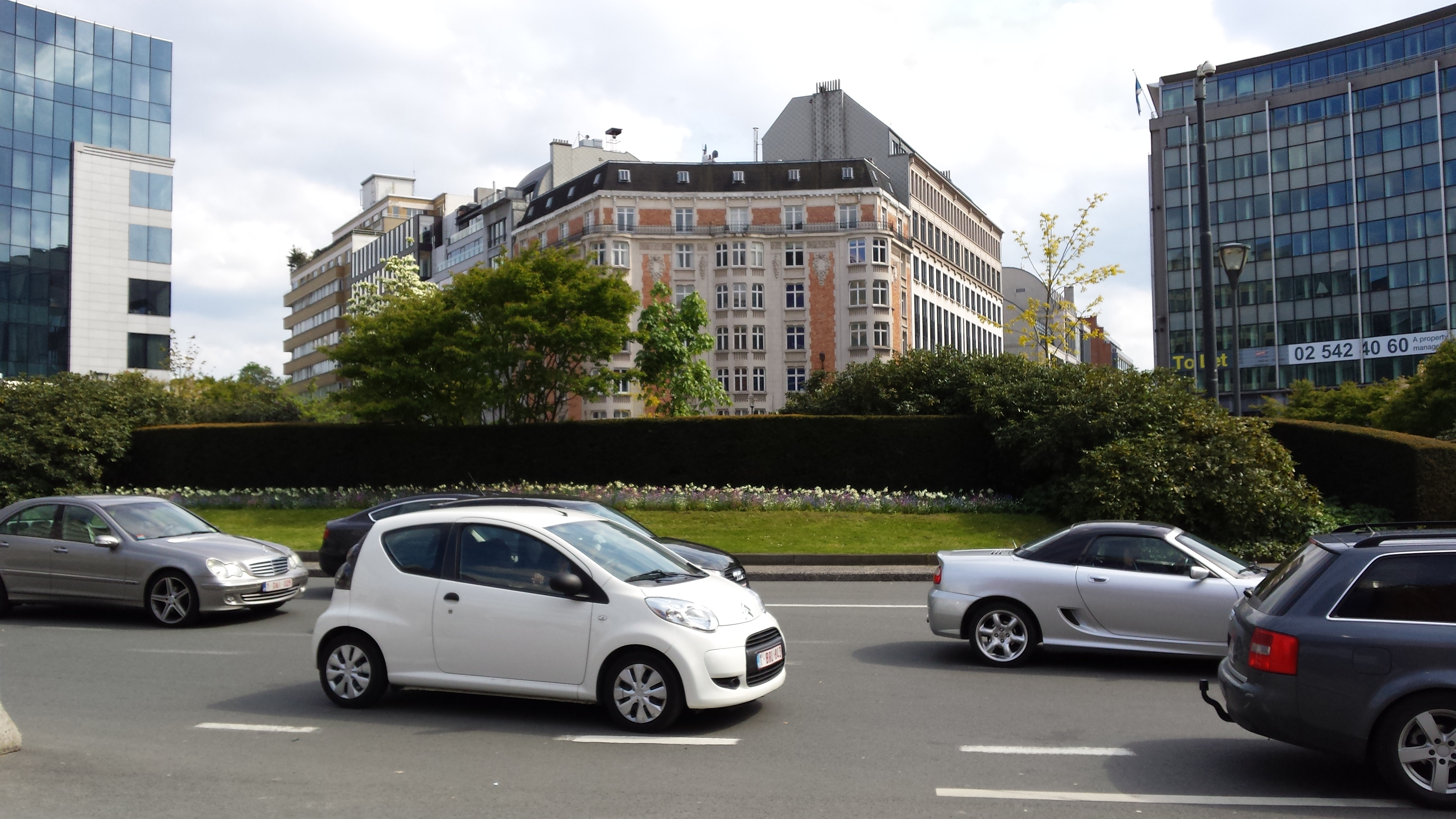
- The Robert Schuman Roundabout in Brussels

- Location within Brussels Location within Belgium
- Namesake: Robert Schuman
- Type: Roundabout
- Location: City of Brussels, Brussels-Capital Region, Belgium
- Quarter: Leopold Quarter
- Postal code: 1040
- Nearest metro station: 1 5 Schuman
- Coordinates: 50°50′33″N 04°23′02″E

The Robert Schuman Roundabout (French: Rond-point Robert Schuman; Dutch: Robert Schumanplein), usually shortened to the Schuman Roundabout, and sometimes called Schuman Square, is a roundabout in the European Quarter of Brussels, Belgium. It lies at the end of the Rue de la Loi/Wetstraat and serves as a focus for major institutions of the European Union (EU). It is named after Robert Schuman, one of the founding fathers of the European Union, the Council of Europe and NATO, and gives its name to the surrounding district (also known as the European Quarter) and Brussels-Schuman railway station.

== Location and buildings ==
The Robert Schuman Roundabout is in the centre of Brussels' European Quarter. The major buildings next to it are the Berlaymont building (headquarters of the European Commission), the Justus Lipsius building (used to hold low-level meetings of the Council of the European Union and provide office space to the Council's Secretariat) and numerous other EU offices.

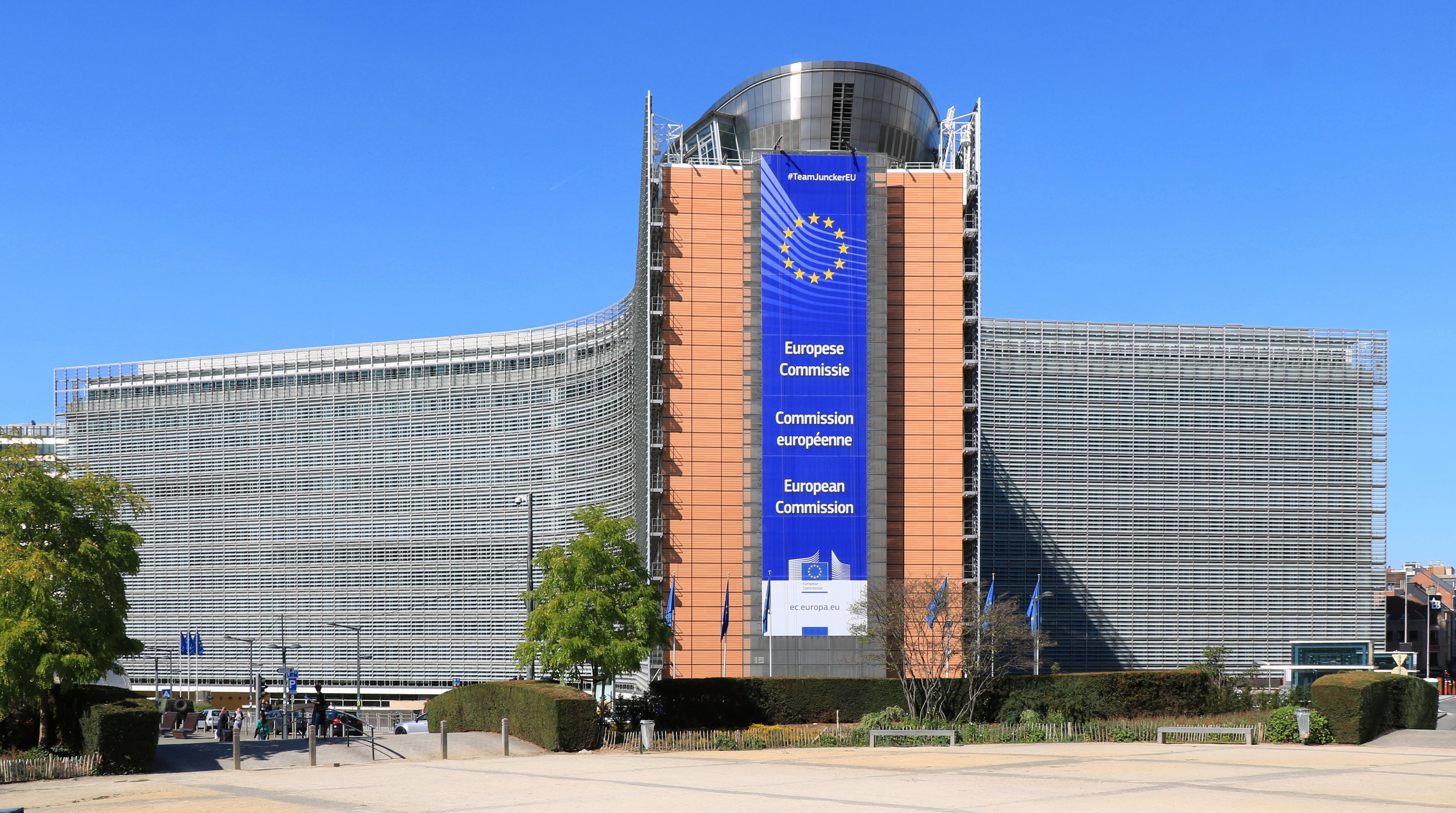
The Berlaymont building, primary headquarters of the European Commission

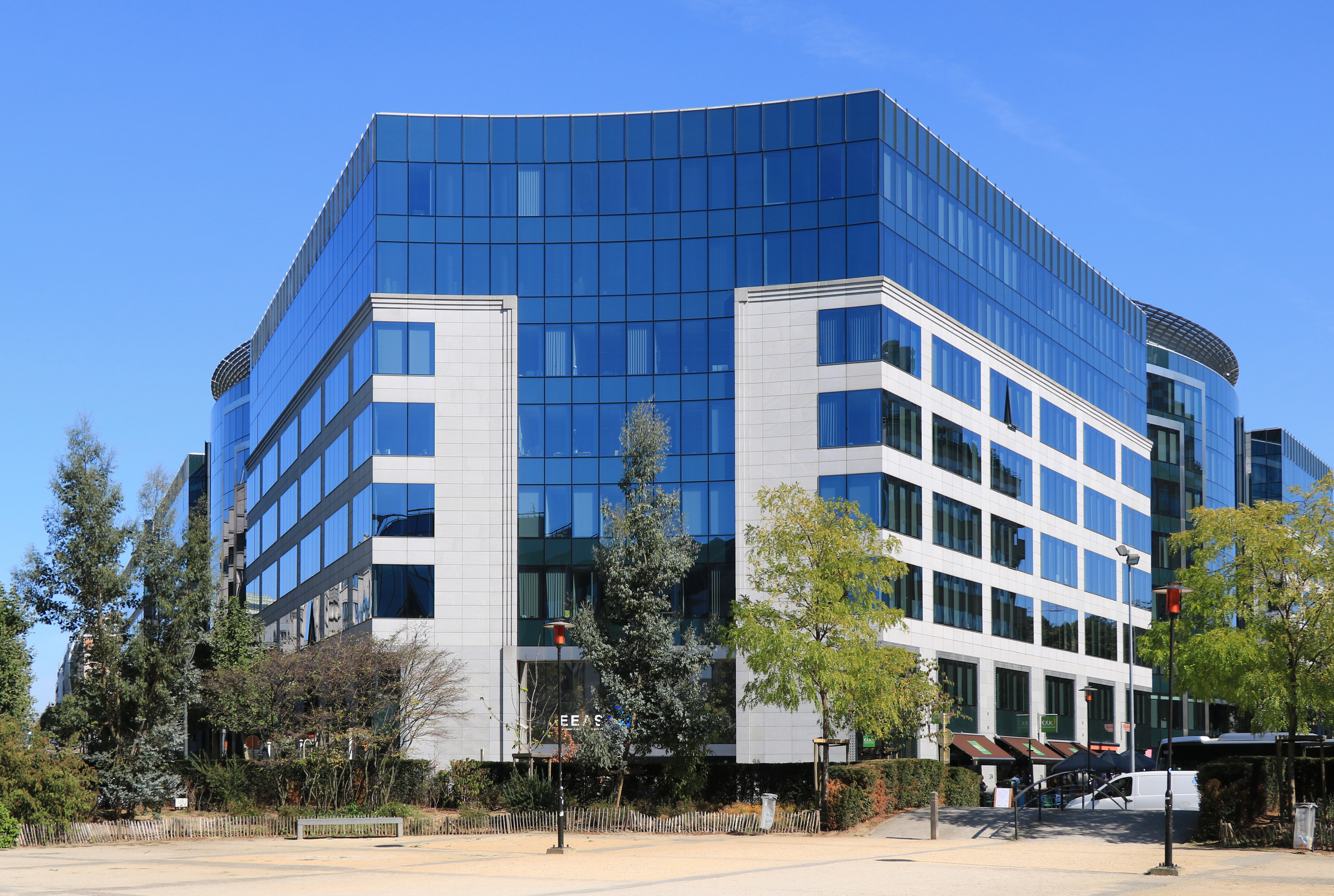
The Capital (Atelier d'architecture de Genval, 2001–2009)

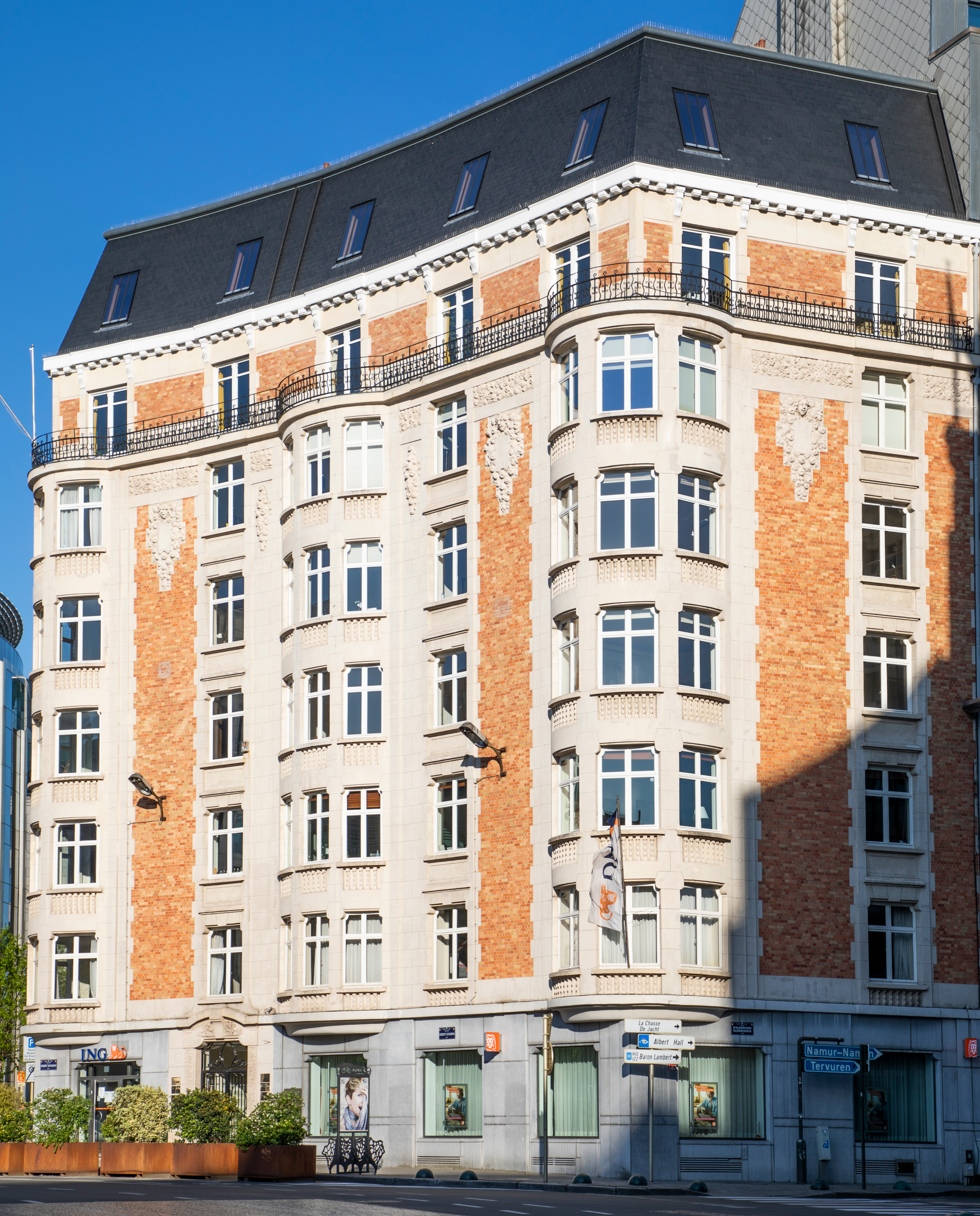
Building (Varlet, 1928)

== Accessibility and future ==
The Schuman Roundabout is above the eastern end of the metro segment of Schuman station. In 2016, the station was renovated to connect it by rail to Brussels Airport via the Schuman-Josaphat tunnel. There are already a web of rail and road tunnels running under and around the roundabout. The area is to see some major rebuilding as EU offices are converted into shops and other civilian uses and the roundabout will be converted into one of three pedestrian squares. The theme of the new Schuman Square will concentrate on "policy and politics" (see Brussels and the EU#Future for details).

Following the approval of the Brut and Cobe project in 2017, redevelopment of the Schuman Roundabout officially began in late 2023. The initial plan included a new pedestrian agora and the closure of the roundabout to cars from the south and north, allowing only pedestrians and micromobility users to access it from these two directions. The centrepiece was supposed to be a circular steel canopy with a green roof in the shape of the European Parliament's hemicycle. Due to a lack of budget, however, the project was finally delivered in 2026 with modifications to the initial plan: the large steel canopy was abandoned, leaving the square as a plain concrete expanse with minimal greenery after three years of work.

== Roads meeting at the roundabout ==
- The Rue de la Loi/Wetstraat runs west–north–west towards central Brussels, one-way. It also continues east–south–east for a short distance towards the western end of the Parc du Cinquantenaire/Jubelpark. The bulk of the traffic on this main carriageway avoids the roundabout by taking the tunnel underneath, the road becoming the Avenue de Tervueren/Tervurenlaan and heading out of Brussels east/east–south–east towards Woluwe-Saint-Pierre and eventually Tervuren.
- The Avenue de Cortenbergh/Kortenberglaan leads north–east towards Schaerbeek and the Place de Jamblinne de Meux/De Jamblinne de Meuxplein. The Rue Belliard/Belliardstraat tunnel also follows this route, leading out towards Diamant premetro station and the E40.
- The Rue Archimède/Archimedestraat leads north towards the Square Ambiorix/Ambiorixsquare.
- The Avenue d'Auderghem/Oudergemselaan runs south–east through the middle of Etterbeek, towards the La Chasse junction and Auderghem.
- The Rue Froissart/Froissartstraat is one of the smaller roads leaving the roundabout, heading towards the Place Jourdan/Jourdanplein.

== See also ==
- History of Brussels
- Belgium in the long nineteenth century
