= European Horizons =

American think tank

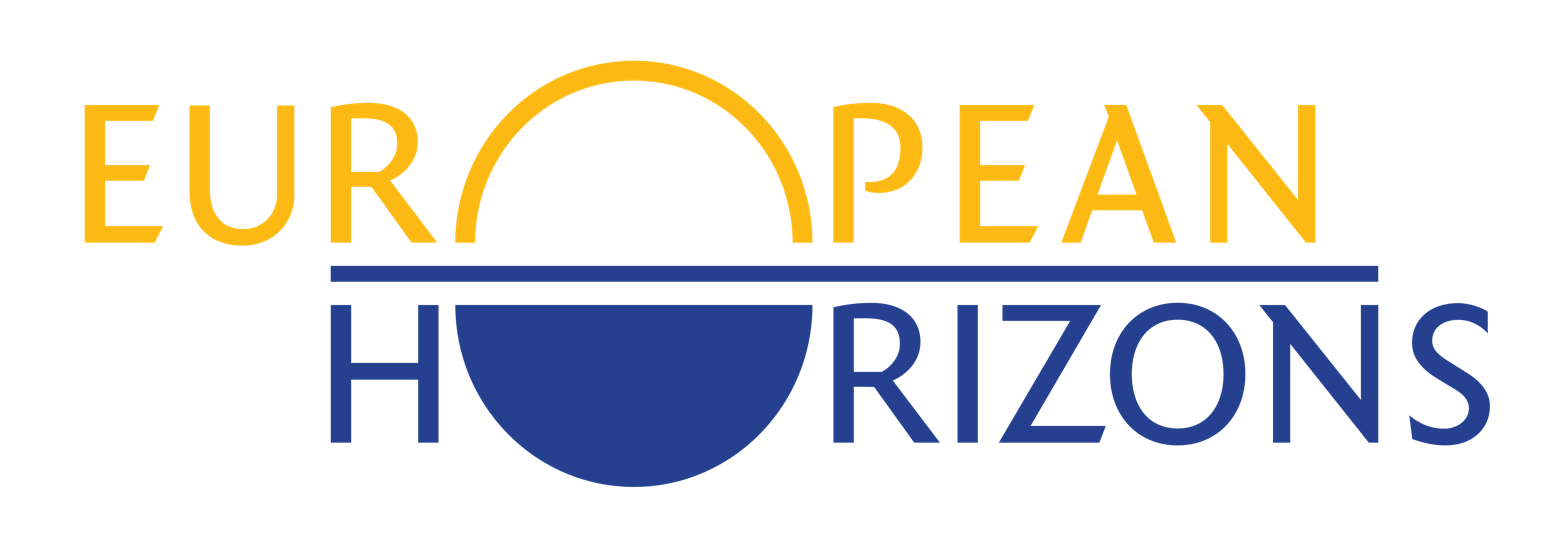
- Other name: EuH
- Parent institution: European Commission
- Established: February 2015
- Focus: Future of the European and Transatlantic Affairs
- Executive Director: Lorenzo Donatelli
- Members: 1300+
- Location: Global
- Website: europeanhorizons.org

European Horizons is a Atlanticist incubator with a mission to foster stronger transatlantic bonds and a more united Europe. The organization emphasizes democracy, equality, and freedom. European Horizons' advisory board has included notable figures such as Pascal Lamy, Klaus Welle, and Jean-Claude Trichet.

The organization connects students, young professionals, and experts from academia, government, and the private sector, facilitating intergenerational dialogue on the future of Europe and transatlantic relations.

The organization was founded at Yale University in 2015 and is supported by the European Commission through the Erasmus+ Programme.

== History ==
European Horizons (often abbreviated EuH) was founded in February 2015 at the inaugural European Student Conference (ESC) at Yale University, with the encouragement of policy-makers, such as Pascal Lamy, Tony Blair, David O'Sullivan, and Erhard Busek, and professors, such as David R. Cameron, Jolyon Howorth, and Vivien Schmidt. The participants' policy ideas were referenced in international media, such as on Euractiv in an op-ed with Wolfgang Petritsch and an interview with David O'Sullivan.

== Policy Work ==
European Horizons' policy work is guided by a set of priorities that reflect contemporary challenges in transatlantic affairs. These priorities play a major role in orienting the organization's work — from its publications and one-off events to its annual flagship conferences.

Through preparatory workshops, European Horizons policy experts equip students with policy-writing, analysis, and rhetorical skills with the aim of educating and mentoring members to excel in the multifaceted and international arena of policy-making. The organization publishes Weekly Policy Briefs to keep its audiences informed on events relevant to European and Transatlantic affairs.

The organization's 2022-2023 policy priorities are:

- NATO and Transatlantic security

- Energy and Environment

- Defending European Democracy

- Artificial Intelligence and the Digital Sphere

In the past, European Horizons has worked on EU and US relations with Asia (2021–2022), combatting systemic racism (2020–2021), and defending democracy against cyber threats (2020–2021).

== Activities ==
European Horizons seeks to fulfill its mission through four core pillars of work:

1. Organizing policy-focused conferences, projects, and workshops.

2. Building a network of chapters, partners, and alumni.

3. Publishing innovative ideas.

4. Forming a new generation of young transatlantic leaders.

=== Flagship Conferences ===
European Horizons organizes several flagship events every year, including the European Student Conference, the European Horizons Policy Competition, and the Fall Policy Workshop.

The annual European Student Conference provides an opportunity for students and young professionals to share their ideas and vision for transatlantic relations and engage in debate with notable policy-makers, professors, and decision-makers from civil society and business.

The organization's Policy Competition allows teams of students to compete against each other in proposing solutions to a concrete policy problem. In 2021, teams pitched their ideas on how to make New Orleans more climate-resilient to the city's Office of Sustainability and Resilience. In 2022, the competition took place in Ghent to establish the city as a European Youth Hub. The competition co-created a long-lasting policy framework that can serve as a tool in preparing Ghent for its upcoming title of European Youth Capital in 2024. The winning team(s), aided by European Horizons, cooperated with Ghent toward a possible implementation of their policy ideas.

The Fall Policy Workshop is an annual workshop to equip young changemakers with the skills to analyze, understand, and write about policy. The workshop offers something to beginners as well as advanced policy writers. The Fall Policy Workshop's stated aim is to"empower participants to take their next step in the policy space" — whether this is contributing to the organization's academic journal, winning its Policy Competition, or embarking on a career in policymaking.

=== Publications ===
Publications are home to European Horizons' policy vision. The organization's short-form outlet, Transatlantic Perspectives, gives young leaders a platform to share their thoughts on transatlantic policy with a broad audience and in a condensed format.

The organization also publishes a peer-reviewed academic journal, The Review of European and Transatlantic Affairs (RETA). The journal features contributions from undergraduate and graduate students, scholars, policymakers, and politicians from around the world. The aim of RETA is to foster innovative ideas to address the challenges and possibilities confronting European and transatlantic affairs today.

=== Network of Chapters, Partners, and Alumni ===
Located at over sixty universities across three continents, chapters form the basis of European Horizons' network of students, prospective policymakers, and aspiring leaders. Each academic year, chapters pool their resources to organize keynote events, conduct in-depth research projects, and produce op-eds and policy memos.

European Horizons has established a long-term partnership with the Instrat Foundation – a Polish public policy think tank –, which culminated in European Horizons' first joint contribution to the European Commission's consultations on the New Competition Tool and the Digital Services Act (DSA). Within the same theme of digital innovation, organization's network has launched its first book in partnership with ASKO Europa-Stiftung, investigating the effects of technology on economics, culture, and politics.

European Horizons has various other partners including Debating Europe, Europäische Akademie Otzenhausen (EAO), EPIS Thinktank and Konrad Adenauer Stiftung. The organization has also worked closely with the European Parliament Liaison Office (EPLO) in Washington DC and London.

Since the organization's inception in 2015, European Horizons has grown through the founding of local student chapters, organizing the international European Horizons conferences, forming partnerships, and growing a network of financial backers. Today, the organization's alumni are represented in more than twenty countries on three continents and are engaged in various sectors, from advising governments and major companies to conducting research at high-ranking universities and international institutions.

=== European Horizons Delegations ===
Beyond organizing flagship activities, European Horizons undertakes political advocacy work, including sending delegations to events in the European and transatlantic space. One such event was a delegation to the European Youth Event, were the organization delivered a crisis simulation crisis simulation.

== Leadership ==
The organization was founded by four Yale students in 2014: Igor Mitschka, Melina Sanchez Montanes, Olga Karnas, and Paul Linden Retek.

=== Executive Directors ===
Executive Directors
Term	Name(s)
2015-2016	Nasos Abuel & Olga Karnas
2016-2017	Maximilian Krahé
2017-2018	Lucas Feuser
2018-2019	Jana Stehlíková & Pedro Maddens Toscano
2019-2022	Katerina Hoskova
2022-2023	Laurent Bélanger-Lowe
2023-2023	Lorenzo Donatelli

=== Advisory Board ===
European Horizons's advisory board has included Pascal Lamy, Klaus Welle, and Jean-Claude Trichet.
