= Jolyon Howorth =

British scholar (born 1945)

Jolyon M. Howorth
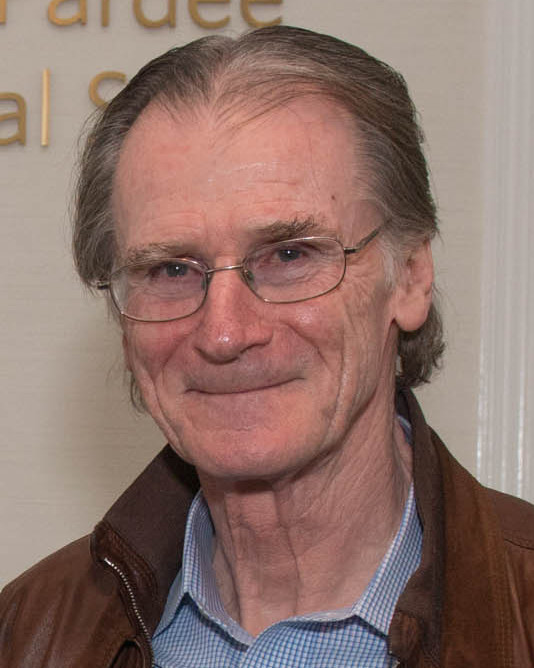
- Howorth in 2016
- Born: Jolyon Michael Howorth; 4 May 1945 (age 81); Blackpool, Lancashire, UK
- Occupation: teacher
- Years active: 1966–present
- Organisation(s): University of Bath, Harvard Kennedy School
- Website: Official website

Jolyon Michael Howorth (born 4 May 1945) is a British scholar of French history, European politics and defense policy. He is currently Jean Monnet Professor of European Politics and Professor Emeritus of European Studies at the University of Bath; and a Fellow at the Belfer Center for Science and International Affairs, Harvard University. He served as Visiting Professor of Public Policy at Harvard University’s Kennedy School of Government (2018–2019). He was Visiting Professor of Political Science and International Affairs at Yale University (2002–2018). He served as Professor of French Civilisation at the University of Bath from 1985 to 2004.

His previous appointments were at the University of Paris III: Sorbonne Nouvelle, University of Wisconsin–Madison and Aston University. He has held Visiting Professorships at Harvard University, the Institut d’Etudes Politiques (Sciences-Po, Paris), Luiss Guido Carli University (Rome), the Australian Defence Force Academy (Canberra) the University of Washington, Columbia University and New York University.

In addition, Howorth has held a Senior Research Fellowship at the European Union’s Institute for Security Studies. He is a Senior Research Associate at the Institut Français des Relations Internationales (Paris), a Fellow of the Royal Society of Arts in (UK), Chevalier dans l’Ordre des Palmes Académiques (France), and has been a Member of the Advisory Boards of the European Institute of Public Administration (Netherlands), the Centre for Defence Studies (UK), the Institut de Recherche Stratégique de l'Ecole Militaire (Paris), the Centre National Jean Jaurès (France), the European Policy Centre (Brussels) and the Centre for the Study of Security and Diplomacy (University of Birmingham, UK). He was a founder member of the Association for the Study of Modern and Contemporary France. In 2019, in recognition of his outstanding contribution to scholarship on France, he was granted French citizenship.

== Early life and education ==
Howorth was born in Blackpool, Lancashire, UK and brought up outside Oxford. His father was a photographer and his mother a head-teacher. He was educated at Rossall School (Fleetwood) and at Henry Box School (Witney). He holds a BA in French Studies (1966) from the University of Manchester and a PhD in French History (1972) from the University of Reading. From 1966 to 1967, he taught at the Collège de Genève in Geneva, Switzerland. From 1968 to 1977, he lived in Paris, where in 1969 he was appointed as a lecturer at the Université de la Sorbonne Nouvelle (Paris III).

Howorth’s scholarly work has encompassed social history, comparative politics, political science and international relations. He has published extensively in the field of French and European politics and history, especially security and defense policy and transatlantic relations – fifteen books and two hundred and fifty journal articles and chapters in books. His publications on transatlantic defence issues include: The European Union and National Defence Policy, London, 1997 (co-edited with Anand Menon); European Integration and Defence: The Ultimate Challenge? Paris, 2000; Defending Europe: the EU, NATO and the Quest for European Autonomy, London, 2003 (co-edited with John Keeler) and Security and Defence Policy in the European Union, London, 2007; 2nd edition 2014). His current research focuses on humanitarian intervention since the end of the Cold War and power transition in the 21st century.

Howorth has also served as an advisor for the transatlantic think-tank European Horizons; and for Fair Observer on foreign and defense policy as well as the changing nature of transatlantic relations. He has served on the editorial boards of Politique Etrangère; European Geostrategy; European Review of International Studies; Les Cahiers de Mars; Studia Diplomatica- the Brussels Journal of International Relations; Yale Journal of International Affairs; L'Evénement européen. From 1986 to 1990, he served (with George Ross) as Managing Editor of Contemporary France: a review of interdisciplinary studies. From 1996 to 2003, he served as General Editor of a series of monographs on Contemporary French Politics and Society, Berghahn Books (Oxford and New York).

== Research ==
Howorth’s work has covered three distinct fields: French social and political history during the Belle Epoque (1870–1914); French politics and particularly security, defence and nuclear policy since the 1960s; European security and defence policy and its relations with NATO (1990–present).

His Ph.D. dissertation examined the role in the creation of a unified socialist party in France of Edouard Vaillant. Howorth showed that, together with Jean Jaurès, Vaillant forged the intellectual and political compromise that synthesized the many different strands of the French left emerging out of the revolutionary tradition of the nineteenth century (Jacobinism, republicanism, Proudhonism, Blanquism, syndicalism and, eventually, Marxism). This synthesis led to the creation of the only unified socialist party in French history, the Section Française de l’Internationale Ouvrière (SFIO). The united left lasted only between 1905 and 1920. Howorth’s first book, Edouard Vaillant et la création de l'unité socialiste en France, Paris, 1982 (préface by Madeleine Rebérioux) was widely hailed as the definitive work on Vaillant as the father of the united left in France. That this unity did not survive the trauma of World War One was the subject of Howorth’s second major research project, which first drew him to international relations. Vaillant was the co-chair of the Second International and its most active member. Between 1900 and 1915, he corresponded almost daily with the International’s central office in Brussels. The overwhelming majority of this correspondence dealt with the looming threat of world war and with the prospects for a trans-national effort, led by the Second International, to avert the imminent catastrophe by organizing a general strike of all workers in all potentially belligerent countries. Howorth unearthed many hundreds of Vaillant’s letters in different archives across Europe and, together with Georges Haupt, published a critical edition of them as: Edouard Vaillant, délégué au Bureau socialiste international: correspondance avec le secretariat international, 1900-1915, Milan, Feltrinelli, 1976.

The collapse of the Second International over war and peace and the subsequent break-up of the SFIO with the creation of the pro-Moscow French Communist Party (PCF) in 1920 led Howorth to specialize more intensely in international relations and issues of war and peace. During several periods of study at Harvard’s Center for European Studies in the early 1980s, he came under the influence of Stanley Hoffmann. His research in the 1980s, at the height of the INF crisis, focused on France’s strategic distinctiveness within the Atlantic alliance. Not only was France, which had formally left the integrated military structures of NATO in 1966, unambiguously supportive of NATO’s policy of enhanced nuclear deployments in Europe, but France was the only European country whose domestic peace movement did not question the validity of the French nuclear deterrent. In two books published in 1984 (France: The Politics of Peace; and Defence and Dissent in Contemporary France – the latter co-edited with Patricia Chilton), he analysed French distinctiveness in historical, military and politico-cultural terms, demonstrating how Gaullism had inculcated in all sectors of the French population a belief that nuclear weapons were the ultimate guarantors of peace. These books were enthusiastically reviewed in the scholarly journals, the prestigious Bulletin of the Atomic Scientists concluding, in its review of The Politics of Peace, that “Howorth’s careful analysis of the French movement provides a model of how peace movements can and should be written about”. In a 1990 compendium of ten ground-breaking articles from the 1980s published in the journal Foreign Policy, the editor, Charles William Maynes, commented on Howorth’s Winter 1986–87 article: « In an extraordinary article, Howorth foresaw that the appearance of autonomous East-bloc peace movements and human rights organizations would gradually contribute to a transcontinental process whose aim w[ould] be to move cautiously towards […] a Europe free of blocs ».

Focusing in particular on French President François Mitterrand’s fourteen years in office (1981–1995), Howorth devoted around forty scientific papers to the analysis of the gradual embrace of fundamental Gaullist precepts by the man who had launched his presidential ambitions in 1965 by ridiculing France’s nuclear pretensions and by denouncing de Gaulle as the architect of a permanent coup d’état. This work, which combined research into French military strategy, institutional dynamics, defence economics and above all political culture, explained the progressive transformation of François Mitterrand into the ultimate protector and defender of France’s Gaullist legacy. It was for this sustained analysis that Howorth was honored, in 1994, by French prime minister Edouard Balladur with the award of Chevalier dans l’Ordre des Palmes Académiques.

The third strand of Howorth’s research began in the late-1980s as the imminent end of the Cold War induced an embryonic move, on the part of Europe’s nation states, to coordinate their foreign and defence policies. Using an essentially inductive methodology, based on hundreds of interviews, and in close cooperation with leading European think tanks – especially in Paris, where he has maintained a home for the past thirty years (L’Institut des Hautes Etudes de Défense Nationale; L’Institut Français des Relations Internationales; L’Institut d’Etudes de Sécurité de l’Union Européenne; l’Institut des Recherches Stratégiques de l’Ecole Militaire) – Howorth published five books and over one hundred and fifty journal articles or book chapters on the key aspects of what became known as the European Union’s Common Security and Defence Policy (CSDP): the 2000s quest for an EU military capacity that would be “autonomous” from NATO. In addition, he delivered papers at over four hundred international conferences in thirty countries on four continents. His work has deployed a range of theoretical approaches, depending on the subject matter. He has been diversely categorised by other scholars as a realist, an institutionalist and a constructivist. Realist theory has informed his many publications on the absence of European strategic thinking, as well as those focusing on the EU’s attempts to generate civilian and military capacity for crisis management missions. In his many analyses of the decision-making procedures in CSDP, he has deployed both institutionalist and constructivist approaches. His substantial analyses of relations between CSDP, the US and NATO have been informed by a mix of realism and institutionalism; while his critical work on the EU as a “normative power” has been based both on constructivist and on realist theories.

== The EU and NATO ==
In a number of publications in the 2010s, Howorth progressively advocated putting an end to the de facto division of labour between the EU and NATO whereby the latter remained responsible for collective defence in Europe, while the former sought to identify relatively minor tasks (peace-keeping, policing, military training, security sector reform) that differentiated it from NATO. In his earlier work, he had analysed CSDP’s quest for “autonomy” as a necessary development that would allow the EU to grow into a consequential military actor. By 2013, he had become convinced that this development was not happening in large part because of CSDP’s limited ambition, but also because as long as the Americans seemed prepared to bail the Europeans out whenever a serious crisis emerged on the EU’s door-step (Bosnia, Kosovo, Arab Spring and Libya, Russian annexation of Crimea, and meddling in Ukraine, the rise of ISIS) many EU member states were happy to “free-ride” on American security guarantees. At the same time, an increasing number of US analysts and politicians were demanding that the EU take responsibility for the stabilization of its own neighbourhood. Howorth’s alternative proposal, notably sponsored by the European People’s Party (the grouping of all of the EU’s conservative parties) was for CSDP to merge with NATO and, with the active assistance of the Americans, to undergo an “apprenticeship in leadership” that would allow for a rebalancing of responsibilities within the Alliance, facilitating European maturity, gradual assumption of leadership and a US re-focusing on the areas of the world considered to be the most crucial for Washington. This, he argued, was the original purpose of NATO and, in his view, the only serious future for the EU as a military actor. This thesis proved very controversial and was roundly rejected in many countries of Central and Eastern Europe.

== Personal life ==
Since 2001, Jolyon Howorth is married to Vivien Schmidt, a professor at Boston University. They divide their time between Boston, Paris and a “pre-retirement” villa on the Italian Riviera. Jolyon has three children from two previous marriages. Stephanie Hughes (doctor), Emily Jones (also a doctor), and Alex Howorth (foreign exchange broker).
