= Klaus Welle =

German politician

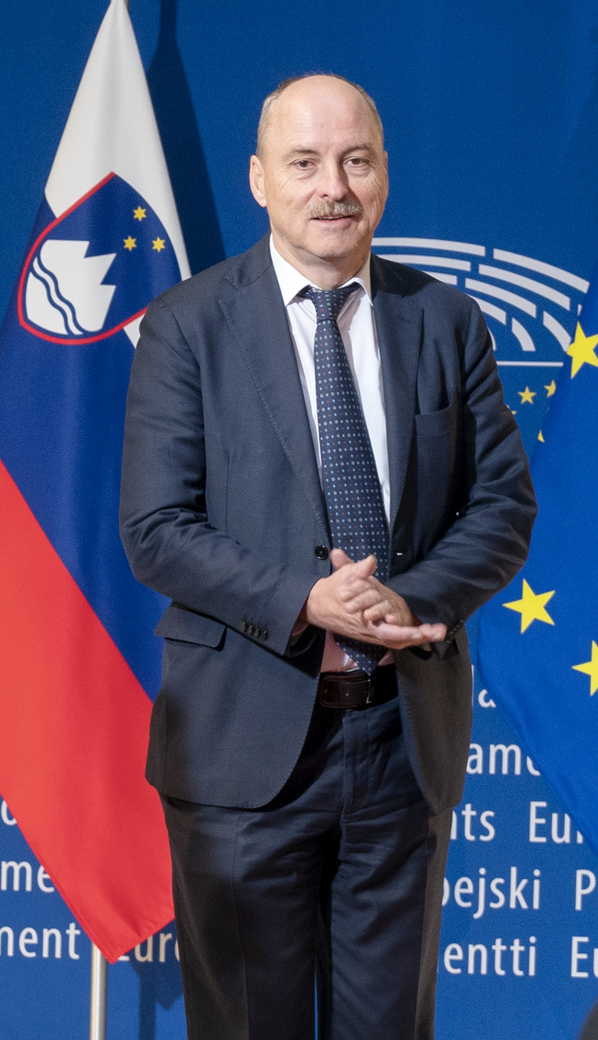

Secretary General of the European Parliament
- In office 15 March 2009 – December 2022
- President: Jerzy Buzek; Martin Schulz; Antonio Tajani; David Sassoli; Roberta Metsola
- Preceded by: Harald Rømer
- Succeeded by: Alessandro Chiocchetti

Personal details
- Born: 3 July 1964 (age 62) Beelen, West Germany (now Germany)
- Party: Christian Democratic Union
- Education: Witten/Herdecke University

Klaus Welle (born 3 July 1964) is a German politician who served as Secretary General of the European Parliament between 15 March 2009 to 31 December 2022. He was previously Head of the Office (chef de cabinet) of the President of the European Parliament, Hans-Gert Poettering MEP, from January 2007. He succeeded Harald Rømer, a Danish career civil servant, who had reached retirement age. Welle is also an advisor to the Yale University-based transatlantic think tank, European Horizons.

== Early life and education ==
Born in Beelen, Germany in July 1964, Welle completed professional training at WestLB in Münster and later studied economics at the Witten/Herdecke University.

== Career ==
A member of the Christian Democratic Union of Germany (CDU), Welle was a member of the national board of the party's youth organization Young Union (JU) from 1989 until 1998. From 1991 until 1995, he also chaired the Democrat Youth Community of Europe, which brought together Christian Democrat and Conservative students from across Europe.

From 1991 until 1994, Welle worked as Head of Foreign and European Affairs for the CDU party in Bonn, serving under successive Secretaries General Volker Rühe and Peter Hintze. A strong admirer of Chancellor Helmut Kohl, he made his political reputation by masterminding an unexpectedly strong CDU performance in the 1994 European elections.

Welle then served as Secretary General of the European People's Party (EPP) – the transnational, centre-right, European political party – before becoming Secretary General of the EPP Group, then known as the EPP-ED Group, in the European Parliament. He was subsequently appointed as the first Director General for EU Internal Policies (DG IPOL) within the general secretariat of the European Parliament, the administrative department which services the 17 parliamentary committees dealing with domestic EU issues.

During his time with both the EPP transnational party and EPP Group in the EP, Welle is credited with the strategy of opening the formerly Christian Democrat alliance to a broader range of conservative and liberal political forces, so consolidating most of the mainstream European centre-right under an EPP umbrella. This approach culminated in the EPP Group becoming the largest political group in the European Parliament in June 1999, a position that it has enjoyed ever since. As Secretary General of the EPP party and EPP Group, Welle played a key part in keeping the British Conservative MEPs in the group – especially during the period from 1997, when the party moved into Opposition at Westminster – by negotiating or suggesting compromise solutions designed to allow them a high degree of autonomy. Since 2004, the EPP has also been the strongest political force in the main EU institutions as a whole, with Welle still perceived as an important behind-the-scenes influence at senior level within EPP politics. In the run-up to the 2014 European elections, for example, he played a particularly important role in advocating the fielding of lead candidates or 'Spitzenkandidaten' by the various European political parties.

As Secretary General of the European Parliament from 2009 to 2022, Welle interpreted his role in a more proactive way than most of his predecessors, strongly emphasising the Parliament's role as a law-making body, especially given the significant boost in powers the institution received under the Lisbon Treaty. He promoted a long-run shift in the use of staff resources towards policy work, and away from back-office administration and traditional overheads, notably translation and interpretation. He has strengthened the policy staff servicing parliamentary committees, has emphasised the importance of ex-ante and ex-post evaluation, so that the Parliament can insert itself more effectively in the whole EU policy cycle, and established a new European Parliamentary Research Service (EPRS) to support such work. He used his position to strengthen the Parliament's position in inter-institutional relations, not only with the European Commission, but also with the EU Council of Ministers. He also boosted links with the US Congress by opening an EP representative office in Washington DC.

On 6 June 2022 the European Parliament Bureau accepted Welle's announcement that he would leave the post of Secretary General at the end of the year.

In April 2023, Welle joined the Wilfried Martens Centre as Academic Council Chairman. He is also a vising professor at the London School of Economics.

== Other activities ==
- Konrad Adenauer Foundation (KAS), Member

Welle is also an advisor to the Yale University-based transatlantic student think tank, European Horizons.

== Controversy ==
On 23 May 2010, British newspaper Sunday Times, citing an anonymous source, alleged that Welle intended to provide an Apple iPad to each of the [then] 736 MEPs. The article suggested that earmarking money for iPads was not the best example of austerity, at a time when EU member states were suffering severe budget deficits. However, a Parliament spokesperson interviewed for the article was reportedly unaware of any such initiative. Welle, however, has promoted moves to a 'paperless' Parliament, developing, for example, an 'eCommittee' facility, whereby Members can table amendments and undertake some other aspects of committee work electronically.

Party political offices
Preceded by Neale Stevenson	Chairperson of the Democrat Youth Community of Europe; 1991–1994	Succeeded by Arthur Winkler-Hermaden
Political offices
Preceded by Harald Rømer	Secretary General of the European Parliament; 2009–2022	Succeeded by Alessandro Chiocchetti
