= European Parliament in Luxembourg =

The European Parliament's presence in Kirchberg, Luxembourg currently consists of the Parliament's secretariat, although the Parliament had held plenary sessions in the city for a brief period.

== History ==
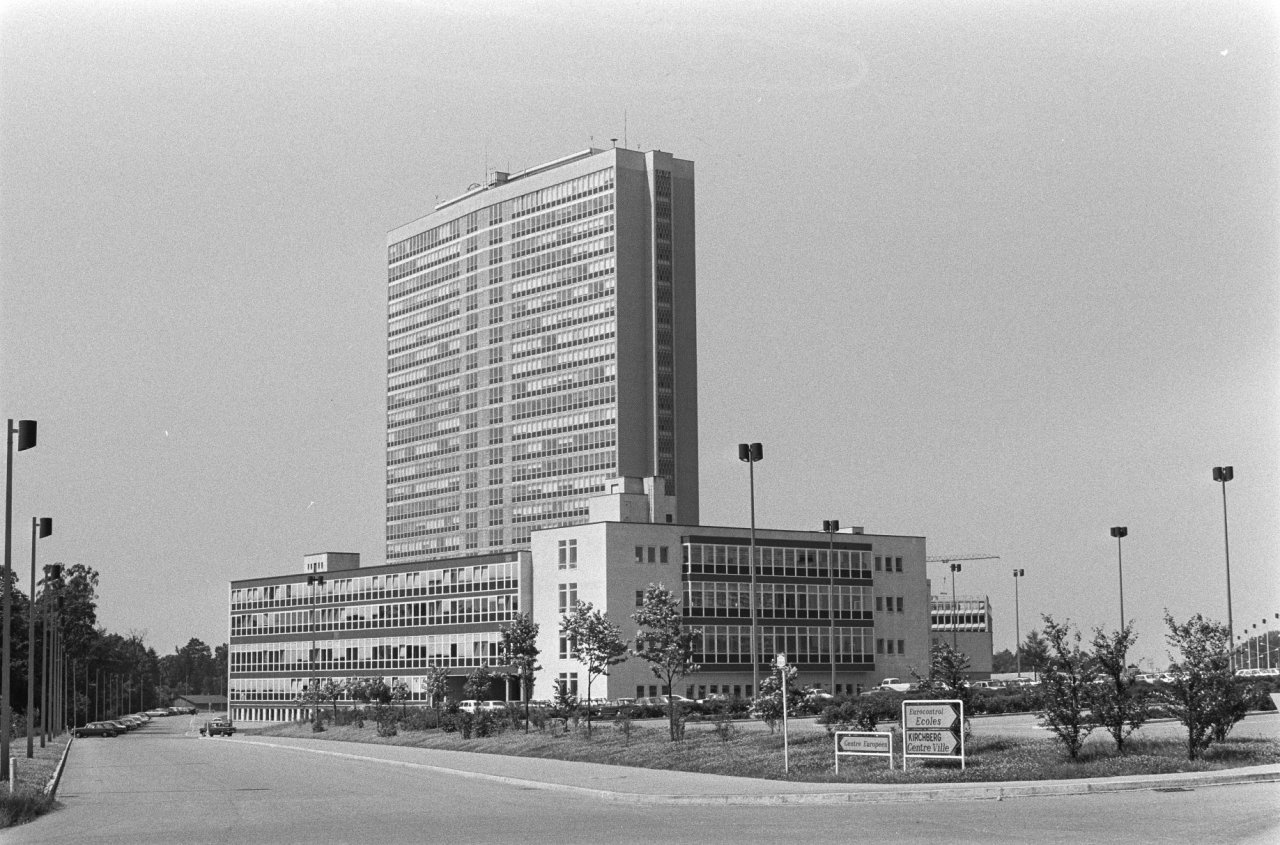
Alcide De Gasperi building housed the Secretariat of the European Parliament

The provisional arrangement was reiterated on 8 April 1965 with the Decision on the provisional location of certain institutions and departments of the Communities. This was following the Merger Treaty, which combined the executives of the three Communities into a single institutional structure. However, with the merged executives, the Commission and most departments were grouped together in Brussels, rather than Luxembourg City. To compensate Luxembourg for the loss, the agreement granted a city the right to host a number of bodies, including the Secretariat of the Assembly (now of the Parliament).

Despite the 1965 agreement, however, the Parliament's seat was a source of contention. Wishing to be closer to the activities in Brussels and Luxembourg City, a few plenary sessions were held by the Parliament between 1967 and 1981 in Luxembourg instead of Strasbourg – against the wishes of France and in 1981 it returned to holding sessions entirely in Strasbourg.

Robert Schuman building

== Buildings ==
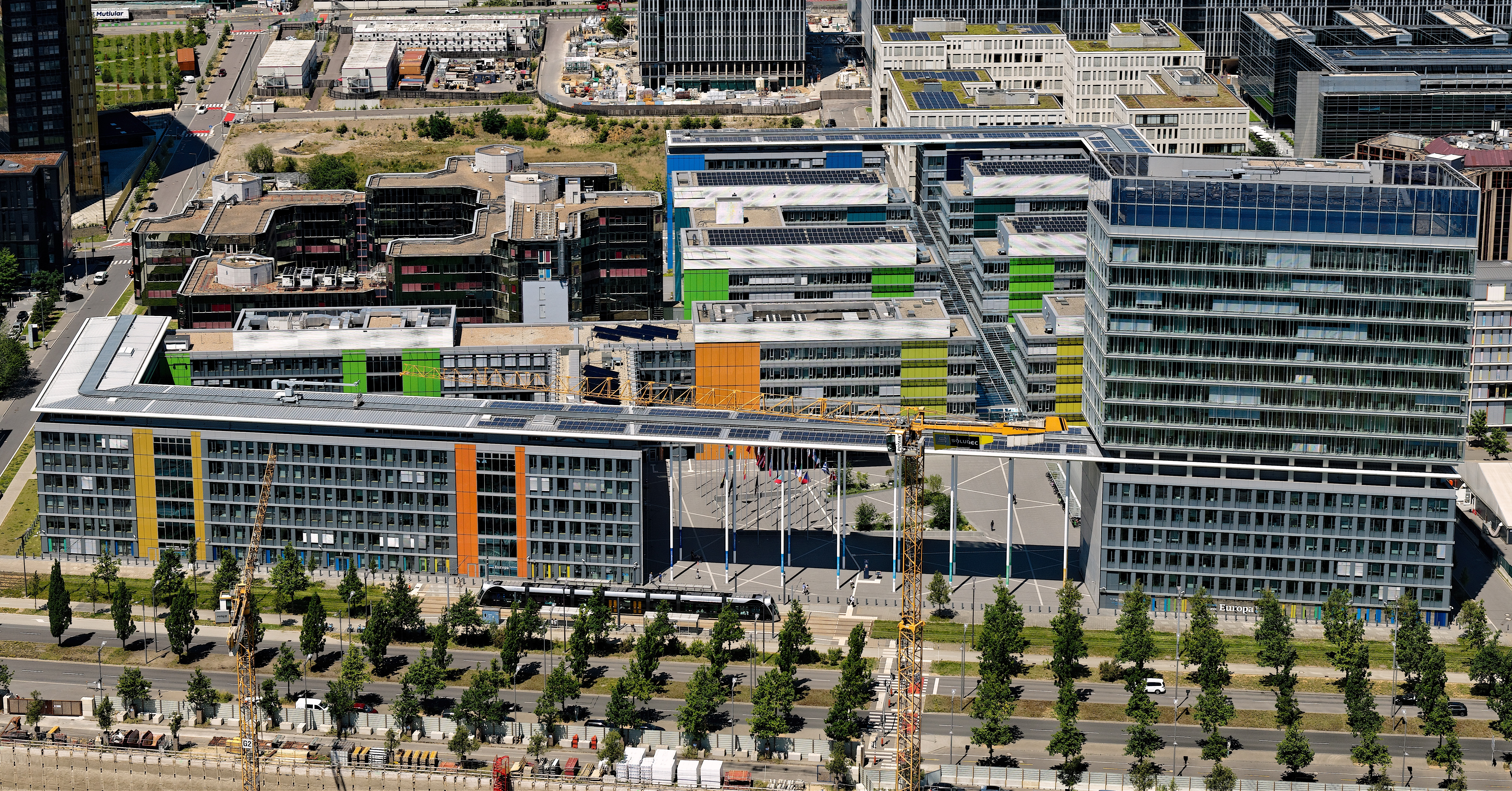
Konrad Adenauer building

There are a handful of buildings in Luxembourg used by the Parliament. The city hosts the Secretariat of the European Parliament (employing over 4000 people), mostly based in the Kirchberg district.

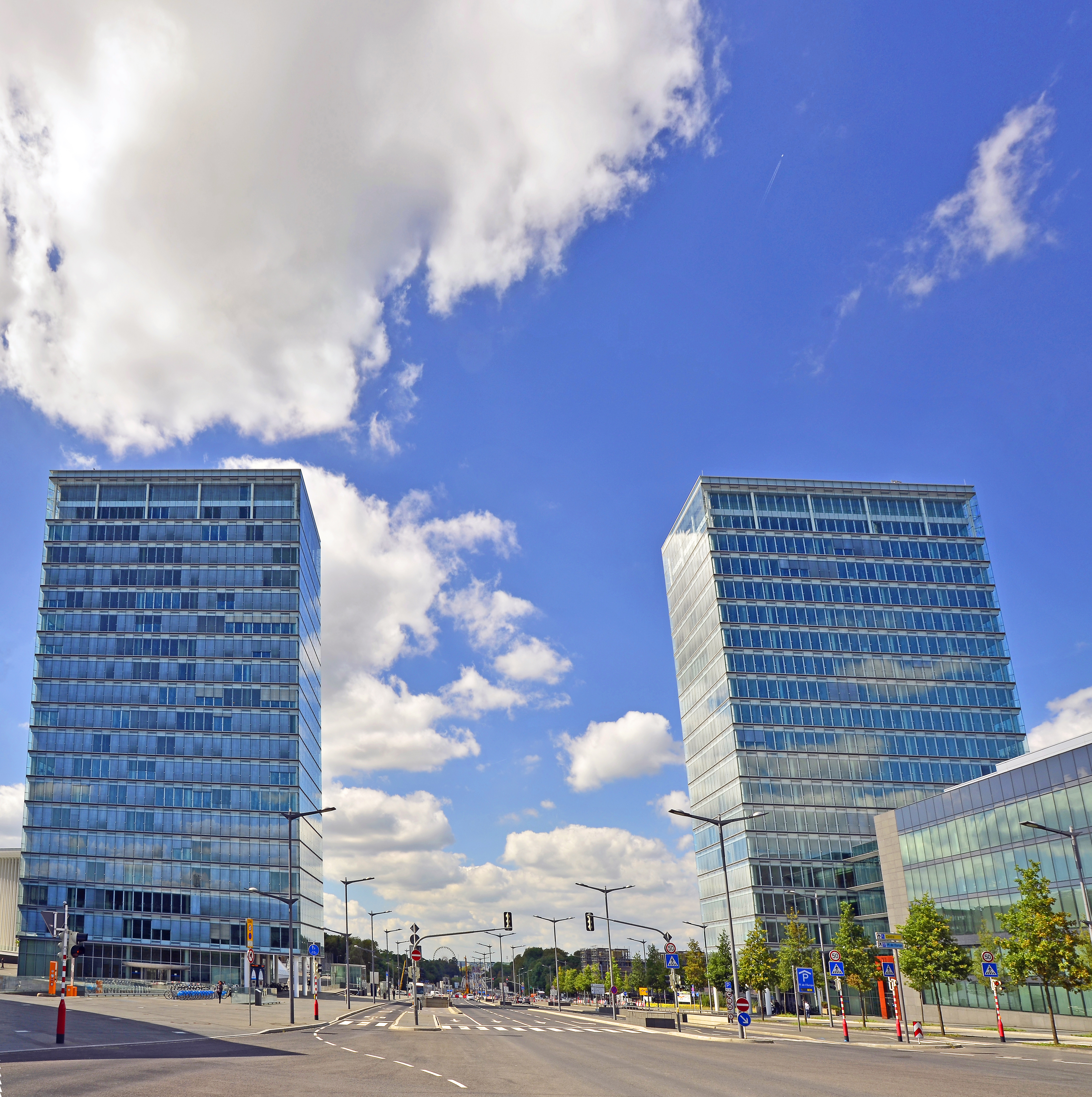
TOA and TOB, known as La Porte de l'Europe

The buildings in use are the ones named after Robert Schuman (49.618176°N 6.140885°E) and Konrad Adenauer (49.621686°N 6.146743°E) and two tower buildings (TOA and TOB) either side of Av. John F. Kennedy (49.619566°N 6.142956°E).

Some services are installed in the Gold Bell building (49.587175°N 6.113736°E) in the south of the city. The old hemicycle in Luxembourg City still exists despite no longer being used by the Parliament since 1981 (it is now the seat of the EFTA Court).

== See also ==
- European Parliament
- Seat of the European Parliament in Strasbourg
- Espace Léopold
- Alcide De Gasperi building
- Institutional seats of the European Union
