= Alessandro Chiocchetti =

Secretary General of the European Parliament

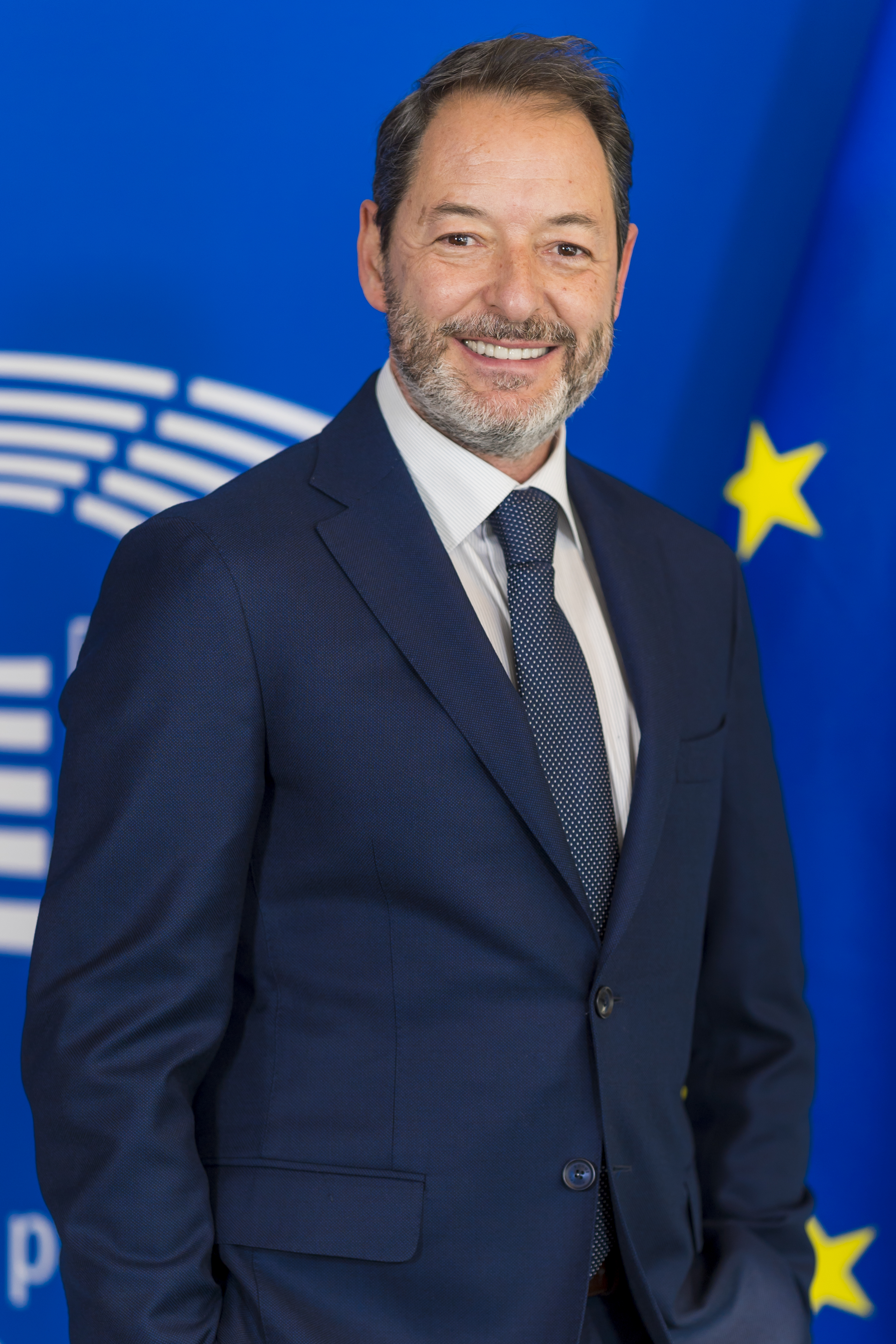
- Official portrait, 2024

Secretary-General of the European Parliament
- Incumbent
- Assumed office 1 January 2023
- President: Roberta Metsola
- Preceded by: Klaus Welle

Personal details
- Born: 4 November 1968 (age 57) Moena, Italy
- Education: University of Padua

Alessandro Chiocchetti (Italian: [alesˈsandro kjokˈketti]; born 4 November 1968) is a European Union civil servant who has served as the Secretary-General of the European Parliament since 1 January 2023.

== Education ==
Alessandro Chiocchetti holds a degree in Political Science and International Law from the University of Padua. He also obtained a postgraduate diploma in International Law, Economics, History, and European Integration.

== Career ==
From 2009 to 2011, he served as a Member of the Cabinet of the Secretary General of the European Parliament. He then worked as the Head of the Legislative Coordination Unit and the Secretariat of the Conference of Committee Chairs from 2011 to 2017. Between 2017 and 2019, Chiocchetti was the Deputy Head of the Cabinet for European Parliament President Antonio Tajani. From 2019 to 2022, he held the position of Director for Legislative and Committees' Coordination within the Directorate-General for Internal Policies of the Union.

In 2022, he became the Head of the Cabinet for European Parliament President Roberta Metsola, before being appointed Secretary-General of the European Parliament in January 2023.
