= European Parliamentary Research Service =

European Union in-house research department

- Formation: November 2013
- Headquarters: Brussels
- Director-General: Mr Anders Rasmussen
- Website: https://epthinktank.eu/

The European Parliamentary Research Service (EPRS) is the in-house research department and think tank of the European Parliament, providing research and analytical support to the members of the European Parliament, its parliamentary committees and the Parliament as a whole. It was created in November 2013 as a directorate-general within the Parliament's permanent administration. The EPRS philosophy is to provide independent, objective and authoritative analysis of, and research on, policy issues relating to the European Union, in order to assist Members in their parliamentary work.

EPRS products and services include research for members, ‘EU Legislation in progress’ briefings, and tailored training courses. EPRS also supports and promotes parliamentary outreach to the wider public.

The creation of the EPRS may be explained by the desire in the early 2010s to ensure the "[…] more rational organization" of the European Parliament's permanent administration, notably of DG Presidency, which dealt at the time "with a number of not necessarily related matters (security services, library and lawyer linguists); in this context the Library could be separated from DG Presidency and developed into a new Directorate-General for Parliamentary Research Services, with about 200 staff, by bringing together, in a budgetary neutral way" existing services with an analytical focus.

== History ==
At the initiative of former Secretary-General Klaus Welle, the EPRS was established on 1 November 2013 as a directorate-general (DG) within the Parliament's permanent administration, bringing together several analytical and support services for Members of the European Parliament and/or parliamentary committees. The first Director-General was Anthony Teasdale.

The creation of EPRS followed a detailed analysis, undertaken by a Joint Working Group of the Parliament’s Bureau and Budgets Committee, of the strengths and weaknesses of the various kinds of support given to Members in their parliamentary work. It recommended that the provision of ‘independent scientific advice’ to Members and analytical support in exercising scrutiny and oversight of the executive should both be enhanced.

The overall purpose of establishing the new directorate-general was to create a research service at the disposal of the European Parliament that was capable of providing Members and committees with independent, objective and authoritative research on, and analysis of, policy issues relating to the European Union. The aim was also to increase the practical capacity of Members and committees to scrutinise and oversee the European Commission and other executive bodies during successive stages of the EU policy cycle. All publications by EPRS are freely available to the general public.

To strengthen administrative support in these fields, the new directorate-general brought together, in the form of a single service, two previously separate entities - the Directorate for the Library (previously located in DG Presidency) and the Directorate for Impact Assessment and European Added Value (previously in DG Internal Policies) - and added to them a new directorate, the Members’ Research Service, a service which the Parliament had previously been lacking.

== Services ==
The EPRS is organised into four Directorates and five horizontal units. EPRS is headed by Director-General Anders Rasmussen. Together, they provide a range of products and services.

=== Overview of Services ===
Research for Members

EPRS produces a range of publications on major EU policies, issues and legislation, in the form of short ‘at a glance’ notes, briefings, analyses and studies. It also answers requests for research and analysis from MEPs and their staff.

Members hotline

The Members’ Hotline offers clients a single point of contact for accessing all EPRS services. Any MEP can make a request at any time to the Members’ Research Service for information, research or analysis on EU policies, issues or legislation. A tailored analysis or other personalised material may also be prepared to meet Members’ needs.

AskEP

In cases where citizens have a question for the European Parliament, they can contact EPRS’ AskEP service directly. The AskEP service answers enquiries from the public about the Parliament and its views on EU issues.

What Europe Does for Me

The interactive, multilingual, ‘What Europe Does For Me’ online website, presents hundreds of one-page notes that provide examples of how the EU makes a difference to people's lives. Users can find specific information about what Europe does for their region and the impact that it has on their professional lives or favourite pastime. In 2019, EPRS won the European Ombudsman’s 2019 Award for Good Administration in the category of ‘Excellence in communications’ for the ‘What Europe Does For Me’ initiative.

Legislative Train

‘EU Legislation in Progress’ briefings aim to provide Members of the European Parliament with analysis on all substantial proposals for EU legislation at every stage of the legislative procedure. Each briefing includes an account of the purpose, content and legal aspects of the proposed legislation, in particular analysing what the legislation would change, as well as any previous legislation and its background. An overview of stakeholders’ views is also provided, as well as the opinions of national parliaments and the two advisory committees: the European Committee of the Regions and the European Economic and Social Committee.

EPRS Scrutiny Toolbox

The Scrutiny Toolbox was set up to help Members of the European Parliament check review clauses in legislation and in international agreements, find out about ex-post evaluations carried out by the European Commission, and follow up on the work of the European Council and the European Court of Auditors.

== Organisation ==
=== Horizontal Units ===
The Strategy and Innovation Unit (INNO) is directly attached to the office of the Director-General. Its main objectives consist of assisting the Director-General in overseeing horizontal issues within the DG, coordinating services for Members and their staff, delivering a coherent internal and external communication strategy for the DG, enhancing cooperation with European and international think tanks and research institutions, and ensuring inter-DG cooperation within the Parliament's administration.

The Publications Management and Editorial Unit (PMEU) provides a publications management and editorial service for the whole of DG EPRS, to ensure a consistently high standard in all its publications, in terms of both content and form. It coordinates publication processes, provides statistical/graphics advice, and develops and applies standards for all EPRS publications.

The Linking the Levels Unit (LINK): The unit's main objectives consist of assisting the Director General.

The Strategic Foresight and Capabilities Unit (SFOR) supports the European Parliament by generating and coordinating analytical work on EU risks, vulnerabilities, capabilities, opportunities and gaps with a view to promoting a higher degree of resilience and strategic autonomy.

The European Parliament History Service (HIST) has been created to publish historical studies on the development of the European Parliament as a political institution, and on the evolution of the EU more generally, drawing inter alia on the archives of both the European Parliament and the European Union.

=== Directorates ===
The Directorate for the Members' Research Service, MRS (Directorate A) provides all Members of the European Parliament with independent, objective and authoritative analysis of, and research on, EU-related policy issues, in order to assist them in their parliamentary work. [1] The MRS is organised into six policy units, covering: economic policies (EPOL); structural policies (SPOL); citizens' policies (CPOL), budgetary policies (BPOL); digital policies (DPOL) and external policies (XPOL). The MRS also contains two specialist services for monitoring delivery of EU climate action goals and the Next Generation EU recovery fund. Its policy analysts and information specialists aim to support Members in their work on all policy issues dealt with by the Parliament or the EU institutions as a whole. The analysis or research produced by the Members' Research Service follow two different logics, they are either prepared following a specific request from a Member of the European Parliament or one of their assistants, or the EPRS drafts a publication on a proactive basis.

The Directorate for Impact Assessment and European Added Value (Directorate B) acts as an information and analysis centre on ex-ante and ex-post work carried out by the European Parliament, European Commission and other bodies. The Directorate is organised into five units dealing with various aspects of ex-ante or ex-post evaluation of EU legislation and policies, and scientific foresight. The services of Directorate B aim to strengthen the European Parliament’s practical capacity for scrutiny and oversight of the executive at the successive stages of the EU legislative and policy cycles – upstream and downstream of law being adopted - as well as contributing to the quality of legislation itself. The directorate is composed of the European Added Value Unit, the Ex-Ante Impact Assessment Unit, the Ex-Post Evaluation Unit, the European Council Oversight Unit, and the Strategic Foresight and Capabilities Unit.

The Panel for the Future of Science and Technology (STOA) is a panel of 27 Members of the European Parliament devoted to all issues related to science and technology assessment. The Scientific Foresight Unit is part of EPRS' Directorate B. Its task is to carry out expert, independent assessments of the impact of new technologies and to identify long-term, strategic policy options useful for the Parliament's committees in their policy-making role. STOA's work is carried out in partnership with external experts.

The panel consists of the vice-president of the Parliament responsible for STOA, and six Members of the Committee on Industry, Research and Energy (ITRE); three members each from a further five Committees: Environment, Public Health and Food safety (ENVI), Internal Market and Consumer Protection (IMCO), Employment and Social Affairs (EMPL), Transport and Tourism (TRAN), Agriculture and Rural Development (AGRI) and an additional Member from each of the following six Committees: Civil Liberties, Justice & Home Affairs (LIBE), Legal Affairs (JURI), Culture and Education (CULT), Regional Development (REGI), and International Trade (INTA).

The Directorate for the Library and Knowledge Services (Directorate C) provides Members of the European Parliament and parliamentary staff with physical and digital books, journals, newspapers, newswires, databases and other information sources.

It operates the Library Reading Rooms in Brussels and Strasbourg, housing the Parliament’s extensive physical and digital collection of books and journals, which it acquires and manages. It provides online access to subscription-based publications for and throughout the Parliament as a whole. It answers citizens’ enquiries about both the Parliament and the EU generally. The Directorate for the Library is organised into five units: Library Reading Room Unit, Digital Library Unit, Citizens’ Enquiries Unit, Comparative Law Library Unit and European Parliament History Service.

The Directorate for Resources' (Directorate D) overarching objective is to assure an optimal resourcing of DG EPRS’ priorities, notably at times of increasing resource scarcity.

== See also ==
- European Parliament
- Secretariat of the European Parliament
