= EuroCap-Rail =

EuroCap-Rail (also spelled Eurocaprail or Eurocap Rail) is a proposed 397-kilometre (247 mi) high-speed rail corridor through Belgium, Luxembourg, and France to connect three cities—unofficially considered the capitals of the European Union—which host six of the seven institutions of the European Union: Brussels, Luxembourg, and Strasbourg. The project would upgrade rail lines from Brussels to Luxembourg (city) to Baudrecourt, France and utilize the LGV Est (opened in July 2016) between Baudrecourt and Strasbourg. EuroCap-Rail is a priority project among the Trans-European Transport Networks.

Construction never started, but almost €100 million was allocated to improve the existing railway line between Luxembourg and Brussels. That proved little use.

The Belgian plan, part of the Next Generation EU recovery package, includes planned upgrades to the existing line 162 (Namur - Luxembourg border), such as increasing speeds to 160 km/h, protection against falling rocks and station modernisation. By 2024, Brussels - Luxembourg trains should reach their destination within two hours.
