= Institutional seats of the European Union =

Institutional seats as fixed in Protocol 6:

Brussels: Commission, Council of Ministers, European Council, Parliament (2nd)
Frankfurt am Main: Central Bank
Luxembourg: Secretariat of the European Parliament, Council of Ministers (2nd), Court of Justice of the European Union, Court of Auditors, Commission (various departments and services)
Strasbourg: Parliament

* Fixed, but with leeway for meetings elsewhere.

The seven institutions of the European Union (EU) are seated in four different cities, which are Brussels (Belgium), Frankfurt am Main (Germany), Luxembourg (Luxembourg) and Strasbourg (France), rather than being concentrated in a single capital city. The EU agencies and other bodies are located all across the union, but usually not fixed in the treaties. The Hague is the only exception, as the fixed seat of the Agency for Law Enforcement Cooperation (Europol). Luxembourg City is the EU capital that can lay claim to having the most of the seven EU institutions based wholly or partly upon its territory, with only the European Council and European Central Bank not having a presence in the city. Over the years, Brussels has become the EU's political hub, with the College of the Commissioners — the European Commission's politically accountable executive — and the European Council both meeting at their Brussels-based headquarters, and the European Parliament and Council of the EU holding the majority of their meetings annually within the city. This has led media to describe it as the de facto "capital of the EU."

The seats have been a matter of political dispute since the states first failed to reach an agreement at the establishment of the European Coal and Steel Community in 1952. However, a final agreement between member states was reached in 1992, and later attached to the Treaty of Amsterdam.

Despite this, the seat of the European Parliament remains controversial. The work of Parliament is divided between Brussels, Luxembourg City and Strasbourg, which is seen as a problem due to the large number of MEPs, staff, and documents which need to be moved. As the locations of the major seats have been enshrined in the treaties of the European Union, Parliament has no right to decide its own seat.

Locating new bodies is also not without political disputes. The European Central Bank's (ECB) seat had to symbolise its independence from political control, and was located in a city which did not already host a national government or European institution. Some new agencies have also been based in eastern Europe since 2004 to balance their distribution across the EU.

== Locations ==
The treaties of the European Union outline the locations of the following institutions: The European Parliament has its seat in Strasbourg, hosting twelve monthly plenary sessions (including budget session). Brussels hosts additional sessions and committees (including being used in September 2008 for normal sittings when the Strasbourg chamber was damaged). Luxembourg City hosts the Secretariat of the European Parliament. The Council of the European Union has its seat in Brussels, except during April, June, and October, when meetings are held in Luxembourg City.

The European Commission also has its seat in Brussels, although some departments and services are hosted by Luxembourg City. The Court of Justice of the European Union, (along with its component courts, the European Court of Justice and the General Court), the Court of Auditors and the European Investment Bank are based in Luxembourg City. The Economic and Social Committee and the Committee of the Regions are entirely based in Brussels while the European Central Bank is based in Frankfurt and Europol is the only agency to have its seat fixed by the treaties, in The Hague.

Separately, the Treaty of Nice establishes Brussels as the venue for all formal summits of the European Council after 2004. However some extraordinary sessions are sometimes held outside the city. The European Council's seat is however fixed by a declaration rather than a protocol, meaning it is less binding than the other seats.

The 2011 Treaty Establishing the European Stability Mechanism (ESM) states that the seat of the ESM must be in Luxembourg.

=== Non-fixed seats ===
There are numerous other bodies and agencies that have not had their seats fixed by treaties. Brussels hosts the European Defence Agency (as NATO and formerly the WEU are also in the city). Luxembourg City hosts the Translation Centre for the Bodies of the European Union and the European Investment Bank. Strasbourg and Brussels both host the offices of the European Ombudsman. The other agencies are spread across Europe and since the 2004 enlargement, there has been a drive to locate more agencies in the new member-states to make a more equal distribution.

=== Commission departments ===
Although the commission is mainly based in Brussels, some of its departments are required to be based in Luxembourg City since the 1965 agreement which listed the following for Luxembourg City; ECSC financial departments, the DG for Credit and Investments, the department which collects the ECSC levy and attached accounts departments; the Publications Office with related sales and proofreading services and CORDIS; the EEC Statistical Office and data-processing department; the EEC and ECSC departments for hygiene and industrial safety; DG for Health; DG for Euratom safeguards and any appropriate administrative and technical infrastructure for these.

As departments have changed over the years, some are no longer present as they have been abolished or merged, with most departments present being mainly based in Brussels while retaining a minor presence in Luxembourg City. There are however some departments which are still entirely based in the city per the 1965 agreement.

=== "Capital" ===
The treaties or declarations of the EU have not declared any city as the "capital" of the EU in any form. However, informally the term has found usage despite connotations out of step with the normal perceptions surrounding an inter/supranational entity. Brussels is frequently the subject of the label, particularly in publications by local authorities, the Commission and press. Indeed, the city of Brussels interprets the 1992 agreement on seats (details below) as declaring Brussels as the capital. Likewise, authorities in Strasbourg and organisations based there refer to Strasbourg as the "capital" of Europe (often wider Europe due to the presence of the Council of Europe there as well) and Brussels, Strasbourg and Luxembourg City are also referred to as the joint capitals of Europe, for example in relation to the "EuroCap-Rail" project: a railway that would link "the three European capitals".

== History ==
At the founding of the European Coal and Steel Community (ECSC) in 1951, the states could not agree which city should host the institutions of the new community. Brussels was widely preferred, but was vetoed by Belgium which insisted on Liège. Because of the impasse, Luxembourg City was chosen as a provisional choice for all but the Assembly (Parliament), which was to be based in Strasbourg. Two further communities were created in 1957 and again a provisional agreement laid out that the Assembly would meet in Strasbourg, the Court would meet in Luxembourg City, and the Commissions and Councils would be split between Luxembourg City and Brussels. These institutions later started to be concentrated in the latter city.

As various agreements were reached, activities in Luxembourg City gradually shifted to Brussels and the Parliament, although bound to remain in Strasbourg, also started to work in Brussels while the Court remained in Luxembourg City. The final agreement in 1992 set up the present arrangement, including the division of the Parliament's work between the three cities. In 2002, the European Council, having previously rotated between different cities, decided to base itself in Brussels.

=== Beginning ===
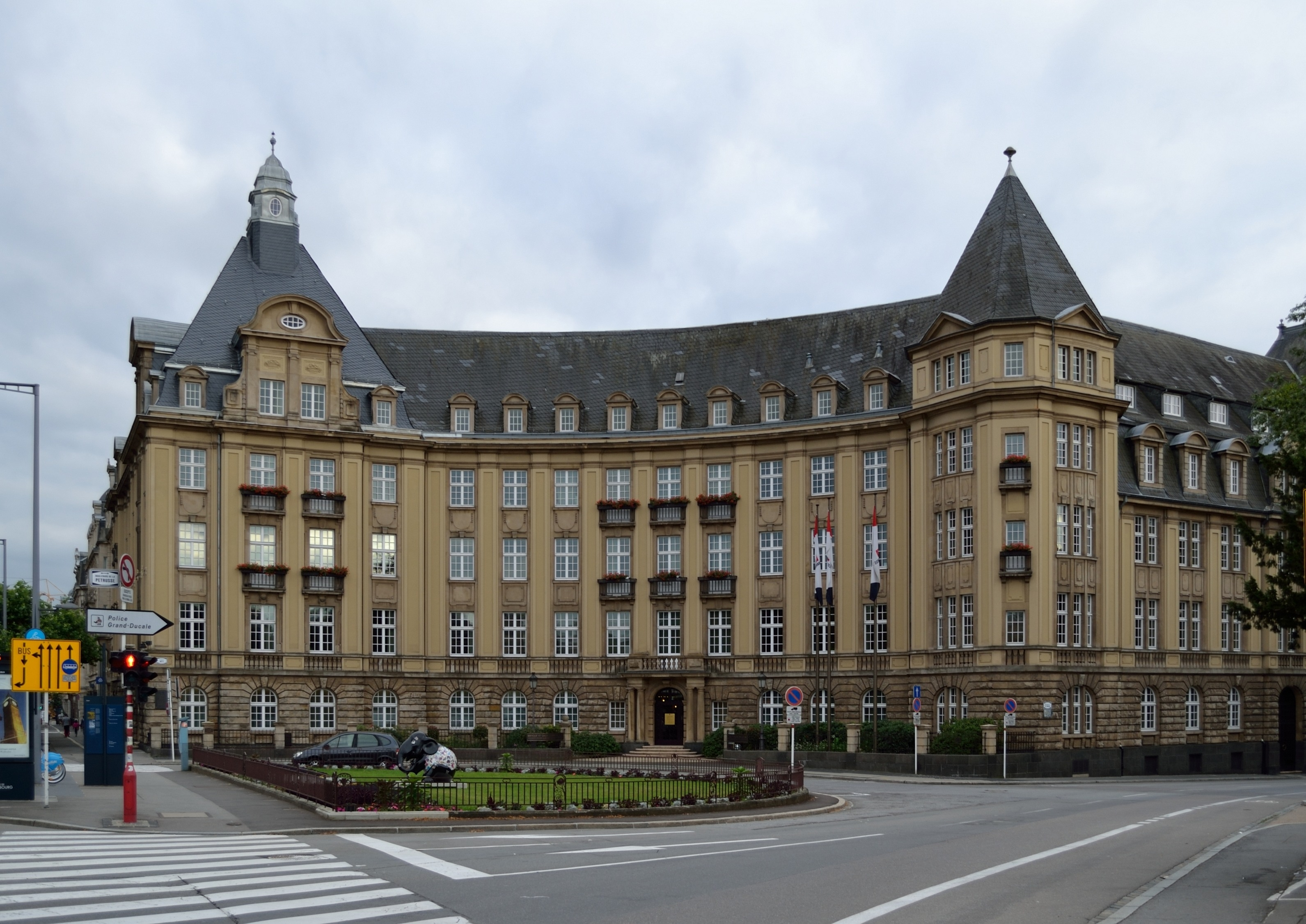
The former headquarters of the High Authority in Luxembourg City

The ECSC was founded by the Treaty of Paris in 1951; however, there was no decision on where to base the institutions of the new community. The treaties allowed for the seat(s) to be decided by common accord of governments, and at a conference of the ECSC members on 23 July 1952 no permanent seat was decided.

The seat was contested, with Liège, Luxembourg, Strasbourg and Turin all considered. While Saarbrücken had a status as a "European city" (Europeanised presence and control), the ongoing dispute over Saarland made it a problematic choice. Brussels would have been accepted at the time, but divisions within the then-unstable Belgian government ruled that option out.

To break the deadlock, Joseph Bech, then Prime Minister of Luxembourg, proposed that Luxembourg City be made the provisional seat of the institutions (including the Council and High Authority) until a permanent agreement was reached.

In 1958, after the Treaty of Rome came into effect the new members of the community had to again decide on a seat. In early 1958 they could not come to a conclusion, and various cities began to lobby for the position. It was decided that in principle all of the institutions should be located in one city as soon as feasible. Brussels, Strasbourg, Luxembourg, Turin, Milan, Stresa, Paris, Nice, and the French Department of Oise were all considered by the "European Committee of Town-Planning Experts" in a report to the Council of Ministers. However, even after the presentation of the report the countries could not agree, and in June 1959 a three-year moratorium on the decision was set. The delay helped Brussels establish itself as the seat, since it was already functioning as much of the administration was already working there in offices space loaned from the Belgian government. During this time Belgium, Germany, the Netherlands, and the European institutions themselves favoured Brussels; Luxembourg City wanted to maintain the seat of the ECSC (or be generously compensated); France supported Strasbourg, and Italy continued to promote Milan.

However, it was decided that the Common Assembly, which became the Parliament, should instead be based in Strasbourg—the Council of Europe (CoE) was already based there, in the House of Europe. The chamber of the CoE's Parliamentary Assembly could also serve the Common Assembly, and they did so until 1999, when a new complex of buildings was built across the river from the Palace.

=== Provisional agreement ===
The creation in 1957 of the European Economic Community (EEC) and the European Atomic Energy Community (EAEC or Euratom) created new duplicate institutions to the ECSC (except for the Parliamentary Assembly and Court of Justice, which were shared). On 7 January 1958, it was decided that Brussels, Luxembourg City, and Strasbourg would again be provisional venues until a final decision. Strasbourg would retain the Assembly, Luxembourg City the Court and both Brussels and Luxembourg City would host meetings of the Councils and Commissions (or High Authority). The discretion of the exact meeting place of the new Councils was given to the President of the Council. In practice, this was to be in the Château of Val-Duchesse until the autumn of 1958, at which point it would move to 2 Rue Ravensteinstraat in Brussels. Meanwhile, the ECSC Council was still based in Luxembourg City, holding its meetings in the Cercle Municipal on Place d’Armes. Its secretariat moved within the city on numerous occasions, but between 1955 and 1967, it was housed in the Verlorenkost district.

On 21 June 1958, the Parliamentary Assembly recommended to the Council that the Assembly should have its seat in the same place where the other organisations are based, although it accepted that plenary sessions could be held elsewhere. The Assembly also nominated three cities to be the seat of the institutions (Brussels, Strasbourg and Milan), however no permanent agreement was reached.

The provisional arrangement was reiterated on 8 April 1965 with the "Decision on the provisional location of certain institutions and departments of the Communities". This was following the Merger Treaty, which combined the executives of the three Communities into a single institutional structure. However, with the merged executives, the commission and most departments were grouped together in Brussels, rather than Luxembourg City. The commission was first based on Avenue de la Joyeuse Entrée/Blijde Inkomstlaan, before moving to the Breydel building on the Schuman roundabout, and then its present location in the Berlaymont building. The ECSC secretariat moved from Luxembourg City to the merged body Council secretariat in the Ravenstein building of Brussels. In 1971 the council and its secretariat moved into the Charlemagne building, next to the commission's Berlaymont. These premises rapidly proved insufficient and the administrative branch of the secretariat moved to a building at 76 Rue Joseph II/Jozef II-straat. During the 1980s the language divisions moved out into the Nerviens, Frère Orban and Guimard buildings.

To compensate Luxembourg City for the loss of the Commission and Council, a number of provisions were laid out. Firstly, the Court of Justice would remain in the city. Some departments of the Commission and the Assembly, including the Secretariat of the Assembly would remain along with European Investment Bank (further, particularly financial, institutions would also be prioritised for Luxembourg City). The council would also have to hold sessions in Luxembourg City during April, June and October. It also confirmed Strasbourg as the seat of the Parliament. With the prioritisation of Luxembourg City for future institutions, in 1977 the Court of Auditors became provisionally located in Luxembourg City.

=== Edinburgh agreement ===
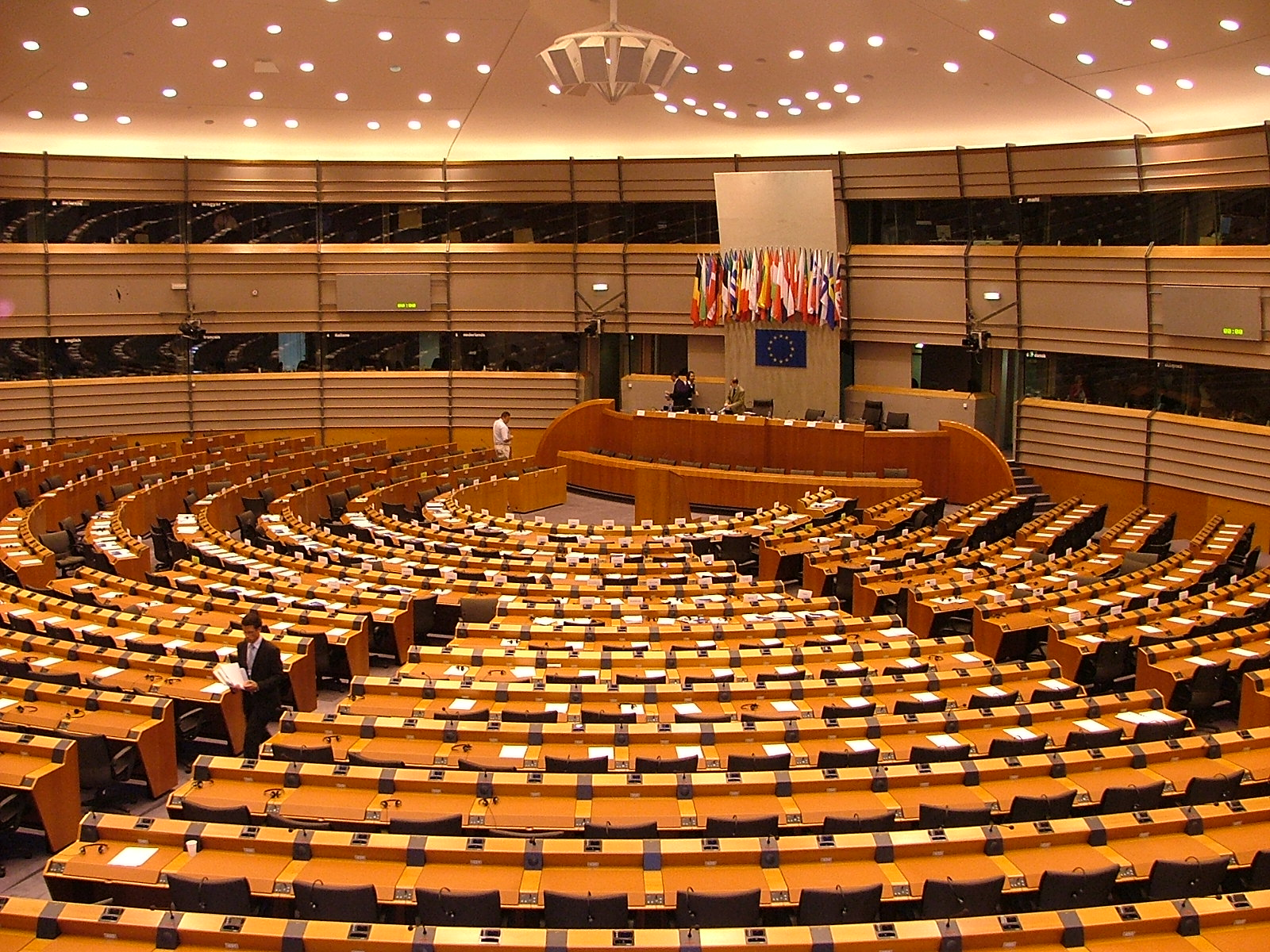
Parliament built a hemicycle in Brussels to be closer to the other institutions

Despite the 1965 agreement, the Parliament's seat remained a source of contention. Wishing to be closer to the activities in Brussels and Luxembourg City, a few plenary sessions were held by the Parliament between 1967 and 1981 in Luxembourg City instead of Strasbourg—against the wishes of France—and in 1981 it returned to holding sessions entirely in Strasbourg. In the previous year it unsuccessfully issued an ultimatum to the national governments, attempting to force them to reach an agreement. Thus, the Parliament moved some of its decision-making bodies to Brussels, along with its committee and political group meetings, and in 1985 it also built a plenary chamber in Brussels for some part-sessions. All the Parliament's attempts in this field were challenged by member states.

In response, the European Council adopted on 12 December 1992 in Edinburgh a final agreement on the seats. The Decision on the location of the seats of the institutions and of certain bodies and departments of the European Communities outlined that the Parliament would be based in Strasbourg, where it would be obliged to hold "twelve periods of monthly plenary sessions, including the budget session". However, additional sessions could be held in Brussels, which is where committees also should have met while the secretariat had to remain in Luxembourg City.

It also provided for the Court of First Instance (now known as the General Court) to be based in Luxembourg City with the Court of Justice, which remained there. However, this agreement dropped the provision from the 1965 decision, which gave priority to Luxembourg City for any new judicial and financial bodies. In response, Luxembourg attached a unilateral declaration stating it did not renounce this article. However they did renounce any claim to the seat of the judicial Boards of Appeal of the Office for Harmonisation in the Internal Market via the Treaty of Nice.

The Parliament challenged this decision splitting their working arrangements, declaring that the division of its activities between three states was against the treaties and the natural prerogatives of a Parliament elected by direct universal suffrage, claiming the right to decide its own workings to its own efficiency. In response, leaders annexed the decision to the Treaty of Amsterdam, including it in the treaties.

=== Central bank ===
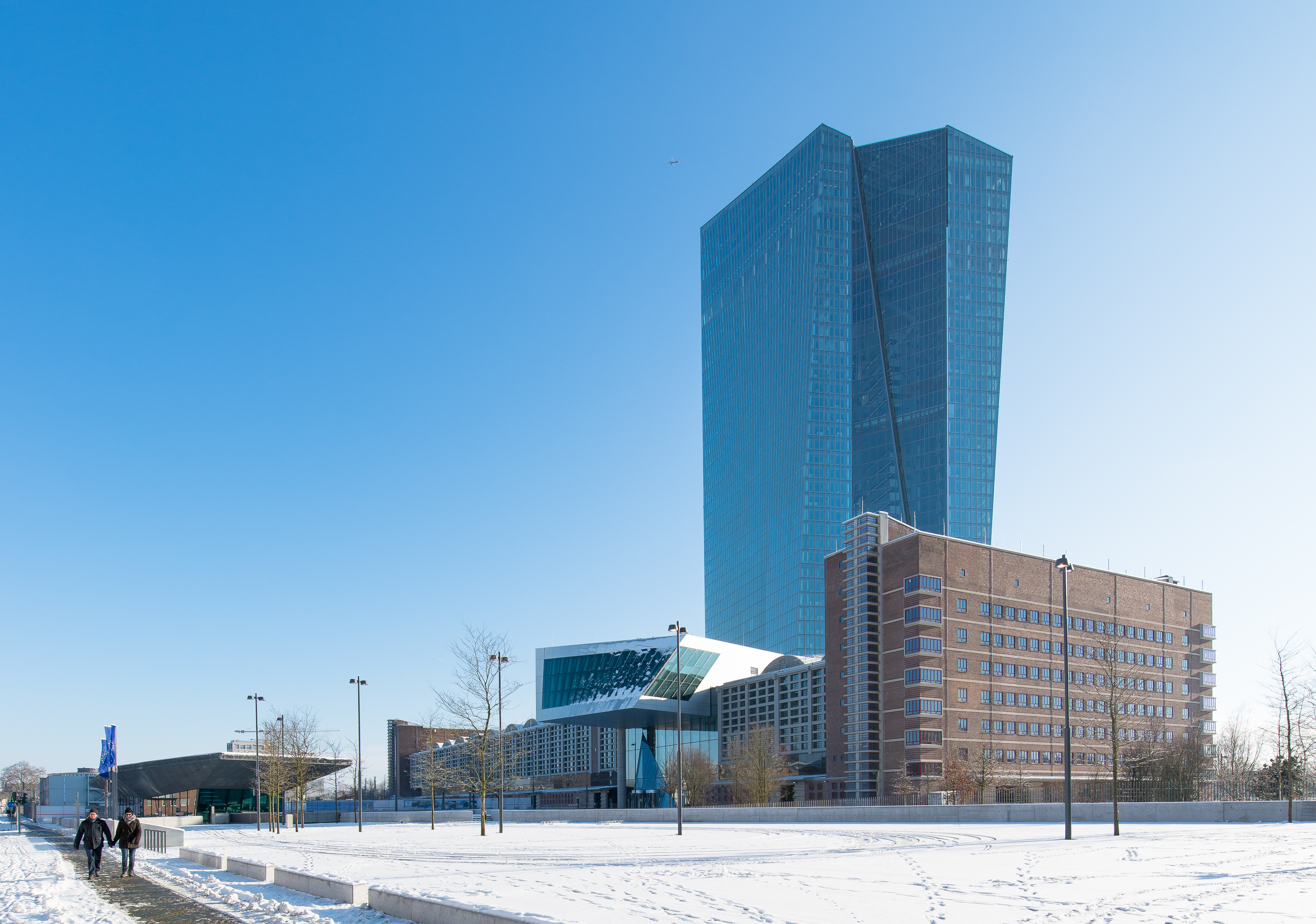
In 1993 it was decided that the central bank (shown) was to be seated in Frankfurt.

A Council decision on 29 October 1993 on the location of European agencies established that the European Monetary Institute, later the European Central Bank, would be based in Frankfurt. Frankfurt had to compete with numerous other cities, including London, Paris, Amsterdam, Luxembourg, Lyon, Barcelona and even Basel (in Switzerland, which is outside the European Union).

France even linked the issue of the seat to the ongoing dispute regarding the seat of the European Parliament. Frankfurt was criticised as symbolising German dominance, although the Deutsche Bundesbank had effectively been running the Communities currencies for the previous years, while Luxembourg City has a banking tradition that wasn't so careful. London was discredited because the UK remained outside the eurozone. It was also seen as important to locate the bank in a city not already hosting a national government or EU institution, in order to emphasise its independence. Others, such as the former head of the Bundesbank Karl Otto Pöhl, favoured a small country with a stable currency. The advantages of hosting the Bank were also in dispute by some economists. While there was seen by some as little to gain in terms of attracting other banks and financial institutions, others saw it as affecting which cities would be financial hubs in the years to come.

=== Recent history ===
In 1995, the Council of the European Union moved into the Justus Lipsius building in Brussels. However, with its staff increasing it continued to rent the Frère Orban building to house the Finnish and Swedish language divisions; later it started to rent further buildings in Brussels. In 2002, the European Council also began using the Justus Lipsius building as their Brussels venue, following an advanced implementation of a decision by European leaders during ratification of the Nice Treaty to do so at such a time as the total membership of the European Union surpassed 18 member states. Prior to this, the venue for European Council summits was in the member state that held the rotating Presidency of the Council of the European Union. In order to make room for additional meeting space a number of renovations were made, including the conversion of an underground carpark into additional press briefing rooms. However, in 2004 leaders decided the logistical problems created by the outdated facilities warranted the construction of a new purpose built seat able to cope with the nearly 6,000 meetings, working groups, and summits per year. This resulted in the Europa building, which opened its doors in 2017, and is now home to both the Council of the European Union and the European Council. Both institutions continue to use the adjacent Justus Lipsius building, linked by two skyways to the new construction, for low-level meetings and for use by the Council secretariat.

In 2004, following renovations to remove asbestos, the European Commission moved back into its headquarters in the Berlaymont building and the Barroso Commission concentrated its activities there, with the President and meeting room on the thirteenth floor. As of 2007, the Commission occupies 865,000 m^{2} in 61 buildings across the Brussels EU district, with staff increases owing to the enlargement of the EU prompting speculation of possible new building plans.

The European Parliament seat remained an issue throughout this period, despite the Council writing it into the treaties. During the 1990s, the issue was debated every year and in 1999, 250 MEPs signed a letter condemning the arrangement and the Strasbourg facilities. The following year Parliament voted 401 to 77 for a resolution demanding the right to decide its own working locations. Attempts to include this in the following treaties in 2000 and 2007 both failed. However, in September 2008 Parliament held its first full plenary session in Brussels after the ceiling of the Strasbourg chamber collapsed during recess forcing the temporary move.

The unique architecture of the European Commission's Berlaymont building is utilised in its official emblem. Likewise, the official emblem of the European Council and Council of the European Union features the Europa building's distinctive multi-storey "lantern"-shaped structure where meetings for both of these institutions take place.

== European Parliament ==
The Parliament is bound to spend "twelve periods of monthly plenary sessions, including the budget session" in Strasbourg, while additional sessions and committees are in Brussels. The secretariat is in Luxembourg City. While the split arrangements for other bodies have relatively little impact, the large number of members of the Parliament and its concentration of work load means that these issues are far more contentious than those surrounding the other institutions. A democratic question has also been raised in the European Parliament being one of the few parliaments in the world which cannot decide its own meeting place, and also being the only parliament to have more than one seat.

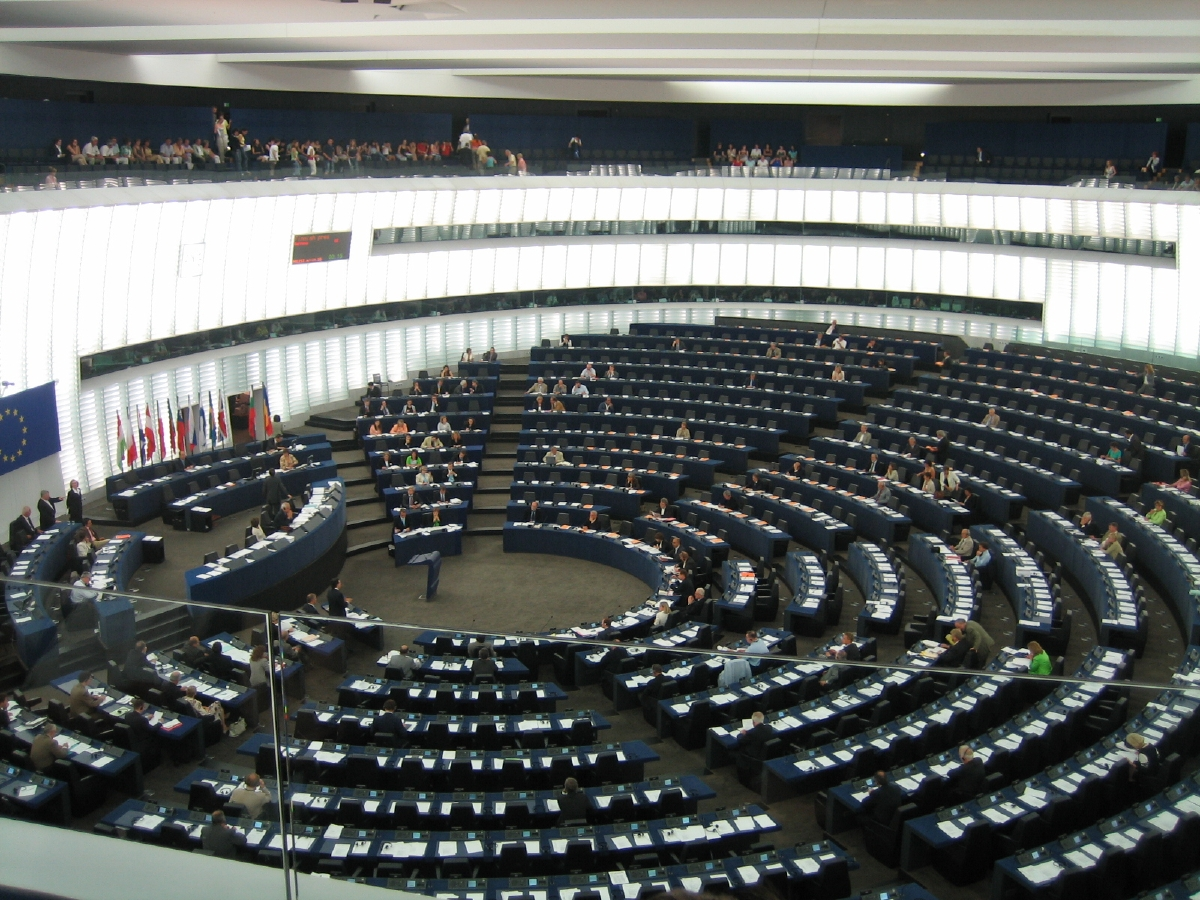
Parliament's trips between Brussels and Strasbourg (image) have been criticised on grounds of democracy, cost, environmental impact, and practicality.

Critics have described the three-city arrangement as a "travelling circus" with a cost an extra 200 million euro over a single location. Defenders of the Strasbourg seat, like the MEP for Germany Bernd Posselt, however claim that the figure is rather a mere 40 million euro, i.e. an extra cost of 8 cents per EU citizen. When Parliament was forced to meet in Brussels in September 2008, due to a fault in the Strasbourg building, it was estimated that Parliament saved between €3 and 4 million, though the exact figure is hard to calculate. As the commission also meets in Strasbourg when Parliament is out of Brussels, the cost of Commissioners moving amounted to €9.5 million between 2002 and 2007. The Green party has also noted the environmental cost in a study led by Jean Lambert, MEP and Caroline Lucas, MEP; in addition to the extra financial cost, there are over 20,268 tonnes of additional carbon dioxide, undermining any environmental stance of the institution and the Union. Jens-Peter Bonde, former leader of the ID group, stated in 2007 that unless the issue of the seat was tackled, it would be impossible to increase the election's turnout, as the movement of the seat was the issue raised by voters most often. He, along with Green co-leader Monica Frassoni, called for a debate on the issue, which was being blocked by President Hans-Gert Pöttering.

The trips between the cities are seen by the public as "a money-wasting junket hugely enjoyed by journalists, MEPs and researchers" when in fact it is "a money-wasting junket loathed by journalists, MEPs and researchers" according to Gary Titley, MEP (PES), who announced he would not be standing for re-election in 2009 because of the two-seat issue. Titley stated that he could "no longer tolerate the shifting of the Parliament lock, stock and barrel to Strasbourg one week a month...It's a miserable journey and it's always a problem", noting the problems in lost luggage. As well as undermining the EU's climate change objectives, he criticises the Strasbourg sessions as the deals have already been made leading to them becoming formal voting sessions padded out with "debates saying we are against sin." Titley also states that, because the journeys take so much time, the committees in Brussels who do the bulk of the work do not have sufficient time to work. Titley is not the only one to leave over the issue; Eluned Morgan MEP stood down in 2009 for similar reasons, notably due to the toll the moving had on time with her family, and former MEP Simon Murphy quit as leader of the Socialists in 2002 due to the inconvenience of the arrangement.

=== Brussels as a single workplace ===
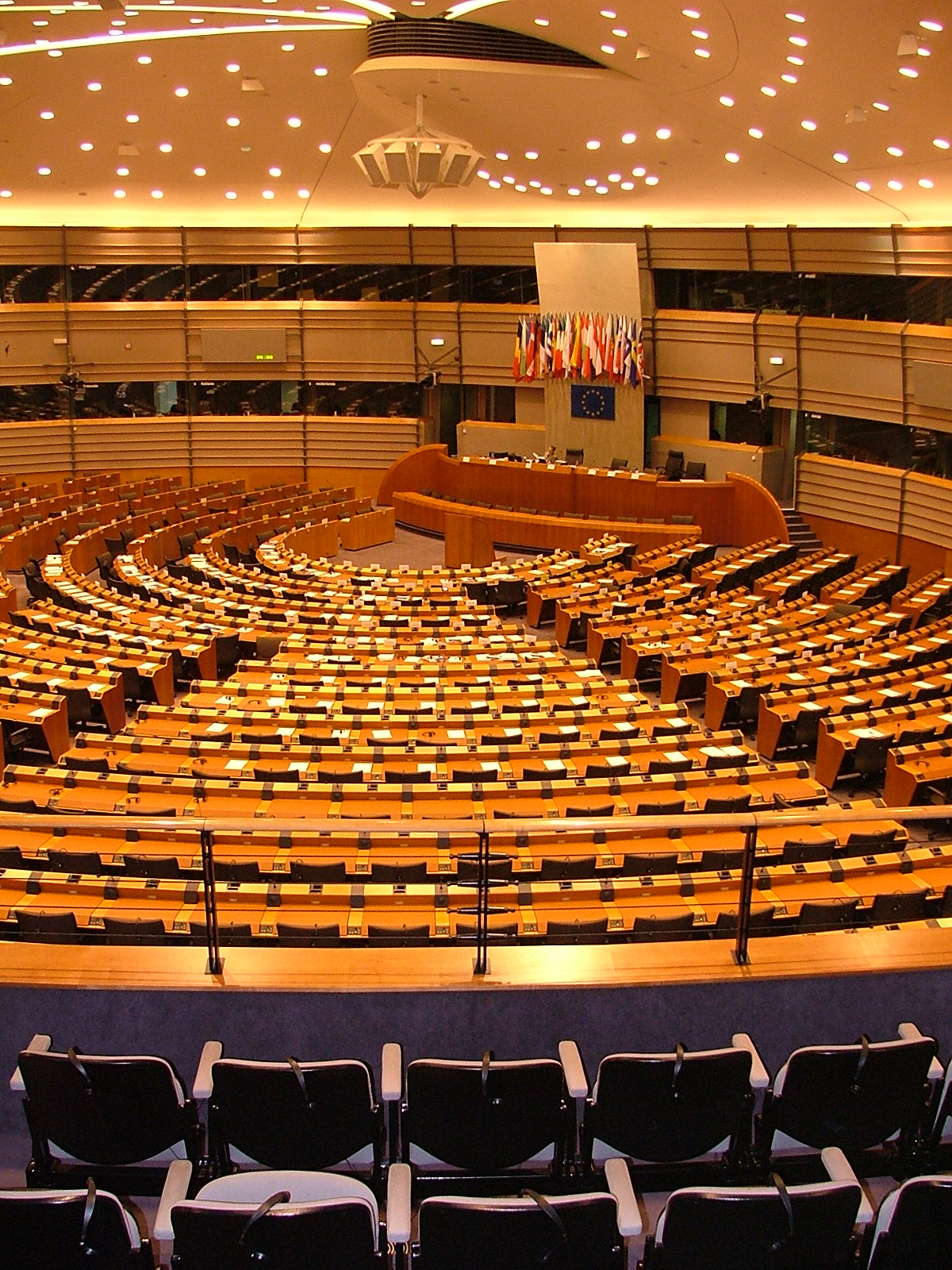
The parliamentary hemicycle of the Paul-Henri Spaak building in Brussels

Brussels is already the seat of the two other political institutions, the Commission and Council of Ministers (including the European Council). In addition, the Parliament has already geared three quarters of its activity in the city. Third-party organisations are also based in the city, including NGOs, trade unions, employers' organisations and the highest concentration of journalists in the world—also due to the presence of NATO in the city in addition to the large presence of Union institutions. While Strasbourg campaigners see being based in Strasbourg as an aid to independence of MEPs, Brussels' campaigners state it is merely reducing the institution's influence by "exiling" them away from the other major institutions.

Brussels also has better transport links than Strasbourg, with lower pay for civil servants which reduce costs. Some commentators further underline that night-life in Strasbourg is comparatively lacklustre and that MEPs who would wish to relax after a long and hard working day are not offered many opportunities to do so. The position of Strasbourg suffered a minor blow in 2006, when allegations surfaced over charges by the city of Strasbourg on buildings the Parliament was renting. The controversy died down when the European Parliament decided to officially buy the buildings on 24 October 2006.

In May 2006, an online petition, oneseat.eu, was started by MEP Cecilia Malmström calling for a single seat of Parliament, to be based in Brussels. By September of that year it reached its aim of one million signatures, and according to a provision in the European Constitution a petition signed by a million citizens should be considered by the commission. The overall validity of the petition was called into doubt, however, due to it being on the Internet and using e-mail addresses instead of street addresses. In addition, the majority of signatories were concentrated in northern Europe, notably the Netherlands (40%). Regardless, the petition is seen by pro-Brussels groups as an important symbol. One signatory to the petition was Commission Vice President Margot Wallström; she supported the campaign, stating that "something that was once a very positive symbol of the EU reuniting France and Germany has now become a negative symbol—of wasting money, bureaucracy and the insanity of the Brussels institutions".

In early 2011, the Parliament voted to scrap one of the Strasbourg sessions by holding two within a single week. and the Dutch government joined the calls to scrap the seat altogether. The mayor of Strasbourg officially reacted by stating "we will counter-attack by upturning the adversary's strength to our own profit, as a judoka would do" and announced that his town would press forward for a complete relocation of all parliamentary related services of the EU to Strasbourg.

In August 2012, cracks were found in the beams supporting the ceiling of the Brussels hemicycle, leading to a closure of at least 6 months of the entire A section of the Paul Henri Spaak Building according to an estimate released on 9 October 2012 by the Parliament administration. In early December 2012, it became known that the damage was more serious than previously thought, and that the closure of the hemicycle was expected to last "until November 2013". All "mini plenary" meetings in Brussels until this date were cancelled. Since, as of December 2012, the European Parliament is "having trouble" finding a company to carry out the repair work, it is likely that the reopening of the Brussels hemicycle may take place only in 2014.

=== Strasbourg as a single workplace ===
Some campaigners wish to see the concentration of the Parliament's activities back in Strasbourg (one being a campaign called the "Association for European Democracy" launched on 15 March 2007). This is seen to be symbolic of decentralisation of the EU away from Brussels. Emma Nicholson, the only British MEP to support Strasbourg, argues that being next door to the Council of Europe allows MEPs to keep in touch with delegates from the rest of Europe, such as Russia, and that being in Brussels isolates the EU from such influences. Pro-Strasbourg campaigners also argue that Strasbourg offers more independence for Parliament, away from the other institutions and lobby groups in Brussels.

If the Parliament were wholly in Strasbourg, then the news media would also no longer be able to use shortcuts such as "Brussels decided..." rather than discuss the detail of the decision markers. Media would also have to be based in Strasbourg and hence might provide better coverage of the Council of Europe. Strasbourg is also preferred for historical reasons, having changed hands between France and Germany four times between 1870 and 1945. It is also argued that Brussels is no longer a good symbol for European unity given the recent political disputes in Belgium.

This position was supported by President Josep Borrell Fontelles, although he earned some criticism when he stated that the importance of Strasbourg in the context of the Second World War could not be perceived in the same way as France and Germany by "Nordic countries" (a reference to the Swedish MEP who started the one-seat petition). French MEP Brigitte Foure started a pro-Strasbourg petition, one-city.eu, in 2008 (countering the Brussels petition) which has gained just over 7,190 signatures as of October 2012.

Following the announcement (on 21 October 2010) of the setting up of an "informal seat study group" by British MEP Edward McMillan-Scott (Liberal Democrats), which was seen as an attack on Strasbourg by the municipality, Roland Ries and Catherine Trautmann released (on 29 October 2010) an energetic joint declaration of defense. On 9 November 2010, the municipal council of Strasbourg green-lighted a project (envisioned since April of the same year) of the creation of a "Place for Europe" (lieu d′Europe) – a walk-in centre for people curious about the European institutions in Strasbourg – in the former Villa Kaysersguet, an architecturally precious but currently (2010) derelict 18th-century mansion neighbouring with the European Court of Human Rights and the Agora building of the Council of Europe.

=== Opinion and actions ===
A poll of MEP in June 2007 by MEP Alexander Nuno Alvaro, a pro-Brussels campaigner, found that 89% wanted a single seat and that 81% preferred Brussels. However, despite polling all MEPs, only 39% responded to the questions. Alvaro stated that, after consulting polling firms, this was a high turnout for an opinion poll even if not totally representative. A Parliamentary magazine was pressured to drop the publication of this poll initially, reflecting the sensitive nature of the issue. In the same month, another survey by Simon Hix of the University of Manchester and Roger Scully from the University of Aberystwyth found a 68% support for a single seat. In their survey 272 of the 732 people questioned responded. Following each sitting in Strasbourg, hundreds of MEPs sign a petition calling for a reduction of time in Strasbourg, though Pascal Mangin, Strasboug's deputy mayor, does not believe the opinion of the MEPs to be important. Nevertheless, in January 2009 a Parliamentary written declaration calling for one Brussels seat failed to get sufficient support. It gained 286 signatures out of 393 needed for it to be considered. Brussels campaigners cited that it was bad timing, with French and German leaders of Parliament and the main two groups ordering their members not to support the motion. The campaigners vowed to continue the fight while the Mayor of Strasbourg Roland Ries this time welcomed the "wisdom of the parliamentarians" and said it signalled their desire for Strasbourg to host the institution alone.

A survey of citizens' attitudes conducted in May 2006 included two questions on the issue of the Parliament's seat. On average, 32% people from all member states supported the two-location policy while 68 were against. Support for one location was higher among men than women, and among people over 35 than under. Support for both locations was one percentage point lower in the 10 countries which joined in 2004 than in the 15 earlier members; No group have more than 40 percent support to two locations. Of those against two seats, 76% supported Brussels and 24% supported Strasbourg. In this case support for Brussels was 6 percentage points higher in the 10 new members with women and the under 35 year-olds. The group with the highest support for Strasbourg was the over 35-year-olds with 28 percent support. The citizens of Strasbourg are of course strong supporters of the Parliament being based in Strasbourg with each session being worth four million euro to the city's economy. In September 2008, Strasbourg's government passed a motion demanding all of Parliament's activities be relocated to the city.

These polls have not affected the position of France, which can veto any such move, with French President Nicolas Sarkozy stating that its seat is "non-negotiable". Despite that, the government has stated that the issue might be addressed if France were to be offered something of equal value. The Council itself has indicated privately that it would discuss the Strasbourg seat only if Parliament gives them a signal to start a debate, as they would not do on their own initiative. However, few wish to discuss the issue while the current constitutional issues are still present. Although political parties have no formal position, the Greens, Liberals and Socialists are all outspoken on having Brussels as a permanent seat. In 2020, Irish MEP Clare Daly told The Parliament Magazine that the coronavirus pandemic highlighted the unnecessary nature of travelling to Strasbourg for plenary, and called for the seat's abolition as part of the EU's economic recovery plans

=== Alternative role for Strasbourg ===
In January 2003, Green-EFA co-leader Daniel Cohn-Bendit proposed turning the Strasbourg seat into a "European university". Elaborating on this in 2008, he sees such a university teaching all subjects and funded directly by the EU with between 15,000 and 20,000 students. The same idea has been put forward in January 2006 by Polish minister and former dissident Bronisław Geremek, in an article originally published by Le Monde. In an open letter to Cohn-Bendit, Roland Ries, the mayor of Strasbourg, reminded him that the international attractiveness of the University of Strasbourg was related to the presence of European institutions in Strasbourg and that it would not be enhanced, but undermined, by the replacement of one of the largest of these institutions by just another, and much smaller, university.

The year before, the proposed European Institute of Technology had been touted as the university to take over the building. It has been proposed that the Institute could also be merged with European Research Council and based there. The vice-chancellors of Strasbourg's three universities have suggested merging to create a 'European University'. It has also been suggested that Strasbourg could host the European Council meetings, minor institutions such as the Committee of the Regions, or the institutions of the proposed Mediterranean Union. The Green Party has proposed having Strasbourg as the home of a new "European Senate".

Following the United Kingdom's decision to leave the EU, it has been suggested by senior MEPs that the European Medicines Agency (EMA) and European Banking Authority (EBA), then based in London, could relocate to France in exchange for the scrapping of the Strasbourg seat. The EMA would utilise the parliament's former complex of buildings. Other plans mooted, following the election of French President Macron, include converting it into a parliament for use by the Eurozone. The EMA relocated to Amsterdam and the EBA relocated to Paris, but this did not affect the Strasbourg seat.

== See also ==
- Brussels and the European Union
- Court of Justice of the European Union
- European Parliament in Luxembourg
- Eurotower
- Seat of the European Central Bank
