= Anthony Teasdale =

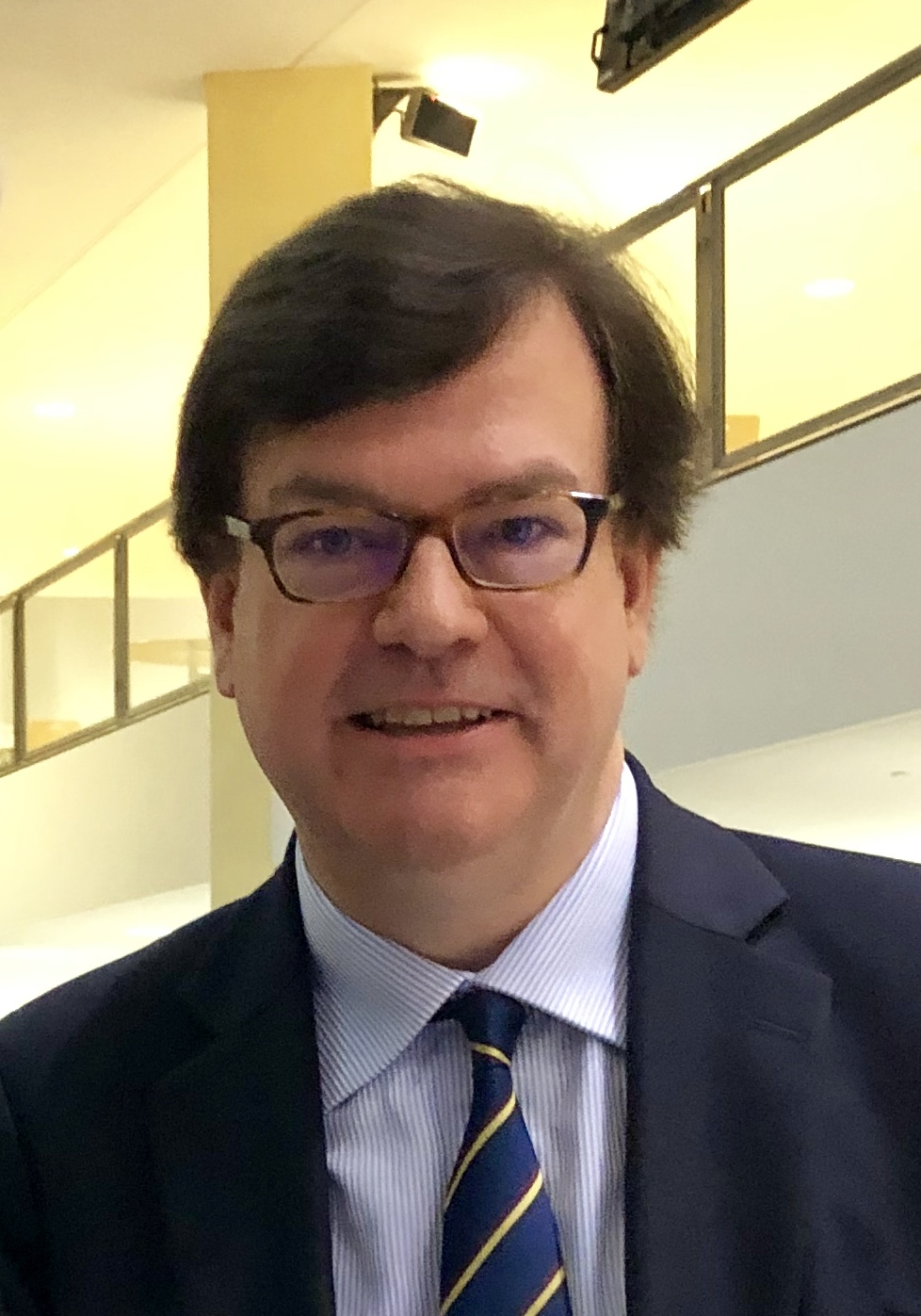
Anthony Teasdale photographed in June 2019

Anthony Teasdale, FAcSS, is a visiting professor in Practice at the European Institute of the London School of Economics (LSE) and an adjunct professor at the School of International and Public Affairs (SIPA) at Columbia University in New York. He was previously the founding Director General of the European Parliamentary Research Service (EPRS) - otherwise known as the Directorate-General for Parliamentary Research Services (DG EPRS) - in the permanent administration of the European Parliament, a role he performed from 2013 to 2022. (The 300-strong EPRS serves members and committees as the in-house research centre and think tank of the European Parliament). Teasdale has also worked as a Special Adviser at the Foreign and Commonwealth Office and HM Treasury in Whitehall, and is co-author of The Penguin Companion to European Union (fourth edition, 880 pages, 2012).

== Education ==
Anthony Teasdale studied at Balliol and Nuffield Colleges at Oxford University, where he earned first-class honours (BA) in PPE (Philosophy, Politics and Economics) and a Master of Philosophy (M.Phil.) in Politics. He has also been a Research Fellow of Nuffield College and Lecturer in Politics at Magdalen College and Corpus Christi College, Oxford.

== Career ==
From February 1988 to November 1990, Anthony Teasdale was Special Adviser to Sir Geoffrey Howe, British Foreign Secretary and Deputy Prime Minister, witnessing the last three years of the government of Margaret Thatcher. He worked closely with Howe in writing his resignation speech in November 1990, leading to Mrs Thatcher's own resignation nine days later. He was also Special Adviser to Kenneth Clarke as Chancellor of the Exchequer in 1996–97. Later, Teasdale served as head of policy strategy and legislative planning for the centre-right EPP Group in the European Parliament, and as deputy chief of staff to Jerzy Buzek MEP, the former Prime Minister of Poland when the latter was President of the European Parliament from 2009 to 2012.

== Publications ==
In addition to co-authoring (with Timothy Bainbridge) The Penguin Companion to European Union (see above), Anthony Teasdale has written articles on European and US politics in several academic journals, including Political Quarterly, Government and Opposition, Electoral Studies and the Journal of Common Market Studies. His most recent publications have been a 100-page afterword - entitled 'The Making and Breaking of post-Wall Europe, 1985 to 2023' - to the new edition of Jean-Baptiste Duroselle's book, Europe: The History of a Continent (Michael Joseph / Penguin, 2023), as well as an LSE monograph on the European policy of French President Charles de Gaulle and an article with David Willetts on Mrs Thatcher's Bruges speech in Prospect magazine.

== Honours ==
Anthony Teasdale was elected a Fellow of the Academy of Social Sciences (FAcSS) in the United Kingdom in 2016.
