= Secretariat of the European Parliament =

Administrative body of the European Parliament

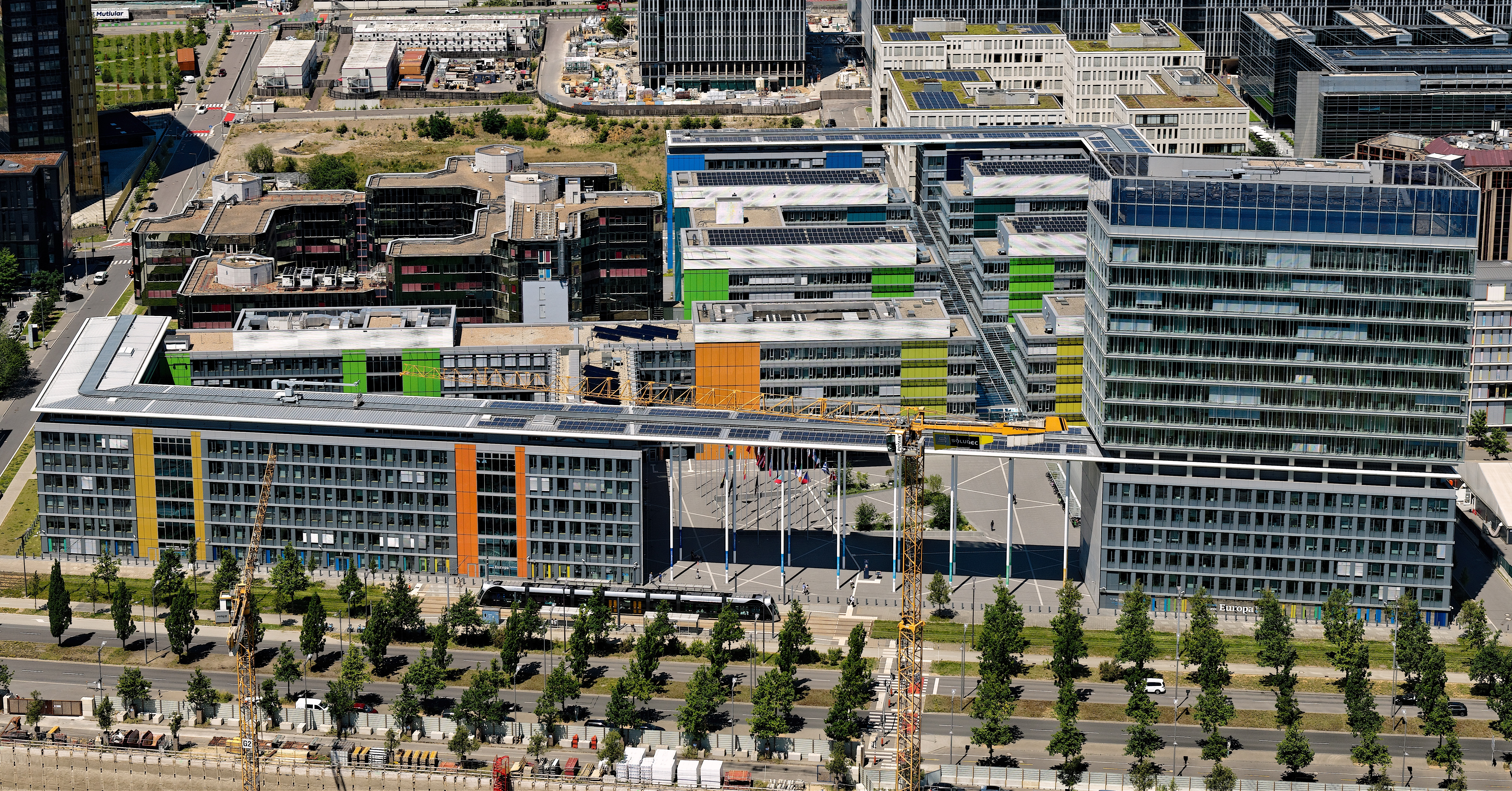

Agency overview
- Formed: 1958; 68 years ago
- Jurisdiction: European Parliament
- Headquarters: Konrad Adenauer building, Luxembourg City, Luxembourg
- Agency executive: (Italy) Alessandro Chiocchetti, Secretary General of the European Parliament
- Website: www.europarl.europa.eu

The Secretariat of the European Parliament is the administrative body of the European Parliament headed by a Secretary-General. It is based in the Kirchberg quarter of Luxembourg City and around Brussels-Luxembourg railway station in Brussels and employs around 4,000 officials.

== Secretary-General ==
The Secretary General of the European Parliament is appointed by the Bureau of the Parliament. The post is responsible for administration and assisting the President, MEPs and the Parliament's bodies. They also deal with the day-to-day running of business and prepare basic reports for budget estimates. The Secretary-General also has to sign, together with the President, all acts adopted by the Parliament and Council.

The Secretaries-General to date have been;

- (Netherlands) Frits de Nerée tot Babberich (1958–1963)
- (Netherlands) Hans Nord (1963–1979)
- (West Germany) Hans Joachim Opitz (1979–1986)
- (Italy) Enrico Vinci (1986–1997)
- (United Kingdom) Julian Priestley (1997–2007)
- (Denmark) Harald Rømer (2007–2009)
- (Germany) Klaus Welle (2009–2022)
- (Italy) Alessandro Chiocchetti (2023–present)

== Legal Service ==
The Parliament's legal services advises members and bodies on matters of European law, helping in drafting of legislation and representing the Parliament in Courts.

== Directorates-General ==
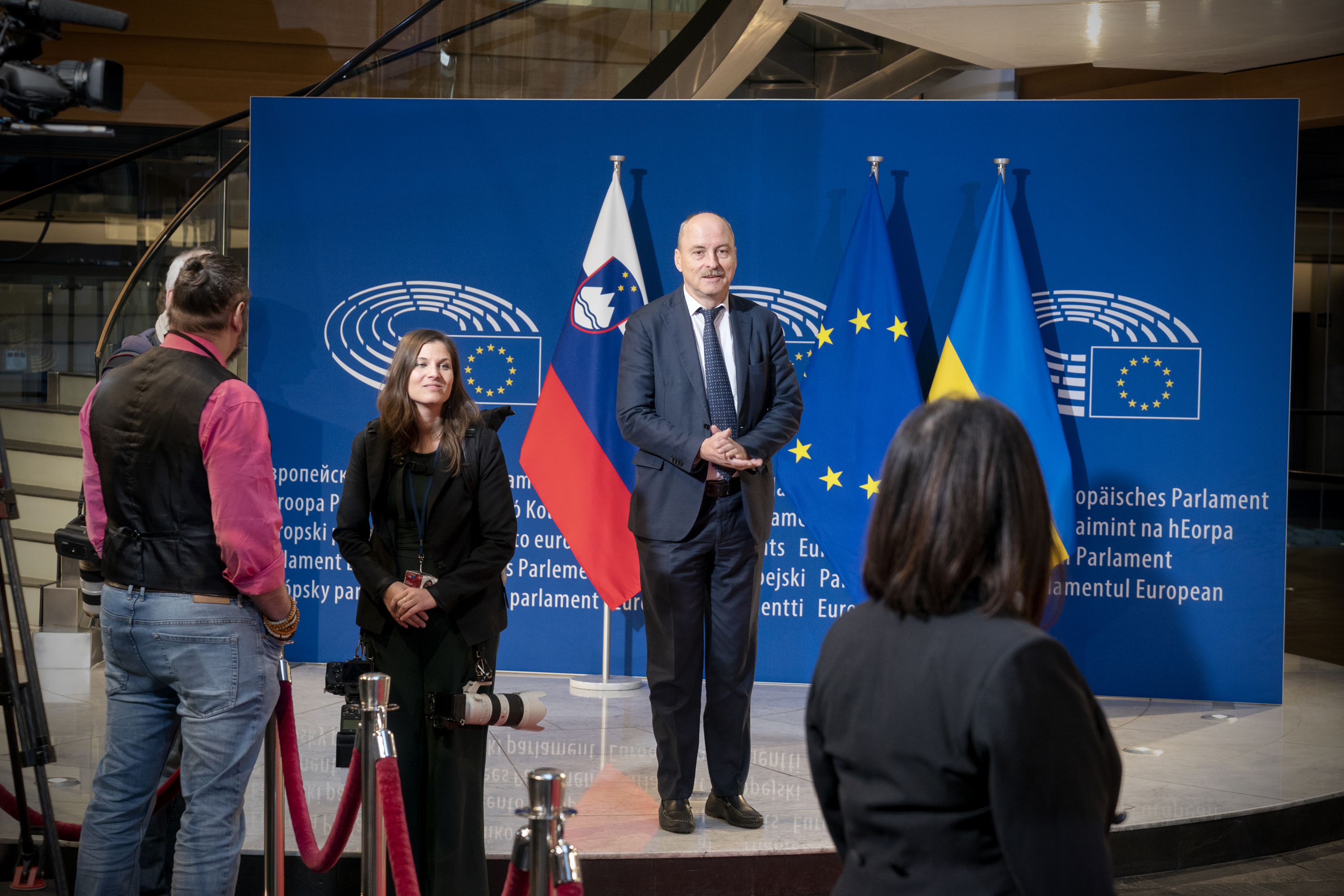
Secretary-General Klaus Welle in 2022

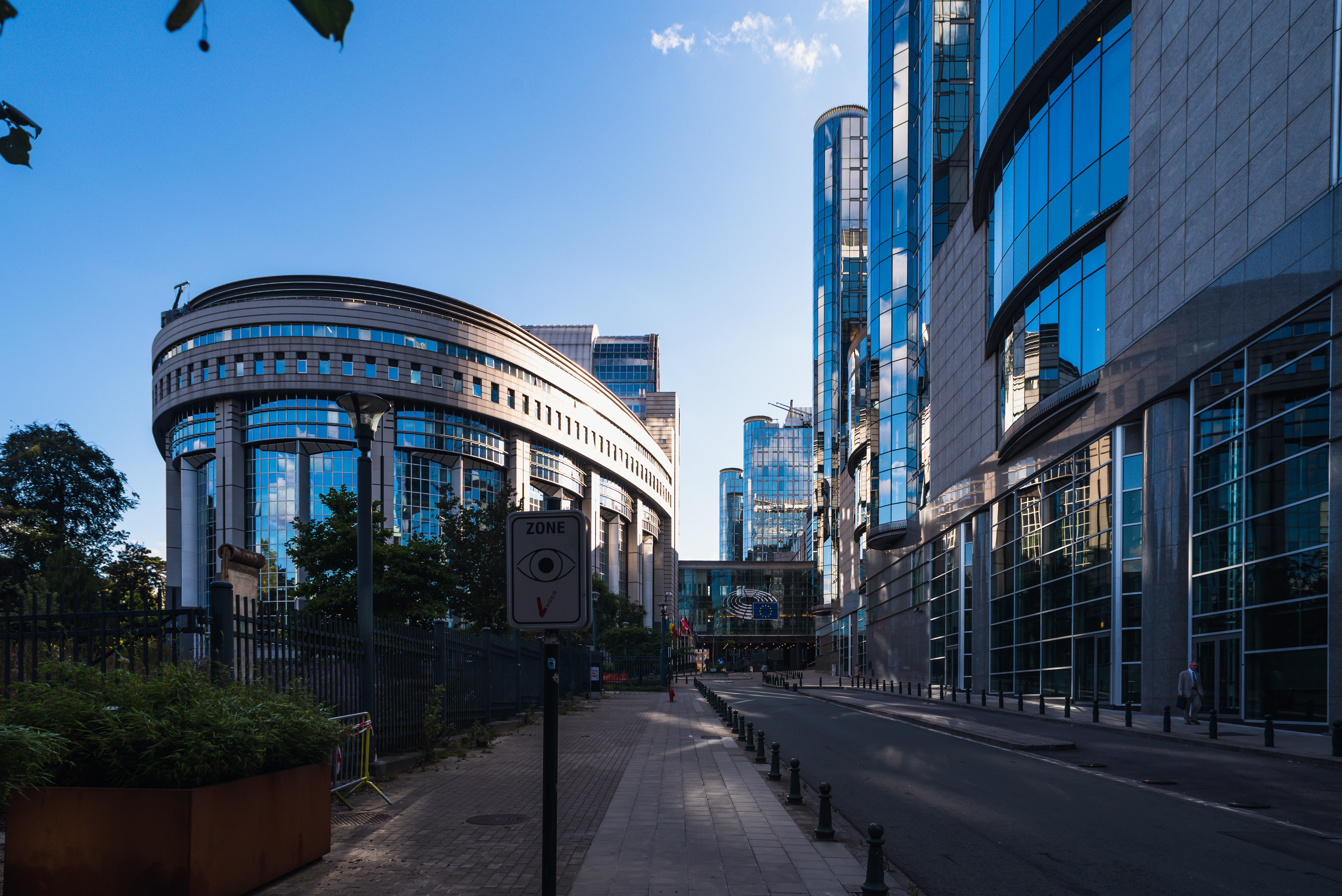
Paul-Henri Spaak building in Brussels

=== Presidency ===
The Directorate-General for the Presidency (DG PRES) organises plenary sittings and for follow-up activities including protocol, mail, register, archives and security.

=== Internal Policies ===
The Directorate-General for Internal Policies (DG IPOL) deals with assisting the work of Parliament's committees and their chairmen as well as coordinating relations and cooperation with the other institutions and national parliaments. The DG also supplies expert information and research to the members and committees. This is the task of the Policy Departments who produce studies, upon request, on topics for the members. One specific policy department is STOA the Science and Technology Options Assessment unit which advises committees and members on such topics.

=== External Policies ===
The Directorate-General for External Policies (DG EXPO) deals with assisting the work of Parliament's delegations, committees and their chairmen as well as coordinating relations and cooperation with the other institutions, national parliaments and foreign bodies. It also forms half of the co-secretariat of the ACP-EU Joint Parliamentary Assembly, the Euro-Mediterranean Parliamentary Assembly, the Eurolat and the European Eastern neighbours parliamentary assembly secretariat. The DG organises both delegation visits to non EU states and visits to the parliament by external state delegations. The DG also supplies expert information and research to the members and committees on topics relating to external countries. This is the task of the Policy Department who produce studies, upon request, on topics for the members. These studies, being produced by or for the European Parliament, are published on the Europarl website.

=== European Parliamentary Research Service ===
The European Parliamentary Research Service (DG EPRS) is the European Parliament's in-house research department and think tank. Its mission is to assist Members of the European Parliament in their parliamentary work by providing them with independent, objective and authoritative analysis of, and research on, policy issues relating to the European Union. It is also designed to increase Members' and EP committees' capacity to scrutinise and oversee the European Commission and other EU executive bodies.

=== Communication ===
The Directorate-General for Communication (DG COMM) deals with public information and media. Its staff includes the spokesperson of the Parliament, the press service and a network of public information offices across member states. It also manages the Europarl website.

=== Personnel ===
The Directorate-General for Personnel (DG PERS) deals with the human resources of the other DGs, including giving staff access to vocational training.

=== Infrastructure and Logistics ===
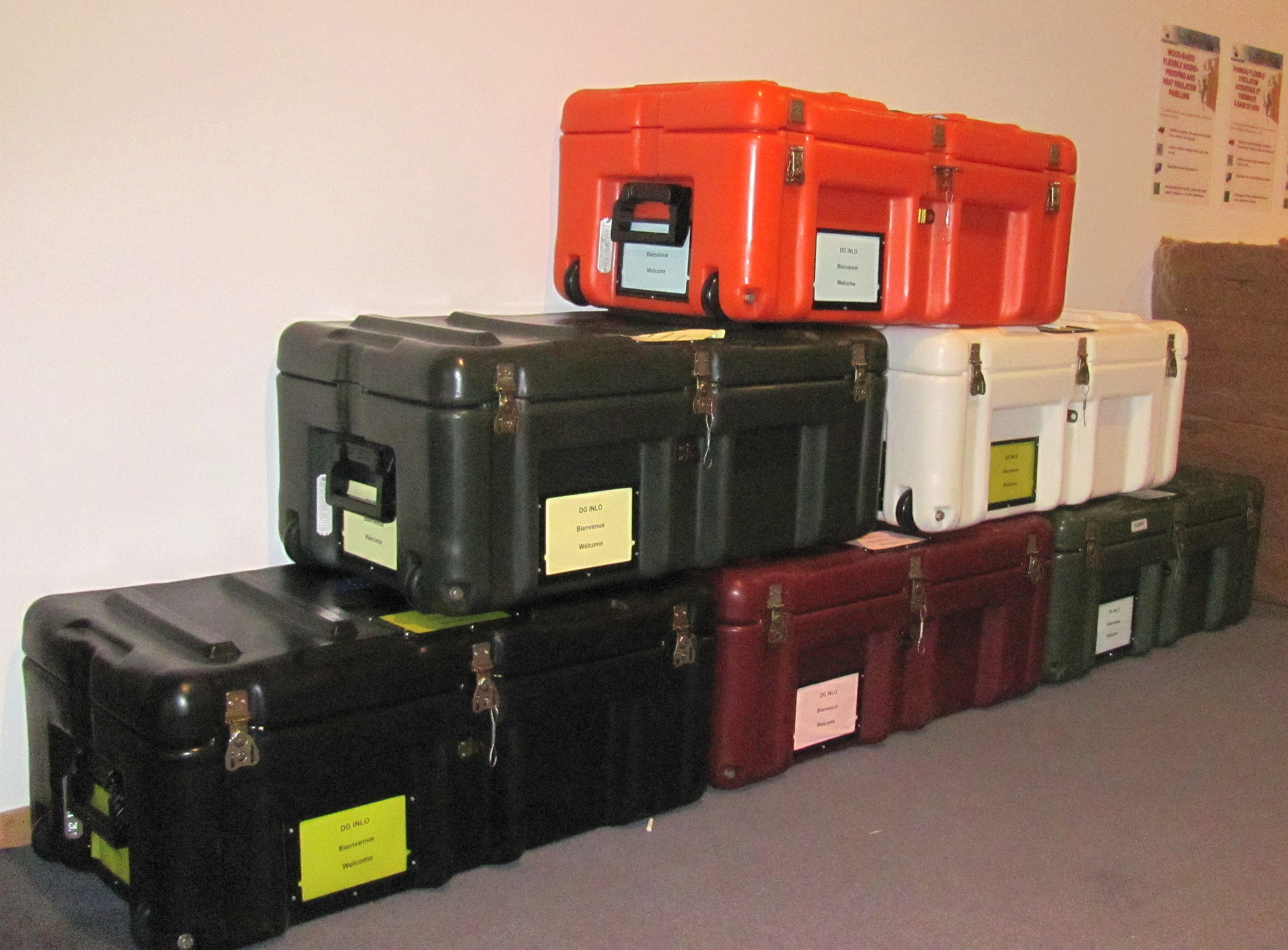
"Relocation boxes" of the European Parliament, called "cantines", are ready to be transported from Brussels to Strasbourg where a plenary session will take place. Each month, the EP moves back and forth to meet the EU obligation to hold meetings also in France.

The Directorate-General for Infrastructure and Logistics (DG INLO) manages the buildings of the European Parliament (spread over Strasbourg, Brussels and Luxembourg) and its member-state offices and equipment.

=== Translation ===
The Directorate-General for Translation (DG TRAD) is responsible for written translation of the Parliament's documents.

=== Interpretation and Conferences ===
The Directorate-General for Logistics and Interpretation for Conferences (DG LINC) manages meeting rooms and interpretation for all meetings organised by the Institution.

=== Finance ===
The Directorate-General for Finance (DG FINS) deals with the Parliaments budgetary and financial affairs. Preparing and checking the budget and monitoring its subsequent implementation. It is also responsible for official accounting and treasury operations as well as MEPs' finances.

=== Information Technologies and Cybersecurity ===
The Directorate-General for Information Technologies and Cybersecurity (DG ITEC) consists of five Directorates: Customers and Digital Workplace Directorate (CARE), Cybersecurity and IT Governance (GOV), Business Solutions (BUSOL), Infrastructure and Security Operations (INSO), Sourcing and Organisational Management (SOMA).

=== Security ===
The Directorate-General for Security (DG SAFE) works to facilitate Parliament activities, while guaranteeing sufficient protection to people, assets and information and consists of Directorate A: Proximity and Assistance Security and Safety (PASS), Directorate B: Fire, First aid and Prevention and Directorate C: Strategy and Resources.

== Staff ==
As of August 2017

Office	Abbreviation	Post	Name	Source
Office of the Secretary-General		Secretary-General of the European Parliament	Alessandro Chiocchetti	
Legal Service		Jurisconsult of the European Parliament	Freddy Drexler	
Directorate-General for the Presidency	DG PRES	Deputy Secretary-General of the European Parliament Director-General	Markus Winkler	
Directorate-General for External Policies of the Union	DG EXPO	Director-General	Pietro Ducci	
Directorate-General for Parliamentary Research Services	DG EPRS	Director-General	Anders Rasmussen	
Directorate-General for Communication	DG COMM	Director-General	Christian Mangold	
Directorate-General for Personnel	DG PERS	Director-General	Ellen Robson	
Directorate-General for Infrastructure and Logistics	DG INLO	Director-General	Anna Grzybowska	
Directorate-General for Translation and Clear Language	DG TRAD	Director-General	Valter Mavrič	
Directorate-General for Logistics and Interpretation for Conferences	DG LINC	Director-General	Juan Carlos Jiménez Marín	
Directorate-General for Finance	DG FINS	Director-General	Didier Klethi	
Directorate-General for Information Technologies and Cybersecurity	DG ITEC	Director-General	Lorenzo Mannelli	
Directorate-General for Security and Safety	DG SAFE	Director-General	Guy Mols	

== See also ==
- Directorates-General (of the Commission)
- European Parliament in Luxembourg
- Institutions of the European Union
- Location of European Union institutions
