= Vivien A. Schmidt =

American academic

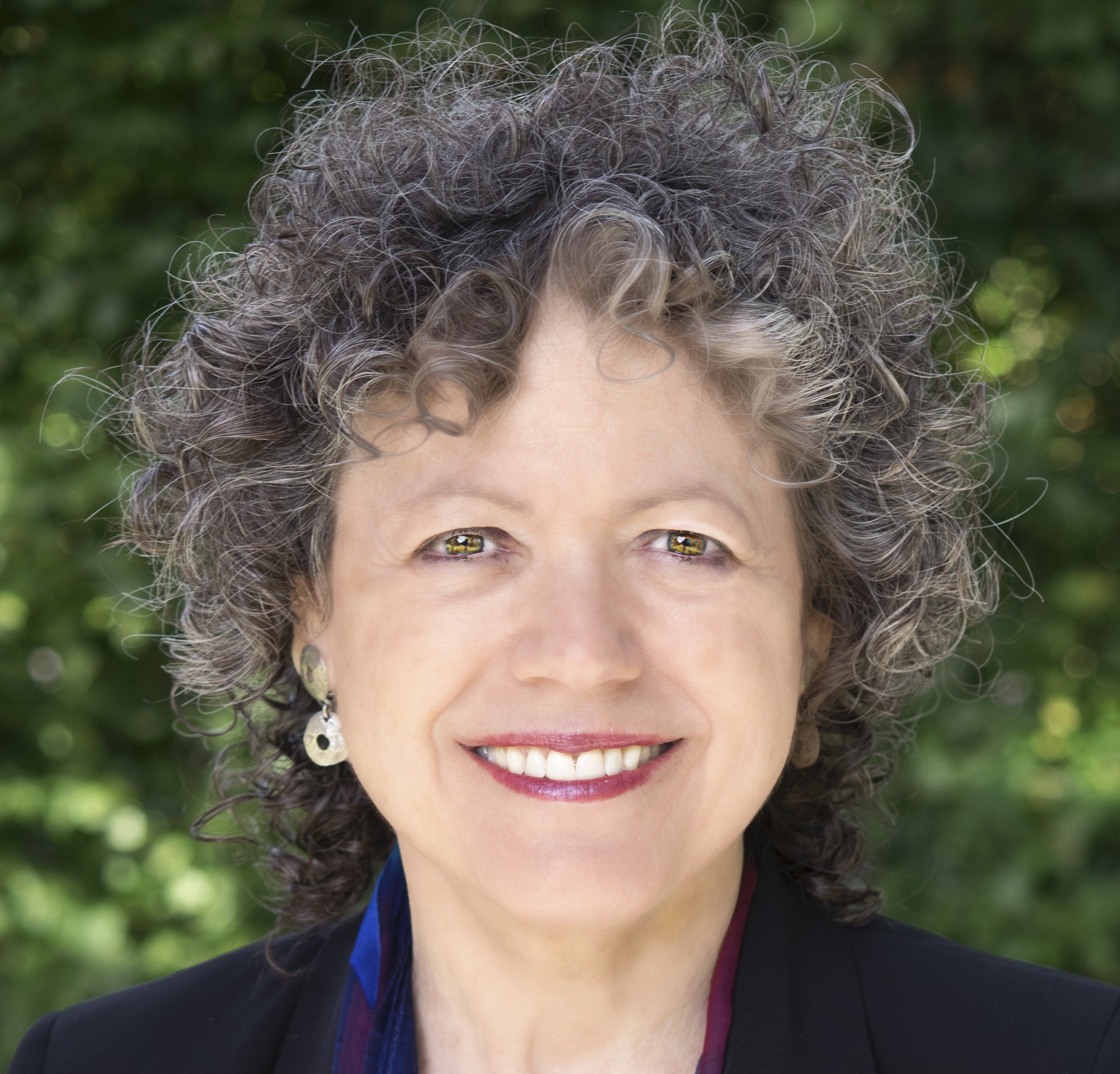
- Born: Vivien Ann Schmidt; 1949 (age 76–77)
- Occupations: Professor of International Relations and Political Science
- Organization: Boston University
- Website: Official website

Vivien A. Schmidt (born 1949) is an American academic of political science and international relations. At Boston University, she is the Jean Monnet Chair of European Integration Professor of International Relations in the Pardee School of Global Studies, and Professor of Political Science. She is known for her work on political economy, policy analysis, democratic theory, and new institutionalism. She is a 2018 recipient of a Guggenheim Fellowship and has been named a Chevalier in the French Legion of Honor.

== Biography ==
Schmidt received her Bachelor of Arts from Bryn Mawr College, and both her Masters and PhD from the University of Chicago. She also attended Sciences Po in Paris.

She taught at the University of Massachusetts Boston, has been a visiting professor at LUISS Guido Carli University in Rome, the Sciences Po in Paris, the University of Massachusetts Amherst, the Institute for Advanced Studies in Vienna, European University Institute in Florence, Max Planck Institute in Cologne, the University of Paris and Lille, and is visiting scholar at Nuffield College, Oxford University and at Harvard University, where she is an affiliate of the Center for European Studies. She headed the European Union Studies Association in the United States. She was the founding Director of the Center for the Study of Europe at the Pardee School of Global Studies at Boston University.

In 2018 Schmidt received a Guggenheim Fellowship for a book project on “The Rhetoric of Discontent: A Transatlantic Inquiry into the West’s Crisis of Democratic Capitalism” and was named by the President of the French Republic as a Chevalier in the Legion of Honor. In 2017 she was awarded the Society of Women in International Political Economy (SWIPE) Award for mentoring women in international relations. Other awards include an honorary doctorate from the Free University of Brussels (ULB), the Belgian Franqui Inter university Chair for foreign scholars, a Rockefeller Bellagio Center Residency, and Fulbright Fellowships to France and the UK. She is past head of the European Union Studies Association and sits on numerous editorial and advisory boards, including the Wissenschaftszentrum Berlin, the Brussels Foundation for European Progressive Studies, the Vienna Institute for Peace, and the Sheffield Political Economy Research Institute.

Schmidt's scholarly research encompasses political theory, comparative politics, and international relations. Her comparative work focuses on the changing nature of European politics and economics in a globalizing world, her theoretical work on the role of ideas and discourse in the dynamics of change. Schmidt is the author or editor of over a dozen books, including: Democracy in Europe (Oxford 2006), named in 2015 by the European Parliament as one of the ‘100 Books on Europe to Remember;’ Resilient Liberalism in Europe's Political Economy (co-edited, Cambridge 2013); The Futures of European Capitalism; Democratizing France. Her forthcoming book is entitled: Europe's Crisis of Legitimacy: Governing by Rules and Ruling by Numbers in the Eurozone (Oxford 2019) Her epistemological work on “discursive institutionalism,” which explores the ideational and discursive processes in comparative politics, has informed her books as well as articles published in the Annual Review of Political Science, the European Political Science Review, and other journals.

Schmidt is also an accomplished fine art photographer who has exhibited widely. (See her photo website at http://www.vivienschmidt.com)

== Research ==
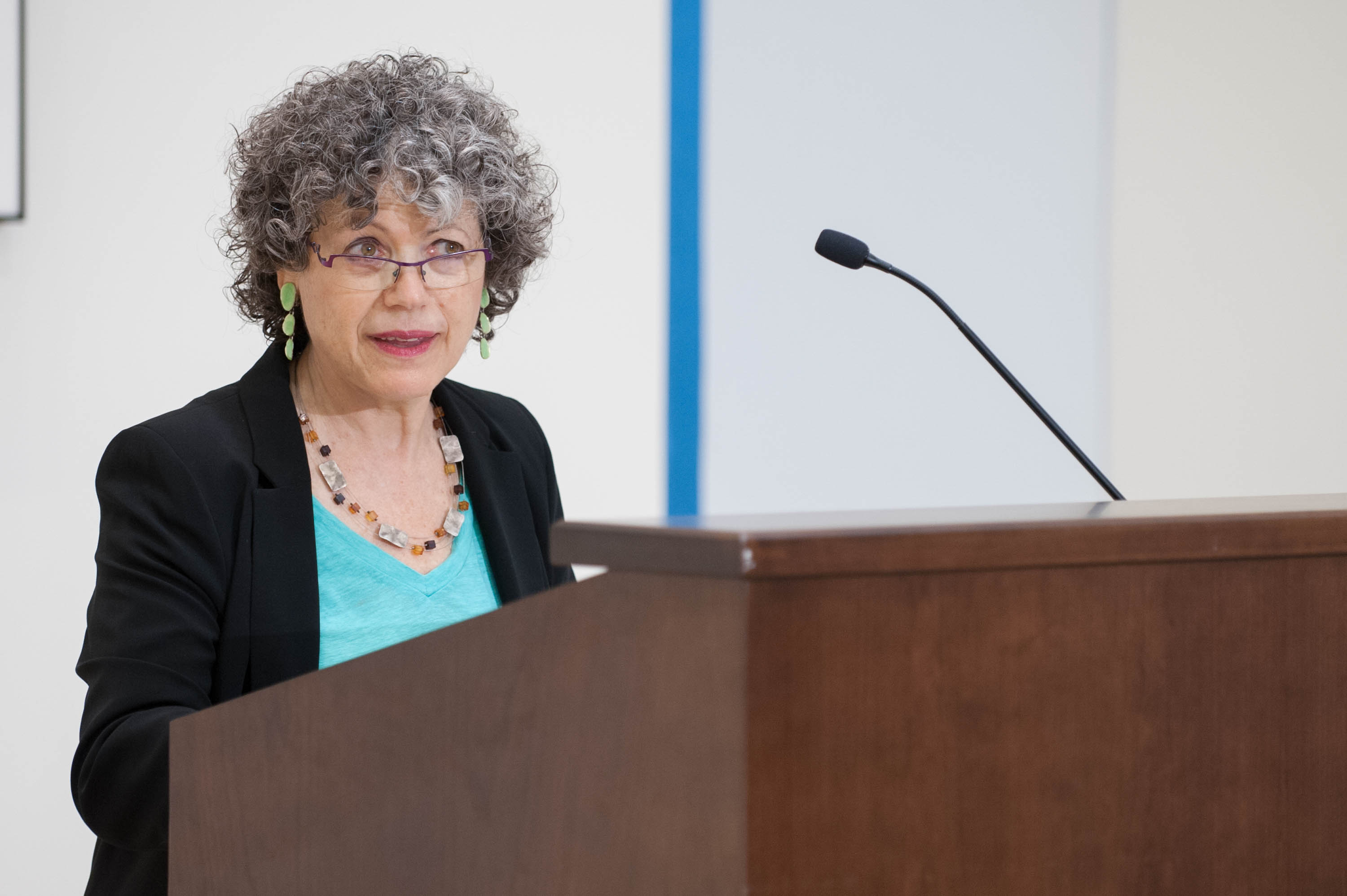
Vivien Schmidt at Boston University School of Law, 2016

Schmidt's work is situated at the intersection of political theory (democratic theory and epistemology), comparative politics (especially France but also Germany, the UK, and Italy), and international relations (the European Union). The three principal areas of interest that have defined her intellectual and academic trajectory are: European integration and its impact on national policies, processes, and democracy; European and national political economic and social policies; and the epistemological and methodological underpinnings of such research in ‘institutional theory.’

Schmidt's interest in institutional theory and epistemology, and her highly innovative discursive institutionalism, began with her PhD dissertation, which was focused on the philosophy of science and its implications for explanation in the social sciences, and political science in particular. It argued that rather than looking at what philosophers of science say about science, which often idealizes the lawlike approach of physics, we should look at what they do, which is to use the four primary methodological approaches in the social sciences to explain science —lawlike, sociological, historical, and interpretive. This insight served her well when the methodological wars began in political science in the 1990s, and comparative political scientists were enjoined no longer to do what they had long done, which was to intertwine interests, institutions, culture, and ideas and discourse into problem-oriented research on politics and policy. Instead, they split into different neo-institutionalist camps, focused on rational institutionalist incentive structures, historical institutionalist path dependency, or sociological institutionalist cultural framing. Left out was any overarching institutionalist theory for the ideational constructs of meaning, let alone the discursive dynamics of communication. Schmidt sought to fill this gap with what she has called discursive institutionalism, which she developed in stand-alone articles, most notably in two highly cited articles in the Annual Review of Political Science and the European Political Science Review, as well as in her work on democracy and political economy.

Discursive institutionalism gives a name to the very rich and diverse set of ways of explaining political and social reality that are focused on the substantive content of ideas and the interactive processes of discourse in institutional context (see e.g., Schmidt 2002, 2006, 2008, 2010). As such, it calls attention to the significance of approaches that theorize about ideas and discourse in their many different forms, types, and levels as well as in the interactive processes of policy coordination and political communication by which ideas and discourse are generated, articulated, and contested by sentient (thinking, speaking, and acting) agents. Discursive institutionalism is therefore open to a wide range of approaches focused on ideas and discourse. Discourse encompasses not just the representation or embodiment of ideas – as in discourse analysis (following, say, Foucault, Bourdieu, or Laclau and Mouffe) but also the interactive processes. These involve not only the discursive processes of coordination by and through which ideas are generated in the policy sphere by discursive policy communities and entrepreneurs but also the processes of communication, deliberation (e.g., Habermas), and /or contestation engaged in the political sphere by political leaders, social movements, and the public.

Schmidt's work on European policies, policymaking processes, and democracy dates back to her first book, Democratizing France (Cambridge 1990), and related publications on state policies and debates about the decentralization of French local government over time. It argues that while the terms of the policy debates pitting national unity against local liberty were set by the French Revolution, the legislative history was one in which political interest consistently trumped political principle except at two critical moments: in the 1870-80s, consecrating local democratic power through the election of the mayor; and in the 1980s, eliminating the prefect's a priori control plus establishing the election of the presidents of regions and departments.

Her subsequent work moved from local/national to national/supranational policymaking, by considering European integration and its impact on member-state policies and polities. In her book Democracy in Europe and related publications, she explored the nature and scope of EU integration and its effects on national democracy through doubly contrasting cases—the ‘simple polities’ of Britain and France versus the ‘compound polities’ of Germany and Italy. This is where she also began to develop the theoretical argument that is at the basis of her work on legitimacy, in which she added to the traditional terms of input legitimacy—government by and of the people via citizen participation and representation—and output legitimacy—governance for the people through policy results—the term ‘throughput’ legitimacy. This is about the quality of the policymaking processes, including their efficacy, accountability, inclusiveness, and openness to interest consultation with the people.

Schmidt's work on European political economic and social policies began with her second book From State to Market? (Cambridge 1996) and related publications. Here, she showed that despite major transformations in the Mitterrand years, the French state remained central not only through the dirigiste way in which it ended dirigisme but also in the fact that the retreat of the state from leadership of business actually meant the colonization of business by the men of the state. This study was followed by a third monograph, The Futures of European Capitalism, which examined the impact of globalization and Europeanization on the policies, practices, and politics of Britain's market capitalism, Germany’s managed capitalism, and France’s ‘state-enhanced’ capitalism. In the interim, she also co-directed an international research project at the Max Planck Institute in Cologne that resulted in a two-volume study, Welfare and Work in the Open Economy (co-edited with F. W. Scharpf, Oxford 2000) on the impact of international economic pressures on national social policy in twelve advanced industrialized countries. In this, she wrote a long chapter providing a comparative assessment of the role of values and discourse in the politics of adjustment that also helped crystallize her neo-institutionalist framework focused on ideas and discourse in institutional context.

More recently, Schmidt co-directed a collaborative project that resulted in Resilient Liberalism in Europe’s Political Economy (co-edited with M. Thatcher—Cambridge 2013), which offers five lines of analysis to explain the resilience of neo-liberal ideas: their ideational adaptability, their rhetoric without the reality of implementation, their dominance in debates, their strategic use by interests, and their embedding in institutions.

Schmidt's latest work on discursive institutionalism, developed in conjunction with Martin Carstensen (Carstensen and Schmidt 2016, 2017), helps lend insight into the power of ideas and discourse. Instead of either ignoring ideas or subsuming them under the classic understandings of power as coercive, structural, institutional, and productive, discursive institutionalism separates out ideational and discursive power in order to highlight its distinctive attributes. This power is conceptualized in three ways: persuasive power through ideas and discourse, coercive power over ideas and discourse, and structural/institutional power in ideas and discourse. Most common in discursive institutionalism is power through ideas, which occurs when actors have the capacity to persuade other actors of the cognitive validity and/or normative value of their worldview through the use of ideational elements via their discourse. Power over ideas is the capacity of actors to control and dominate the meaning of ideas through discourse. This may occur directly, say, by elite actors’ coercive power to impose their ideas by monopolizing public discourse and action (often as an addition to their material resources for coercion), or indirectly, by actors shaming opponents into conformity (e.g., when social movements push elites to adopt their ideas and discourse) or by resisting alternative interpretations (e.g., when neo-liberal economists shut out neo-Keynesian alternatives). Finally, power in ideas is found where certain discourses serve to structure thought (as in analyses following Foucault, Bourdieu, or Gramsci) or where particular ideas are institutionalized at the expense of others by being embedded in the rules or frames (as in historical or sociological institutionalist approaches to ideas).

== Selected publications ==
Books

- Democratizing France: The Political and Administrative History of Decentralization. New York: Cambridge University Press, 1990, reissued 2007
- Welfare and Work in the Open Economy 2 vols. (co-edited with Fritz W. Scharpf). Oxford: Oxford University Press, 2000
- The Futures of European Capitalism. Oxford: Oxford University Press, 2002. (356pp). Chinese translation: Beijing: Social Sciences Academic Press, 2010
- Democracy in Europe: The EU and National Polities. Oxford: Oxford University Press, 2006. French Translation: La Démocratie en Europe Paris: La Découverte, 2010
- Resilient Liberalism in Europe’s Political Economy, co-edited with Mark Thatcher.Cambridge, UK: Cambridge University Press, 2013

Articles

- “Discursive Institutionalism: The Explanatory Power of Ideas and Discourse,” AnnualReview of Political Science vol. 11 (2008): 303–26.
- “Putting the Political Back into Political Economy by Bringing the State Back Yet Again.” World Politics vol. 61, no. 3 (2009): 516–548.
- “Taking Ideas and Discourse Seriously: Explaining Change through Discursive Institutionalism as the Fourth New Institutionalism.” European Political Science Review vol. 2, no. 1 (2010): 1-25
- “Democracy and Legitimacy in the European Union Revisited: Input, Output and ‘Throughput.” Political Studies vol. 61, no. 1 (2013): 2-22
- “Power through, over and in ideas: Conceptualizing ideational power in discursive institutionalism.” (with Martin Carstensen) Journal of European Public Policy vol. 23, no. 3 (2016): 318–337.
- “Power and Changing Modes of Governance in the Euro Crisis” (with Martin Carstensen). Governance (2017) early view: https://doi.org/10.1111/gove.12318
