= Mall =

Mall commonly refers to a:

- Shopping mall
- Strip mall
- Pedestrian zone
- Esplanade

Mall, The Mall or MALL may also refer to:

== Places ==
- The Mall, or the Esplanade of the European Parliament, Brussels
- The Mall, Kanpur, the central business district of the city Kanpur, Uttar Pradesh, India
- Mall, Ranga Reddy, a village in Telangana, India
- The Mall, Lahore, a road in Lahore, Pakistan
- The Mall, Armagh, a cricket ground in Armagh, Northern Ireland, United Kingdom
- The Mall, London, the landmark ceremonial approach road to Buckingham Palace, City of Westminster, Central London, United Kingdom
- Pall Mall, London, a street in the St James's area of the City of Westminster, Central London, United Kingdom
- The National Mall, an open-area national park in downtown Washington, D.C., United States
- The Mall (Cleveland), a long public park in downtown Cleveland, Ohio, United States

=== Shopping complexes ===
- The Mall (Bromley), London, United Kingdom
- The Mall (Patna), Bihar, India
- The Mall (Sofia), or Tsarigradsko Mall, Sofia, Bulgaria
- Mall St. Matthews, formerly The Mall, Louisville, Kentucky, United States
- Sunway Putra Mall, formerly The Mall, Kuala Lumpur, Malaysia

== People ==
- Joel Mall (born 1991), Swiss football goalkeeper
- Linnart Mäll (1938–2010), Estonian historian, orientalist, translator and politician
- Mac Mall (born 1975), American rapper

== Arts, entertainment, and media ==
- "Mall" (Abbott Elementary), a three-part episode of the American TV series Abbott Elementary
- Mall (album), a 1991 album by Gang of Four
- Mall (film), a 2014 film by Linkin Park's turntablist Joe Hahn
- Mall (soundtrack), a soundtrack album from the film
- "Mall" (song), a 2017 song by Eugent Bushpepa that represented Albania in the Eurovision Song Contest 2018
- "Mall", by C418 from Minecraft - Volume Beta, 2013
- "The Mall" (What We Do in the Shadows), an episode of the American TV series What We Do in the Shadows

== Other uses ==
- MALL, a protein
- Multiplicative-additive linear logic, a fragment of linear logic with no exponential entailment rules
- Mall Airways, regional airline in eastern United States and Canada from 1973 to 1989
- Mobile-assisted language learning (MALL), language learning that is assisted or enhanced through the use of a handheld mobile device
- The Mall Fund, which owns "The Mall" shopping centres in the United Kingdom
- The Mall Group, which owns "The Mall" shopping centres in Thailand

== See also ==
- 6teen, a Canadian sitcom whose working title was The Mall
- Mall of Arabia (disambiguation)
- Mall Plaza (disambiguation)
- Mall Road (disambiguation)
- Lists of shopping malls
- Malla (disambiguation)
- MALS (disambiguation)
- Maul (disambiguation)
- Mole (disambiguation)
