= Mal =

Mal or MAL may refer to:

== Places ==
- Mal (community development block), in Jalpaiguri district of West Bengal, India
- Mal (Vidhan Sabha constituency), an assembly constituency in Jalpaiguri district of West Bengal, India
- Malbazar or Mal, a town in Jalpaiguri located in North Bengal, India
- Mal, Lucknow, a village in Lucknow district of Uttar Pradesh, India
- Mar-a-Lago, a resort in Palm Beach, Florida

== Acronyms ==
- MAL (gene), a human gene that encodes myelin and lymphocyte protein
- Maackia amurensis leukoagglutinin, lectin from the tree Maackia amurensis
- MAL Hungarian Aluminium, a Hungarian aluminum manufacturer
- Maritime Administration of Latvia, government agency of Latvia that oversees maritime affairs
- Median arcuate ligament, a ligament under the diaphragm on the posterior abdominal wall
- Message Abstraction Layer, a CCSDS Spacecraft Monitor and Control standard
- Methyl aminolevulinate, a photosensitizer used for photodynamic therapy for skin problems
- Mid-America League, a short-lived independent minor baseball league
- Military Authority Lira, another name of the Tripolitanian lira
- Model Arab League, an educational program that simulates the activities of the Arab League
- MonetDB Assembly Language, an assembly-like language used by the MonetDB database
- MyAnimeList, an anime and manga social networking and social cataloging application website

== People ==
- Mal people, an ethnic group of Southeast Asia
- Mal (caste), a Hindu group of India
- Mal Muslim, a Muslim group of India and Bangladesh
- Mal (name), a list of people with the given name or nickname
- Mal (prince) (died 946), prince of the Drevlians
- Mal Nicol (born 1997), Scottish television personality
- Mal (singer) (born 1944), stage name of British singer Paul Bradley Couling
- Suraj Mal (1707–1765), ruler of Bharatpur in Rajasthan, India
- Suraj Mal of Nurpur, Rajput ruler (1613–1618) of Nurpur, Himachal Pradesh in India
- Todar Mal (died 1589), finance minister of the Mughal Empire during the reign of Akbar the Great
- Min Aung Hlaing (born 1956), Burmese army general

== Fictional characters ==
- MAL (Captain Planet), Dr. Blight's evil supercomputer in the Captain Planet and the Planeteers series
- Mal Duncan, a DC comic book character
- Mal Reynolds, protagonist of the Firefly science-fiction franchise
- Mal (Descendants), Maleficent's daughter in the 2015 Disney film Descendants & its sequels
- Mal, in the film Inception, played by Marion Cotillard
- Mal, Mike's evil alternate personality and the antagonist of Total Drama All-Stars
- Malori "Mal" Crowett, title character in the webtoon Mage & Demon Queen
- Mal Oretsev, character in the book series Shadow and Bone and its TV adaptation

== Transport ==
- Malaysia Airlines
- Malden Manor railway station, London, National Rail station code MAL
- Malta (Amtrak station), a rail station in Montana, station code MAL
- Malvern railway station, Melbourne
- MV Malaspina, a ferry for Alaskan maritime commerce

== Other uses ==
- Mal (film), a 1999 Portuguese drama film
- Mal (surfing), the longboard style of surfboard
- Mal language, a Mon–Khmer language of Laos and Thailand
- Alaskan Malamute dog, nickname
- Malaysia, UNDP and license plate country code
- Belgian Malinois dog, nickname
- Methallylescaline, a hallucinogenic drug
- Mal: Live 4 to 1, an album by Mal Waldron
- mal (unit), a Korean unit of volume
- mål, a Norwegian units of measurement of area
- Malayalam language, ISO 639-3 code
- "El Mal" (song), 2024 song featured in the film Emilia Pérez
- El mal (film), a 2025 Spanish thriller film
- Rage (1966 film), a 1966 Mexican-American drama film, titled El mal in Spanish

== See also ==
- MALS (disambiguation)
- Malla (disambiguation)
- Mala (disambiguation)
