= Esplanade =

Long, open, level area near a river or larger water body

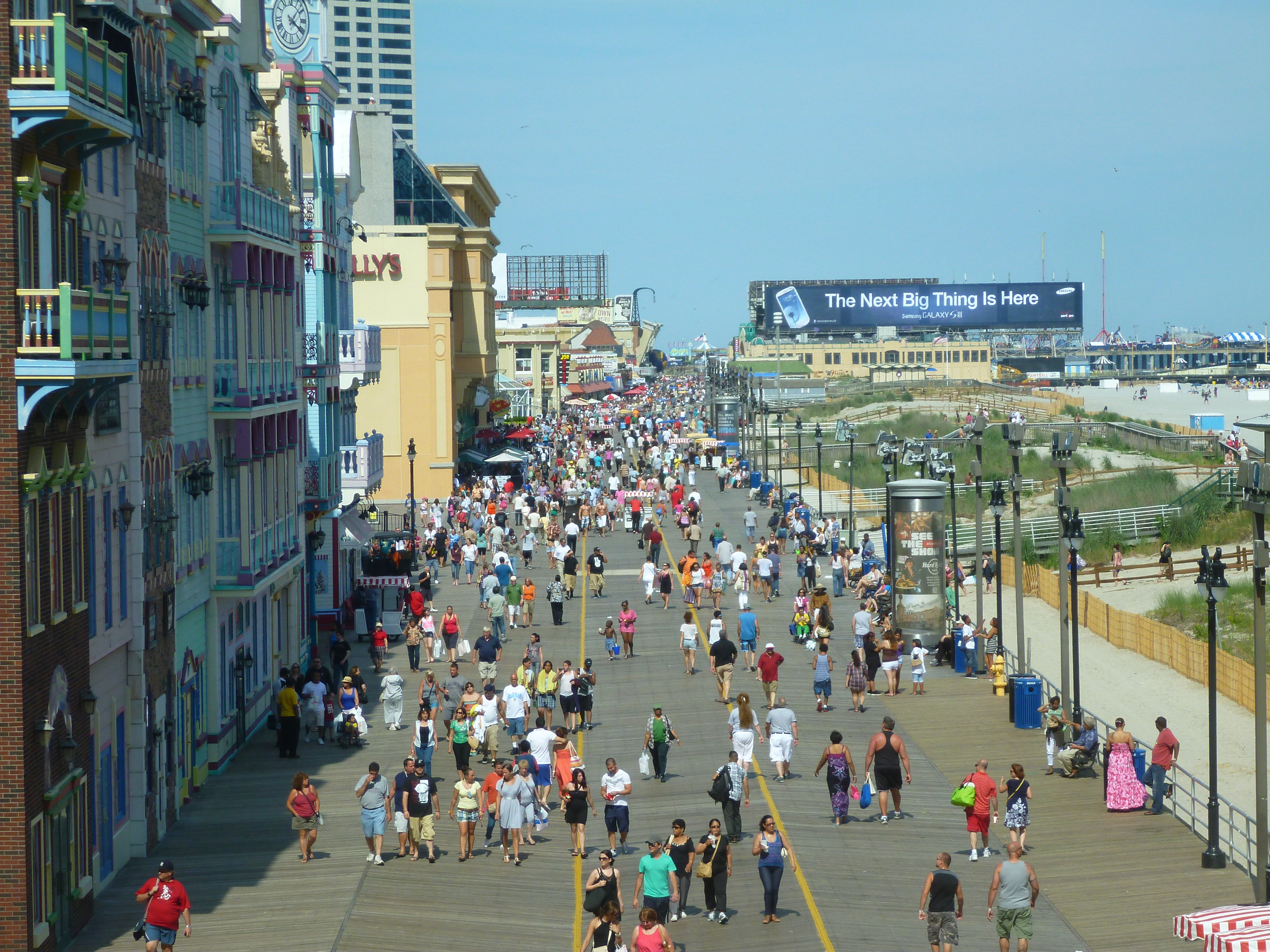
The Atlantic City, New Jersey boardwalk esplanade, as seen from Caesars Atlantic City, opened in 1870, was the first boardwalk in the US. At 5 1/2 miles (9 km) long, it is also the world's longest and busiest boardwalk. New Jersey is home to the world's highest concentration of boardwalk esplanades.

An esplanade or promenade is a long, open, level area, usually next to a river or large body of water, where people may walk. The historical definition of esplanade was a large, open, level area outside fortress or city walls to provide clear fields of fire for the fortress's guns. In modern usage, the space allows the area to be paved as a pedestrian walk; esplanades are often on sea fronts and allow walking whatever the state of the tide, without having to walk on the beach.

== History ==
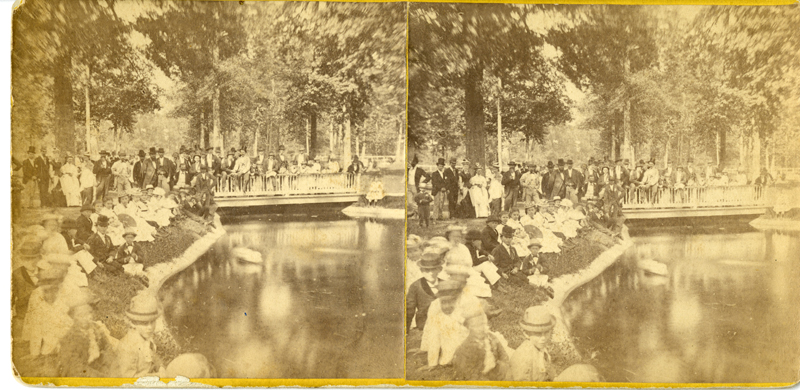
Central City Park, Macon, GA; May Day, 1876

In the 19th century, the razing of city fortifications and the relocation of port facilities made it possible in many cities to create promenade paths on the former fortresses and ramparts. The parts of the former fortifications, such as hills, viewpoints, ditches, waterways and lakes have now been included in these promenades, making them popular excursion destinations as well as the location of cultural institutions. The rapid development of artificial street lighting in the 19th century also enabled safe use in the evening. One example of this is Vienna's Ringstrasse.

Esplanades became popular in Victorian times, when it was fashionable to visit seaside resorts. A promenade, often abbreviated to '(the) prom', was an area where people – couples and families especially – would go to walk for a while in order to 'be seen' and be considered part of 'society'. Beach promenades such as the Promenade de la Croisette in Cannes, the famous Promenade des Anglais on the Mediterranean coast in Nice or the Lungomare of Barcola in Trieste still play a central role in city life and in the real estate market.

In the United States, esplanade has another meaning, being also a median (strip of raised land) or berm dividing a roadway or boulevard. Sometimes they are just strips of grass, or some may have gardens and trees. Some roadway esplanades may be used as parks with a walking/jogging trail and benches.

Esplanade and promenade are sometimes used interchangeably. The derivation of "promenade" indicates a place specifically intended for walking, though many modern promenades and esplanades also allow bicycles and other nonmotorized transport. Some esplanades also include large boulevards or avenues where cars are permitted.

A similar term with the same meaning in the eastern coastal region of Spain is alameda Alameda de Hercules, Seville, o rambla, such as La Rambla in Barcelona, but more widely used terms in the rest of the Hispanic world are paseo marítimo ("esplanade"), paseo ("promenade") or explanada ("esplanade").

== Examples ==
=== Asia ===
==== India ====
- Esplanade, also known as the Central Business District in Kolkata
- Kamarajar Salai, Chennai in Chennai
- Marine Drive, Kochi in Kochi
- Marine Drive in Mumbai
- Bandstand Promenade in Mumbai
- Promenade Beach in Pondicherry

==== Malaysia ====
- Esplanade, Kuantan, Pahang
- Esplanade, George Town, Penang
- Gurney Drive, George Town, Penang
- Karpal Singh Drive, George Town, Penang

==== Philippines ====
- Baywalk, Manila
- Dipolog Boulevard, Dipolog
- Iloilo River Esplanade, Iloilo City
- Paseo del Mar, Zamboanga City
- Pasig River Esplanade

==== United Arab Emirates ====
- Al Seef
- Corniche (Abu Dhabi)
- Deira Corniche
- Fujairah Corniche

==== Others ====
- Tsim Sha Tsui East, Victoria Harbour in Hong Kong
- West Kowloon Waterfront Promenade, West Kowloon Cultural District in Hong Kong
- Tel Aviv Promenade, Tel Aviv, Israel
- Corniche Beirut, Beirut, Lebanon
- The Esplanade, Singapore
- Galle Face Green, Colombo, Sri Lanka
- Doha Corniche, Doha, Qatar
- The Bund, Shanghai, China
- Jehangir Kothari Parade, Pakistan
- Jeddah Corniche, Saudi Arabia

=== Americas ===
==== United States ====
- Ala Wai Promenade, Honolulu, Hawaii
- Charles River Esplanade, Boston, Massachusetts
- Eastern Promenade, Portland, Maine
- The Esplanade, Redondo Beach, California
- Third Street Promenade, Santa Monica, Los Angeles County, California
- Eastbank Esplanade, Portland, Oregon
- East River Greenway, New York, New York

==== Others ====
- Bulevar Marítimo Patricio Peralta Ramos, Mar del Plata, Argentina
- Calçadão de Copacabana and Calçadão de Ipanema, Rio de Janeiro, Brazil
- Malecón, Puerto Vallarta, Mexico
- Malecón, Havana, Cuba
- Paseo del Morro, Old San Juan, Puerto Rico
- Paseo de la Princesa, Old San Juan, Puerto Rico
- Rambla de Montevideo, Uruguay
- Terrasse Dufferin, Quebec City, Canada

=== Europe ===
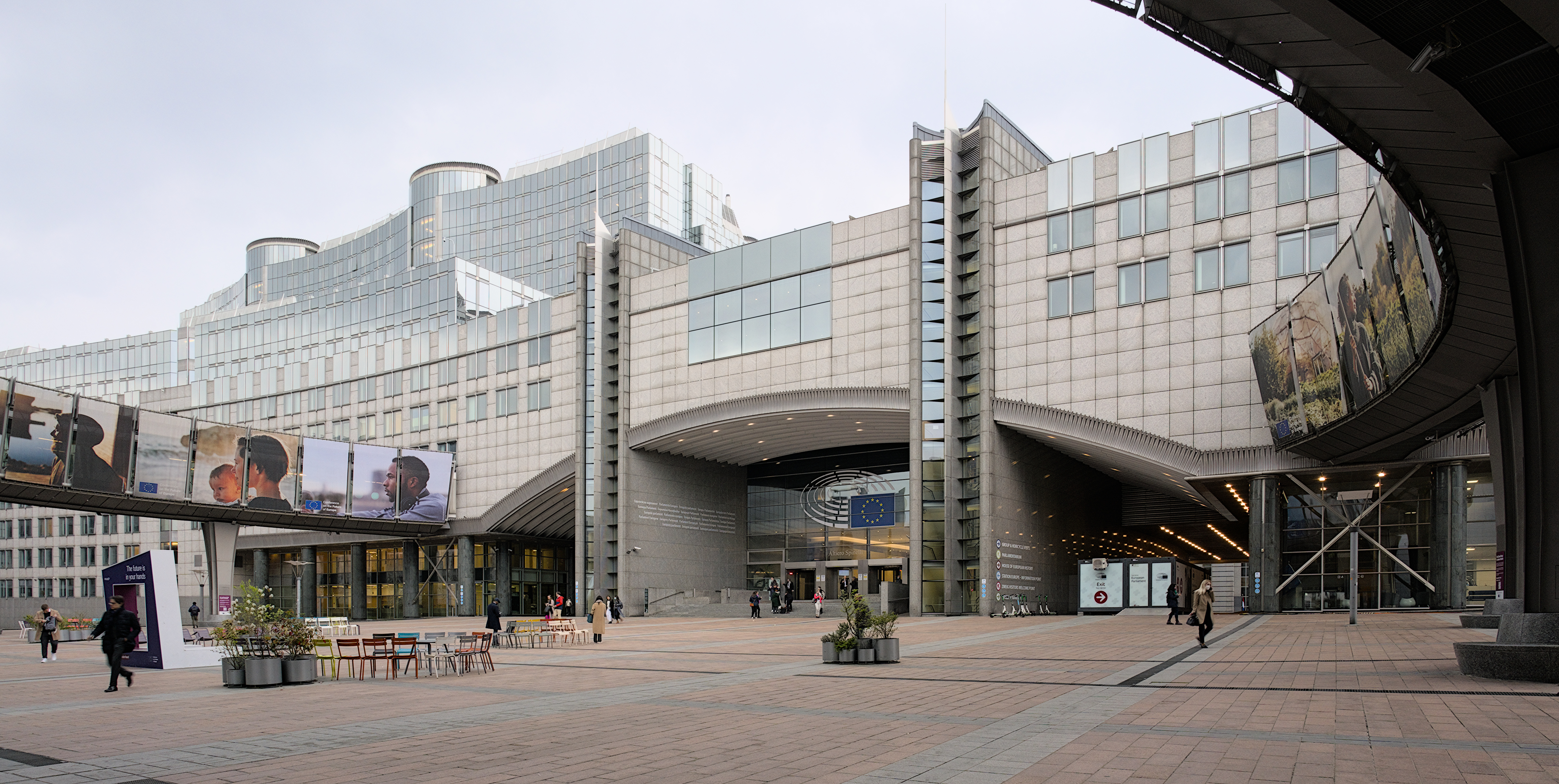
Esplanade of the European Parliament, Brussels, Belgium

- Barcola, Trieste, Italy
- Esplanaden, Copenhagen, Denmark
- La Promenade des Anglais, in Nice, France
- Esplanade de La Defense, France
- Paseo Marítimo de Pontevedra, in Pontevedra, Spain
- Usedom Beach Promenade, Western Pomerania, Germany (Europe's longest beach promenade)
- Świnoujście, by the Baltic Sea, Poland
- Trzebież, by the Szczecin Lagoon, Poland
- The Esplanade, in Weymouth, England
- Esplanadi, in Helsinki, Finland
- Valletta Waterfront, in Floriana, Malta
- Spianada, in Corfu town, Greece
- Brighton Promenade, England
- Port Solent in Paulsgrove, Portsmouth, England

=== Others ===
- St Clair Esplanade in Dunedin, New Zealand
- The Golden Mile, Durban, South Africa
- Sea Point, Cape Town, South Africa

=== Inland ===
- Esplanade of the European Parliament, in Brussels, Belgium
- Ministries Esplanade, in Brasília, Brazil
- The Esplanade (Toronto), in Toronto, Canada
- Thames Embankment, in London, England
- Brühl's Terrace, Dresden, Germany
- The Danube Promenade in Budapest, Hungary
- Esplanade, in Calcutta, India
- Iloilo River Esplanade in Iloilo City, Philippines
- Błonia, Kraków, Poland
- L'Enfant Plaza in Washington, D.C., United States
- Charles River Reservation, in Boston, Massachusetts, United States
- The Eastbank Esplanade, in Portland, Oregon, United States

== Gallery ==
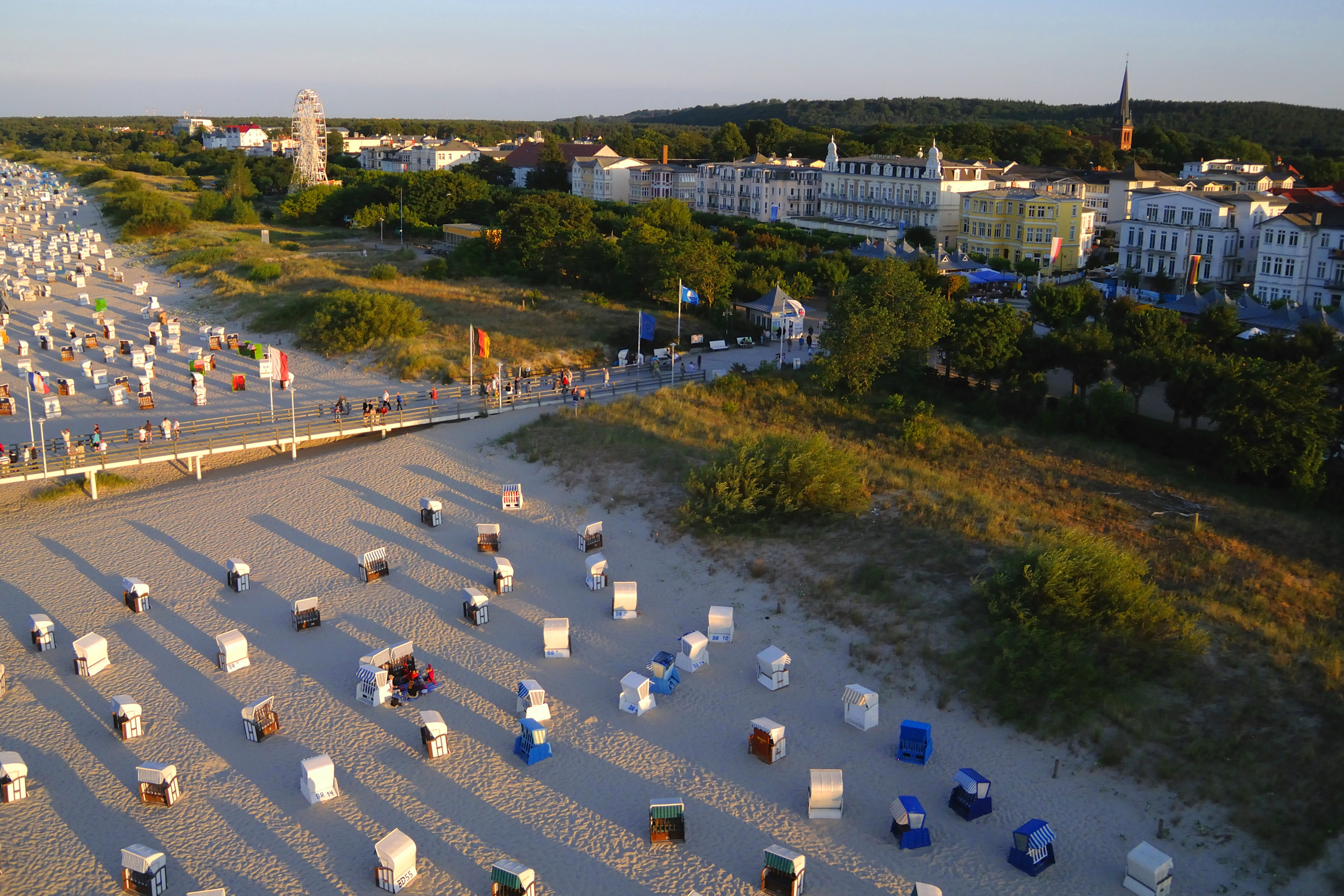
Usedom, Western Pomerania, Germany - longest beach promenade in Europe (Ahlbeck here)

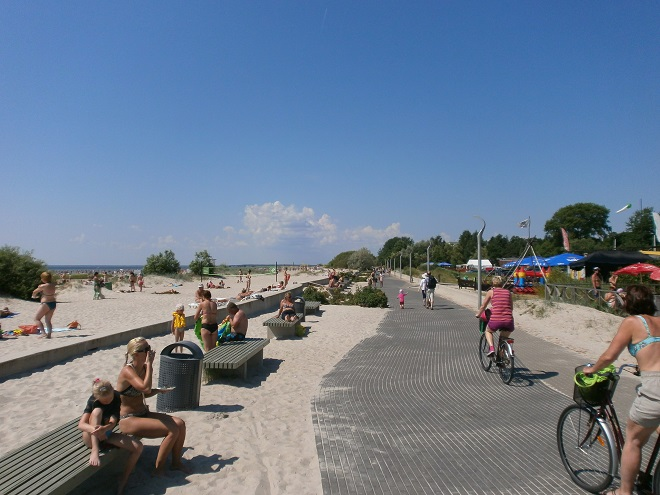
Pärnu's beach promenade, Pärnu County, Estonia

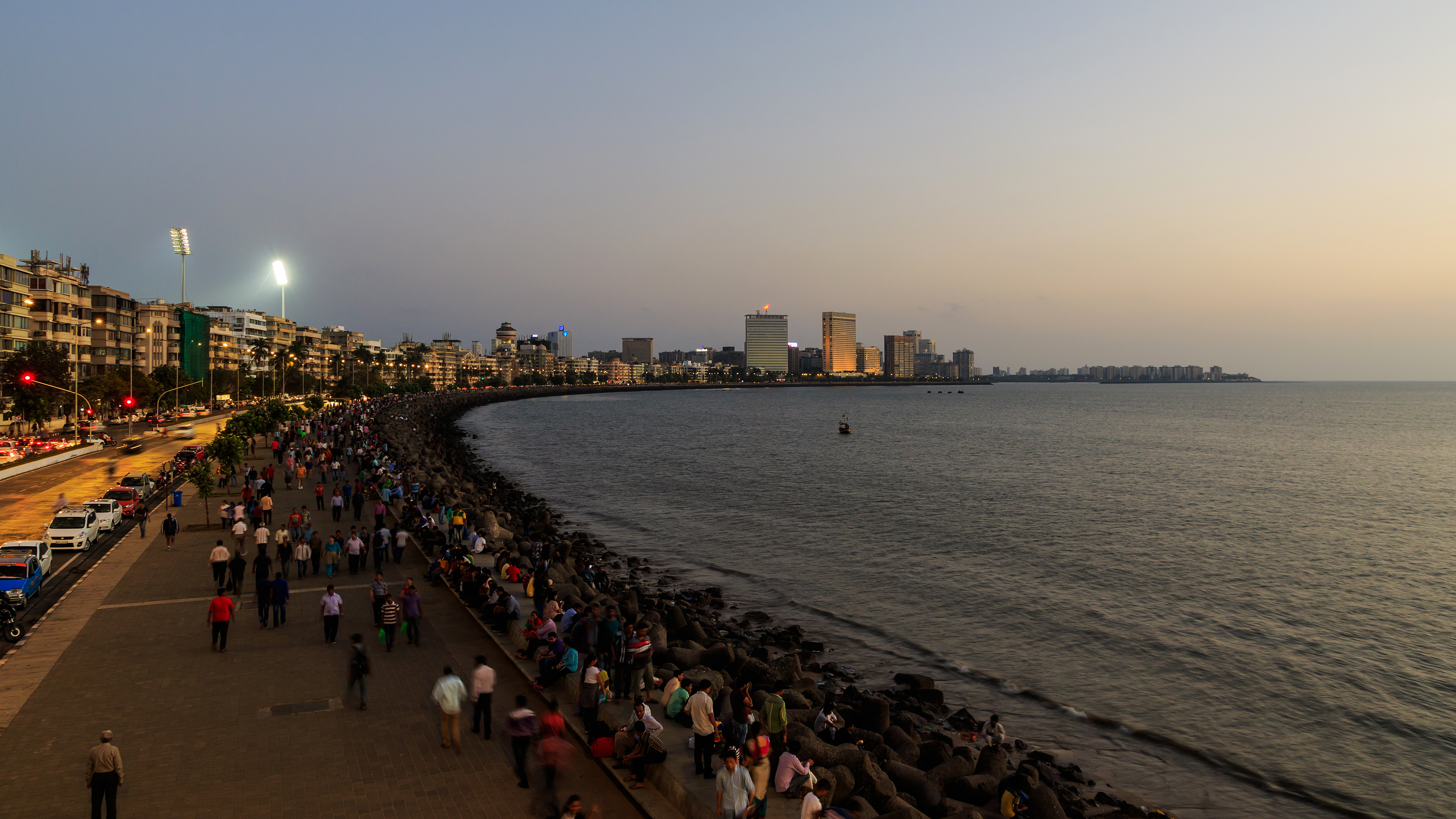
Marine Drive, Mumbai, India

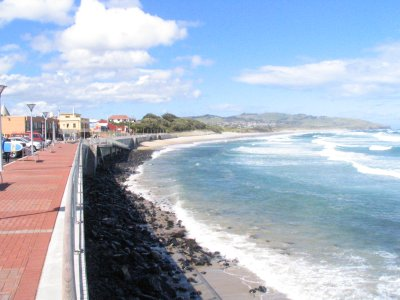
St Clair Beach and esplanade, Dunedin, New Zealand

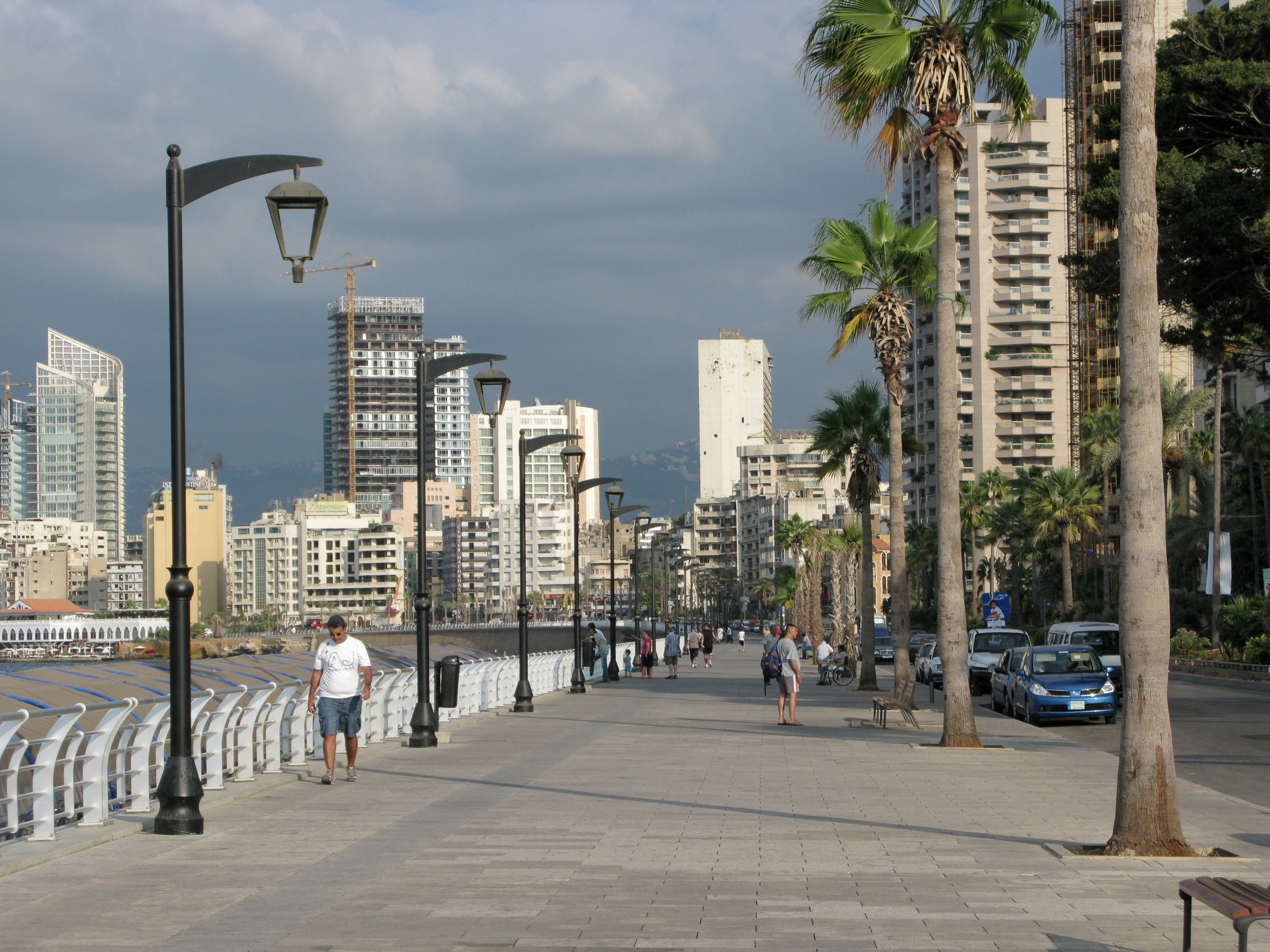
The Corniche, Beirut, Lebanon

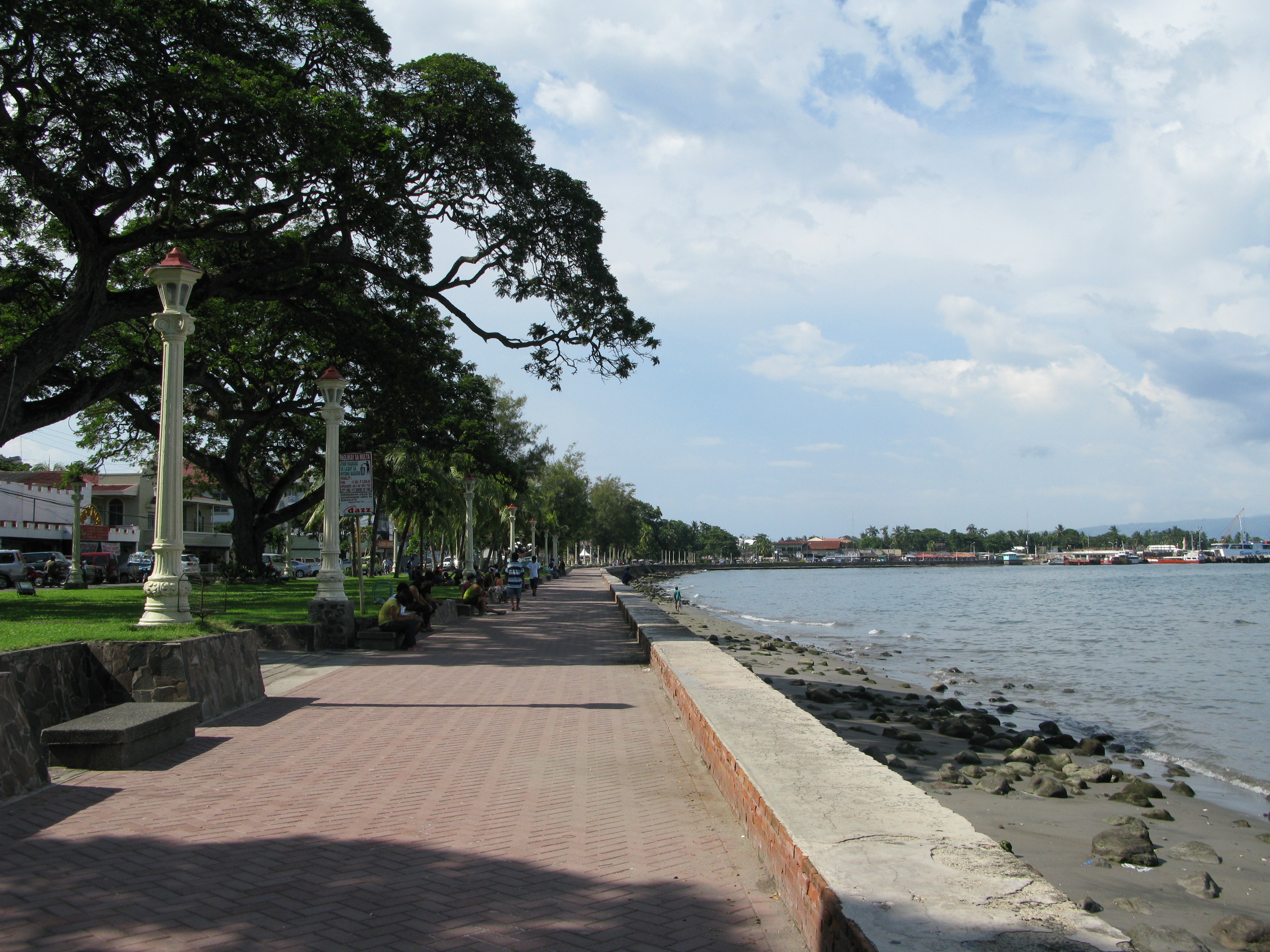
Promenade on Rizal Boulevard in Dumaguete, Philippines

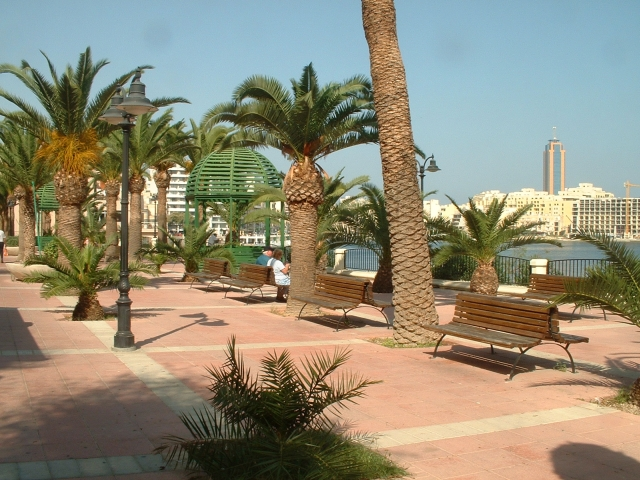
Sliema promenade, Malta

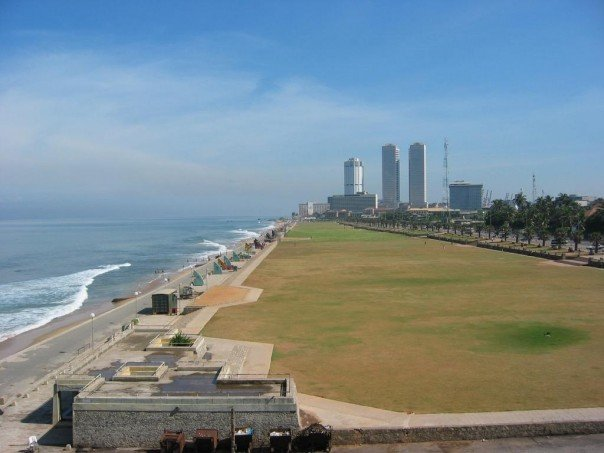
The Galle Face Green esplanade, Colombo, Sri Lanka

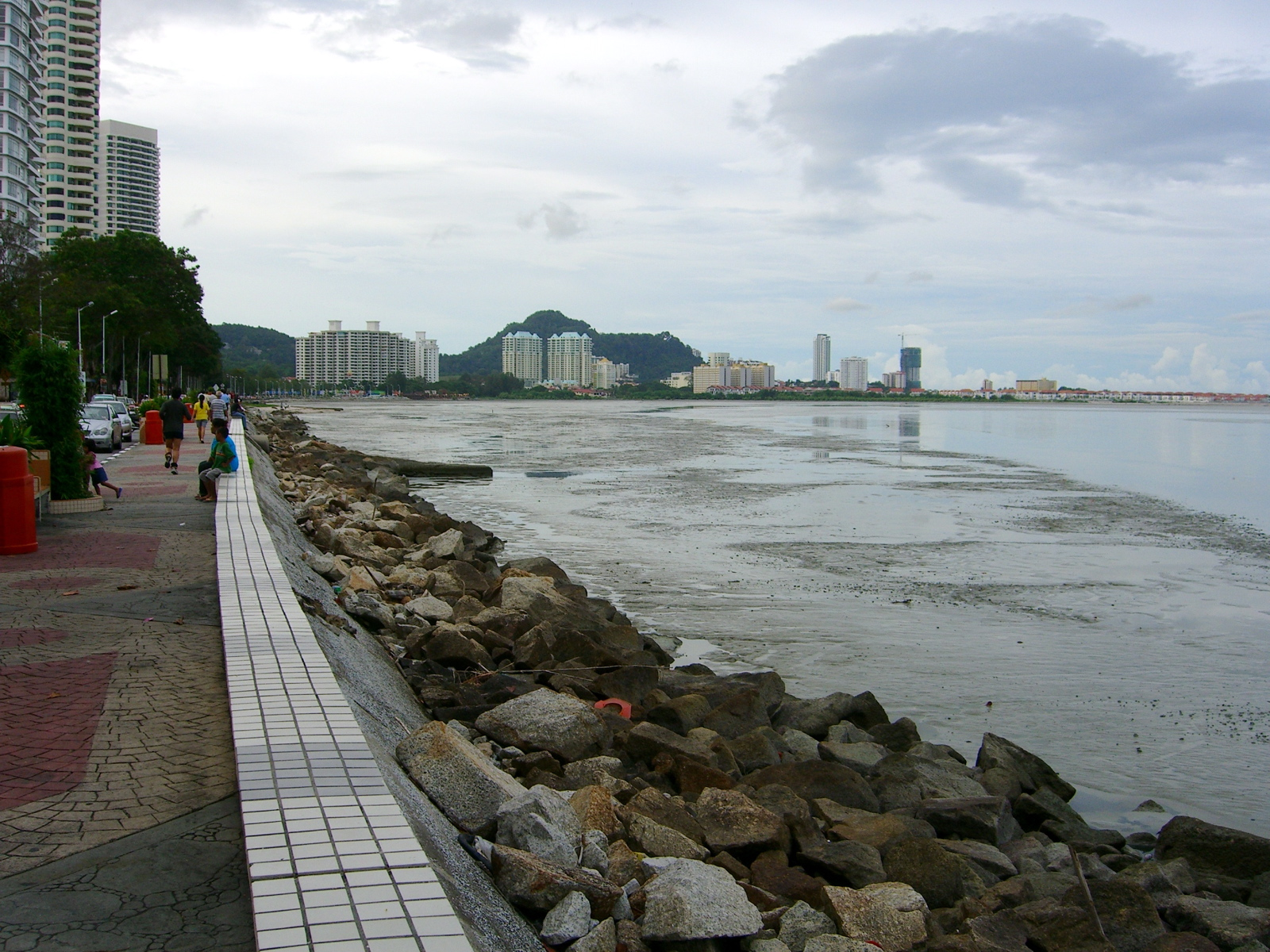
Gurney Drive, Penang, Malaysia

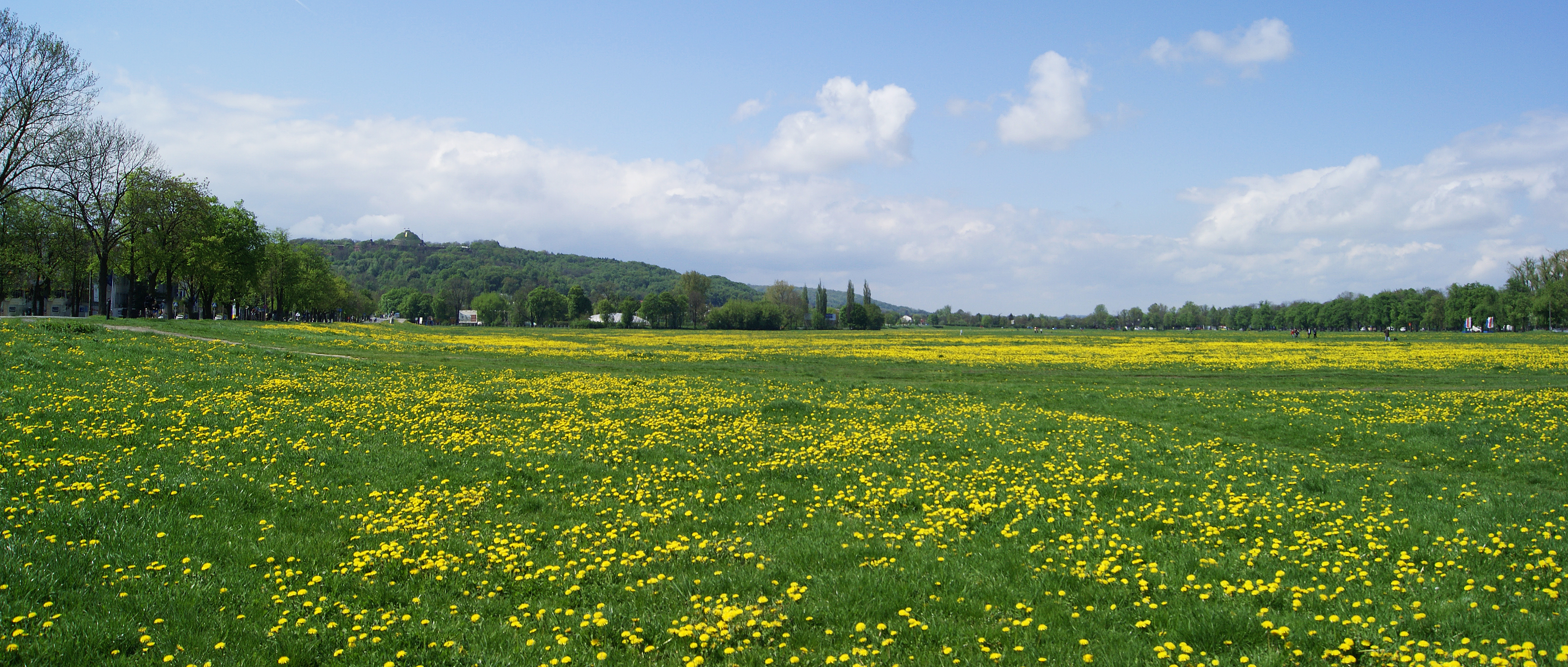
Błonia, Kraków, Poland

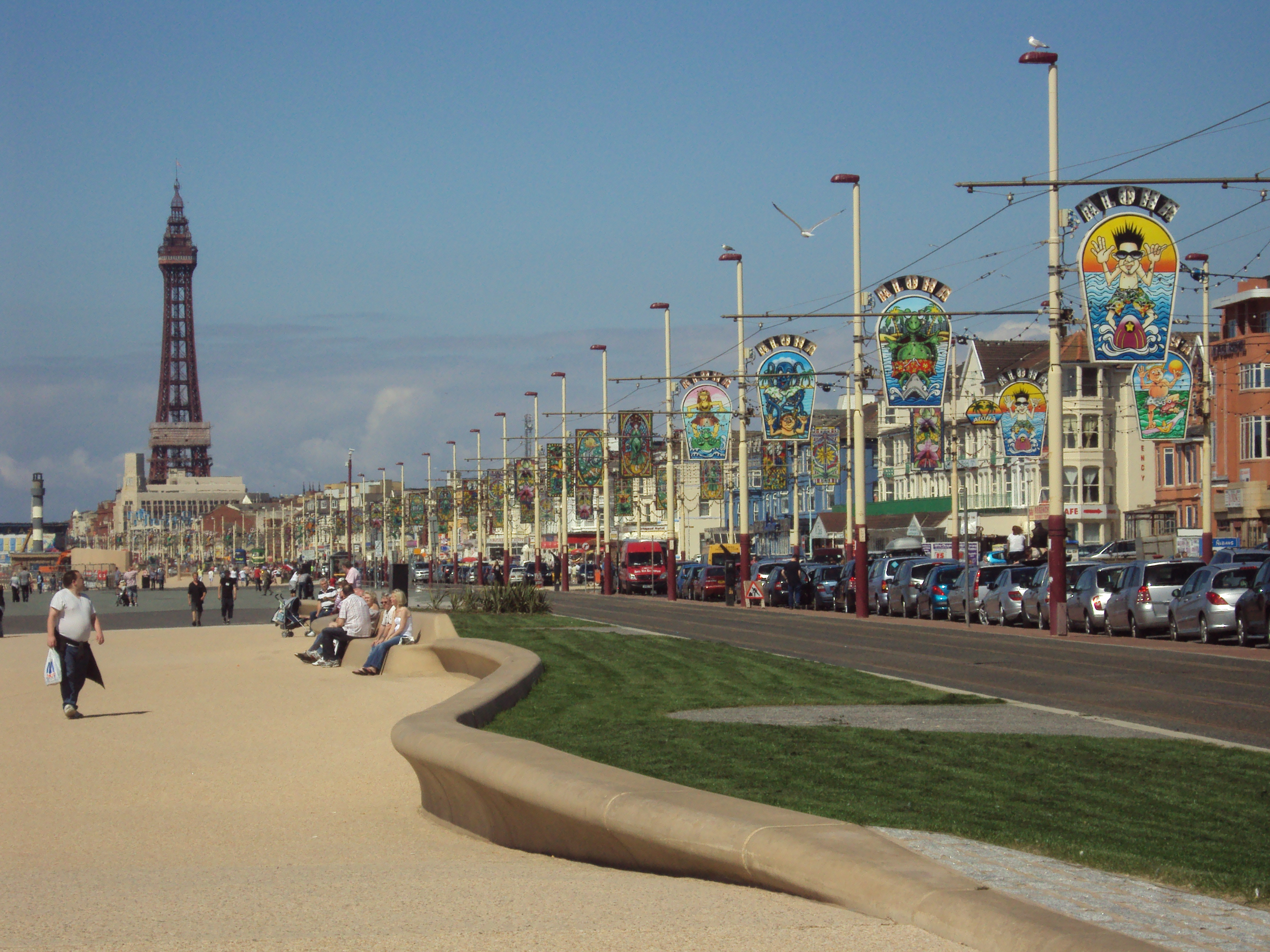
Blackpool's regenerated Promenade, England

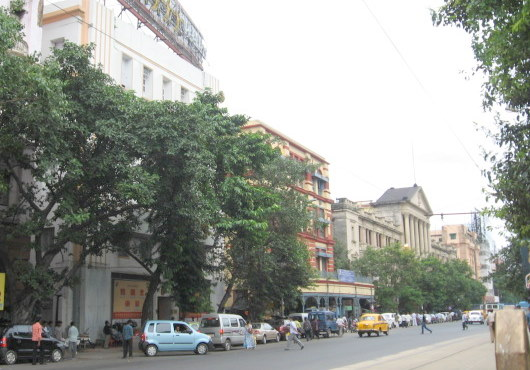
Esplanade Row East, Kolkata, India

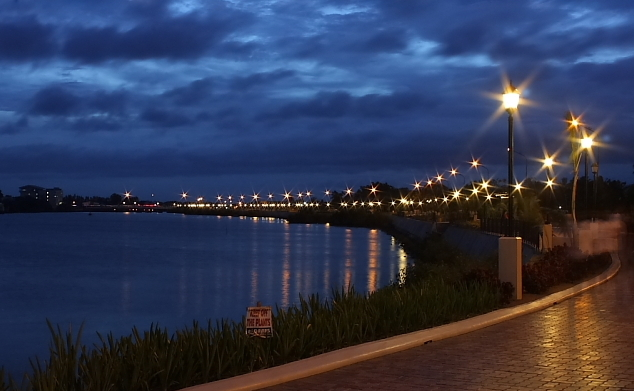
Iloilo River Esplanade, Iloilo City, Philippines - the longest linear park in the Philippines

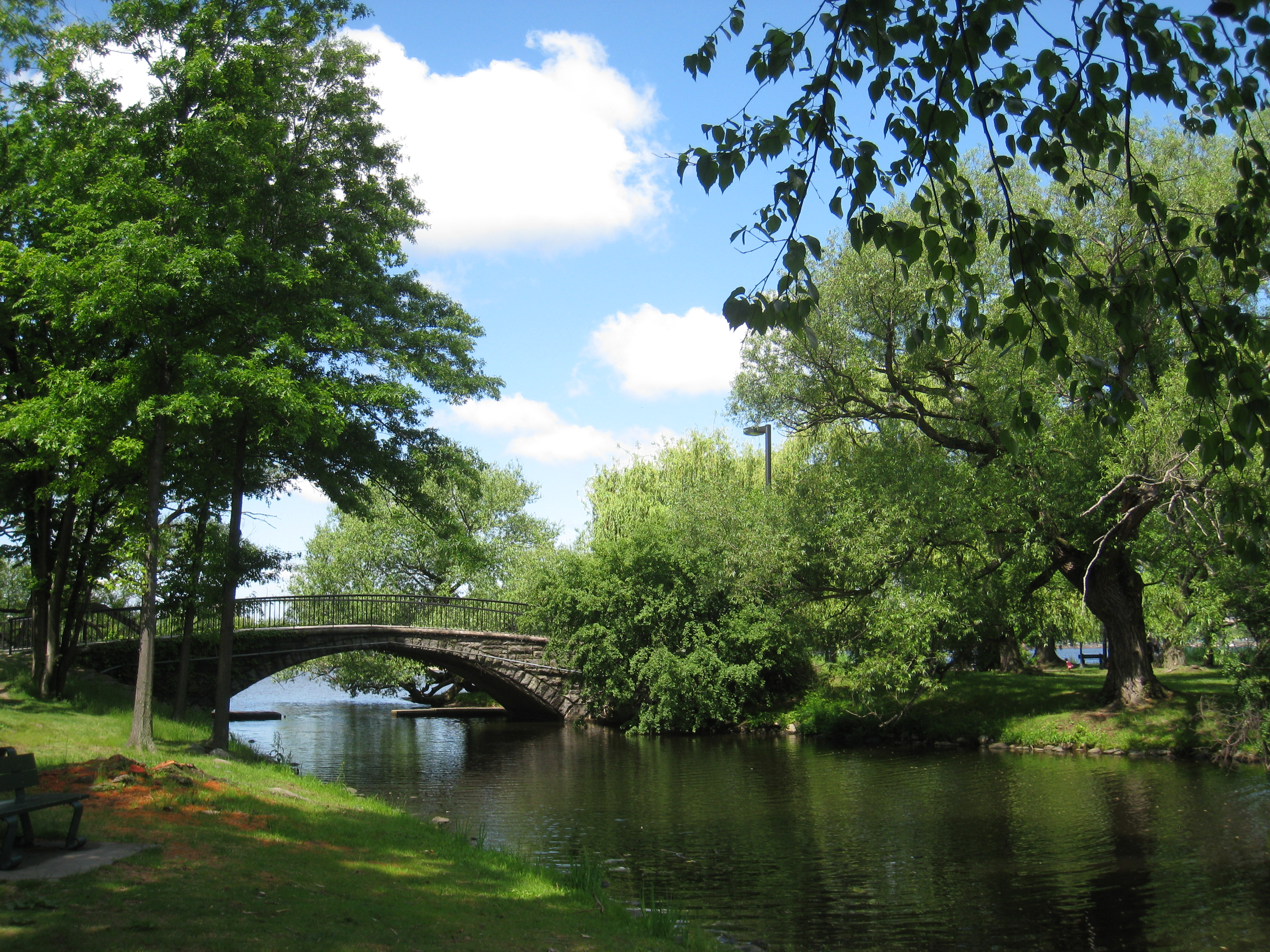
Boston Esplanade, Boston, United States

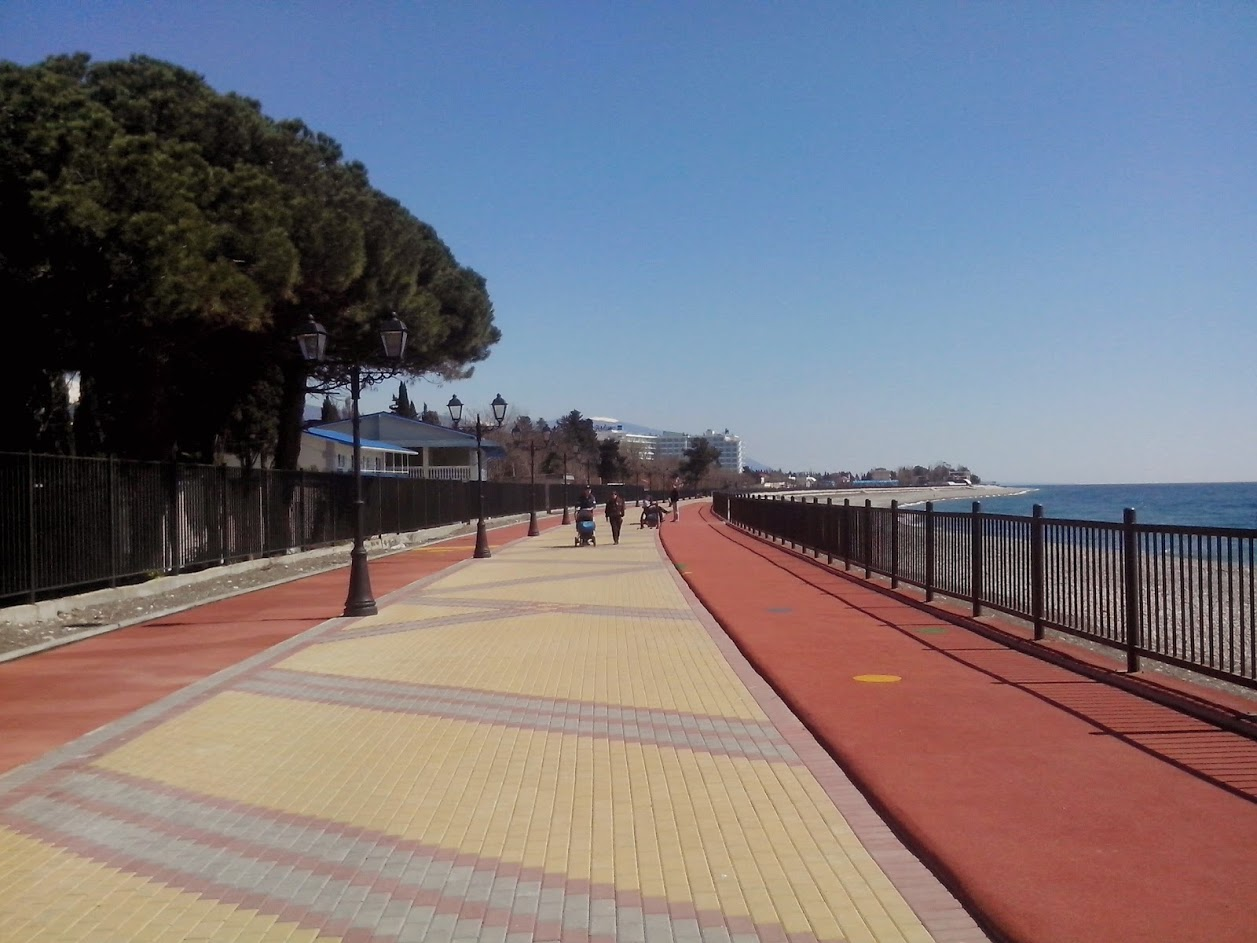
Esplanade in the Olympic Park of Sochi, Russia

== See also ==
- Boardwalk
- Foreshoreway
- Malecón
- Oceanway
- Processional walkway
- Similar areas inland: Boulevard, mall
