= MALS =

Mals or MALS may refer to:

- Mals or Malles Venosta, a comune (municipality) in South Tyrol in northern Italy
- Mäls, a village of Liechtenstein
- Mals (unit), Korean units of volume
- Master of Arts in Liberal Studies, a degree program
- Medium-intensity Approach Lighting System, a landing aid for airport runways
- Miwatj Aboriginal Legal Service, now merged into the North Australian Aboriginal Justice Agency
- Median arcuate ligament syndrome, an abnormal tightening of the median arcuate ligament under the diaphragm on the posterior abdominal wall
- Mitsubishi Air Lubrication System, a system to reduce ship's drag
- Multiangle light scattering, a technique for determining physical properties of molecules in solution

== See also ==
- Mal (disambiguation)
- Mall (disambiguation)
