= Parlamentarium =

Visitor centre in Brussels, Belgium

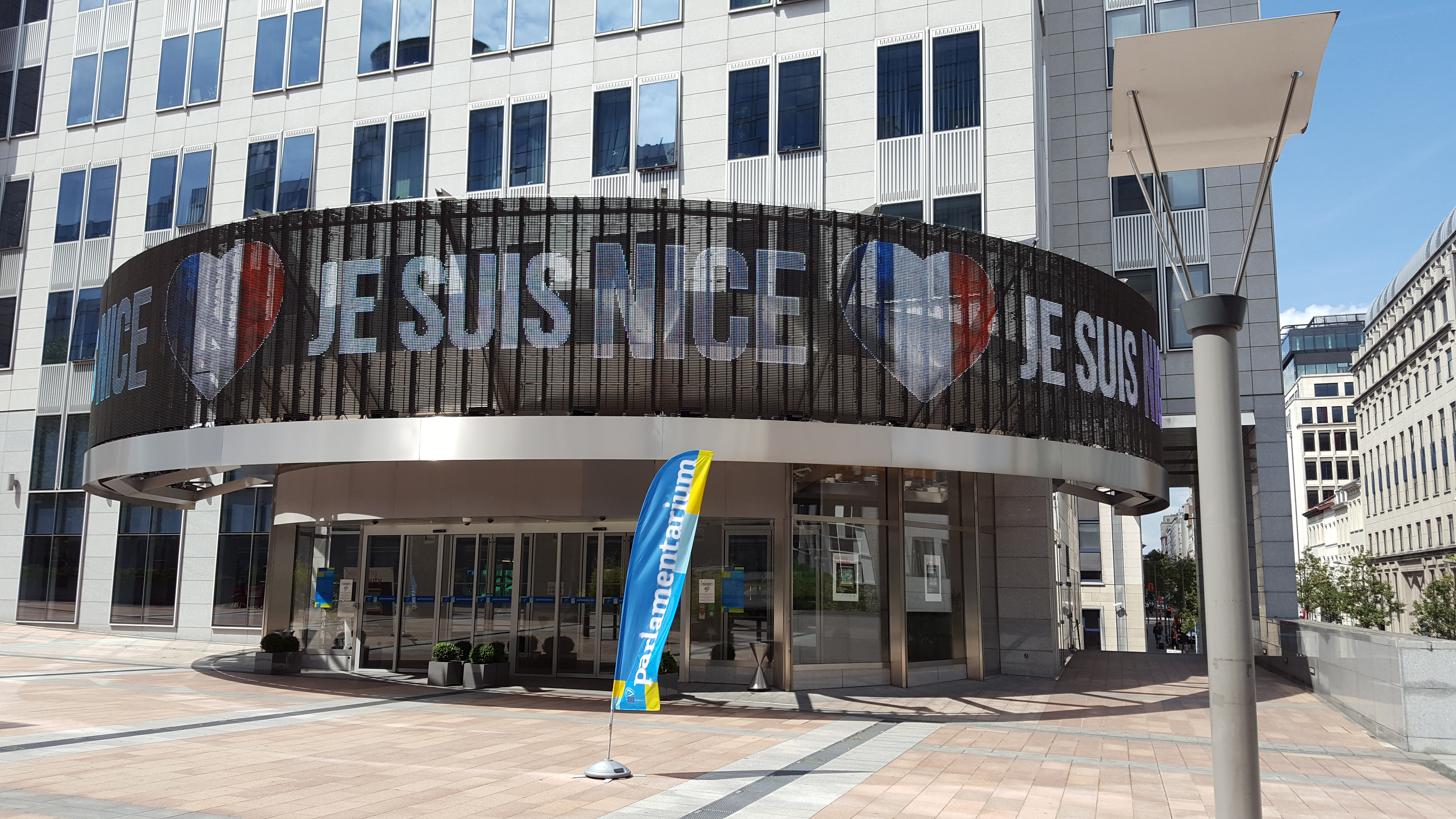
- Entrance of the Parlamentarium
- Interactive map of the Parlamentarium area

General information
- Type: Visitor centre
- Location: Brussels, Belgium
- Coordinates: 50.839969°N 4.374177°E
- Inaugurated: 14 October 2011

Website
- European Parliament Parlamentarium

The Parlamentarium is the European Parliament's visitor centre, located in the Espace Léopold complex in Brussels, Belgium. Officially opened on 14 October 2011 by the Parliament's then-president, Jerzy Buzek, it hosts a permanent exhibition featuring numerous multimedia components that explain the workings of the European Parliament and other EU institutions. Situated on the Parliament's esplanade, the Parlamentarium is noted as the largest parliamentary visitor centre in Europe and ranks second worldwide in size.

Visitors to the Parlamentarium are provided with a Personal Multimedia Guide (PMG), which offers an interactive tour through the exhibition, displaying content relevant to each area; all materials in the Parlamentarium are available in the 24 official EU languages. The PMG is needed for accessing each installation, offering detailed information, audio commentary through an in-ear speaker, and short films in the selected language. The cinema shows a 360° view of Europe and its Parliament, while an interactive floor map gives a virtual tour of Europe. The centre also accommodates tours for children and people with disabilities.

== See also ==
- House of European History
- Brussels and the European Union
- Institutional seats of the European Union
