= Espace Léopold =

Complex of European Parliament buildings in Brussels, Belgium

- Espace Léopold (French); Leopoldruimte (Dutch)
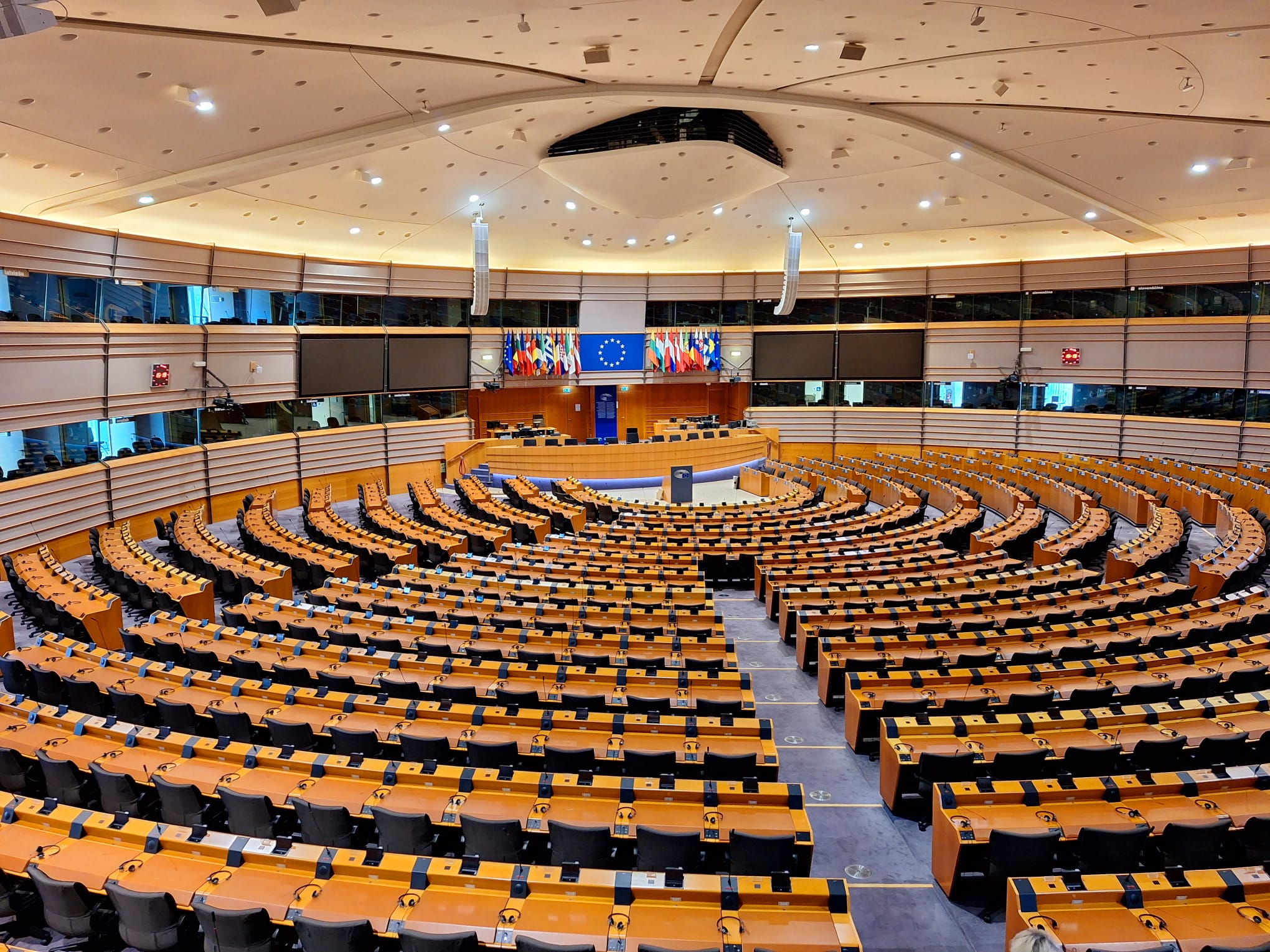
- The Parliamentary hemicycle
- Interactive map of the Espace Léopold area

General information
- Type: Parliament building
- Architectural style: Postmodern
- Location: Rue Wiertz / Wiertzstraat 60, 1047 City of Brussels, Brussels-Capital Region, Belgium
- Coordinates: 50°50′19″N 4°22′34″E
- Current tenants: European Parliament
- Construction started: 1989
- Completed: 1995 (original building); 2008 (latest extension)
- Inaugurated: 1993; 33 years ago
- Owner: n.v. Forum Leopold s.a.

Height
- Height: 61 m (200 ft)

Dimensions
- Diameter: 142 m (466 ft)
- Other dimensions: 87,000 m^{2} (940,000 sq ft)

Technical details
- Floor count: 17

Design and construction
- Architects: Michel Boucquillon with "Association des Architectes du CIC" & Atelier Espace Léopold
- Structural engineer: Tractebel
- Other designers: Michel Boucquillon
- Main contractor: CFE

The Espace Léopold (French; commonly used in English) or Leopoldruimte (Dutch;) is the complex of parliament buildings in Brussels, Belgium, housing the European Parliament, a legislative chamber of the European Union (EU). It consists of a number of buildings, primarily the oldest, the Paul-Henri Spaak building, which houses the debating chamber and the president's offices, and the Altiero Spinelli building, which is the largest. The buildings are located in the European Quarter of Brussels, with construction starting in 1989.

The complex is not the official seat of the European Parliament, which is the Louise Weiss building in Strasbourg, France, but as most of the other institutions of the European Union are in Brussels, the European Parliament built the Brussels complex to be closer to its activities. A majority of the European Parliament's work is now geared to its Brussels site, but it is legally bound to keep Strasbourg as its official home.

== History ==
=== Inception and construction ===
Due to the failure of leaders to agree on a single seat, the European Parliament desired full infrastructure in both Brussels and Strasbourg, where the European Parliament's official seat is located. In Brussels, an international congress centre (unofficially intended as the European Parliament) was built with the backing of the Société Générale de Belgique and BACOB, which joined forces on the project in 1987. The project was built on the site of an old brewery and marshalling yard, which included covering Brussels-Luxembourg railway station to form a pedestrian area. The building project started before 1988 with construction work on the hemicycle and the north wing starting in 1989 and the south wing in 1992.

The policy committees, inter-parliamentary delegations and the political groups all meet in the complex. Consequently, the secretariat of the committees (DG IPOL and DG EXPO) and the political groups are all situated there as well. Construction on the Spinelli building started in 1991 and was completed in 1997, whilst the last phase of extensions (Antall and Brandt), towards the Place du Luxembourg/Luxemburgplein along the Rue de Trêves/Trierstraat, was completed during 2008.

Following the completion of Antall and Brandt, it is believed the complex now provides enough space for the European Parliament for the next ten to fifteen years with no major new building projects foreseen. Three quarters of parliamentary activity now take place in the Espace Léopold, rather than Strasbourg.

In 2008, the final extensions to the complex were completed along the Rue de Trêves and the Place du Luxembourg. Originally called the D4 and D5 buildings, there was controversy as to whom to name them after. At the death of Pope John Paul II, Polish MEPs tried to get the new buildings named after him, though this was opposed on grounds of secular government and that he did not contribute to the European Parliament. Václav Havel, Nelson Mandela, Olof Palme, Margaret Thatcher and Jan Palach were all suggested by MEPs, with one satirical suggestion was naming the two buildings the "Kaczyński Towers" after the Polish brothers Lech and Jarosław Kaczyński, the first the late former president and the latter formerly prime minister (2006–07), who enjoy a frosty relationship with Brussels. In January 2008, the bureau reached a final decision. The new buildings were named after Willy Brandt, the German chancellor from 1969 to 1974, and József Antall, the first elected Hungarian prime minister from 1990 to 1993. The bridge connecting the new building to the original structure was named the Konrad Adenauer footbridge, after the German chancellor from 1949 to 1963. Meanwhile, the European Parliament's press room was named after the assassinated Russian journalist, Anna Politkovskaya.

In September 2008, the European Parliament held its first full plenary session (only part sessions are held in Brussels, see Location of European Union institutions) in Brussels after parts of the ceiling of the Strasbourg chamber collapsed during recess, forcing the temporary move.

On 14 January 2009, the European Parliament decided to bestow the names of two distinguished and deceased MEPs to specific locations inside the building: the reading room inside the building's library was named Salle Francisco Lucas Pires and the assembly room of the Conciliation Committee was named Salle Renzo Imbeni.

=== Ceiling cracks and renovation ===
In a turn of events reminiscent of the Strasbourg hemicycle ceiling collapse of 2008, three beams supporting the plenary chamber's ceiling were found to be cracked in August 2012. This in turn led to a complete closure for "at least six months" (as announced on 9 October 2012) of the A section of the Paul-Henri Spaak Building. In early December 2012, it became known that the damage was more serious than previously thought, and that the closure of the hemicycle was expected to last "until November 2013". All "mini plenary" meetings in Brussels until this date were scrapped, a decision that was met with "fury" by some MEPs.

In 2019, the European Parliament announced an open international design competition for the renovation and refurbishment of the Paul-Henri Spaak building. Of the 132 proposals submitted for consideration, 15 architects, including OMA, Snøhetta, Renzo Piano Building Workshop, Shigeru Ban Architects, and Dominique Perrault were selected to participate in the final round of the competition. In July 2022, the winning team of JDS Architects, Coldefy, Carlo Ratti Associati, NL Architects, and Ensamble Studio was announced. The estimated cost of the project is €500 million.

== Buildings ==
The Espace Léopold is a complex of buildings built from 1989 to 2004 in postmodern style. It consists of the Paul-Henri Spaak building (which houses the debating chamber), the Altiero Spinelli building, two new buildings known as the Willy Brandt and József Antall buildings and a newly refurbished building which was the former entrance to the Brussels-Luxembourg railway station. Between the Spinelli buildings and the Brant-Antall buildings, which are connected by the circular Konrad Adenauer footbridge, runs the Esplanade of the European Parliament (or "the Mall").

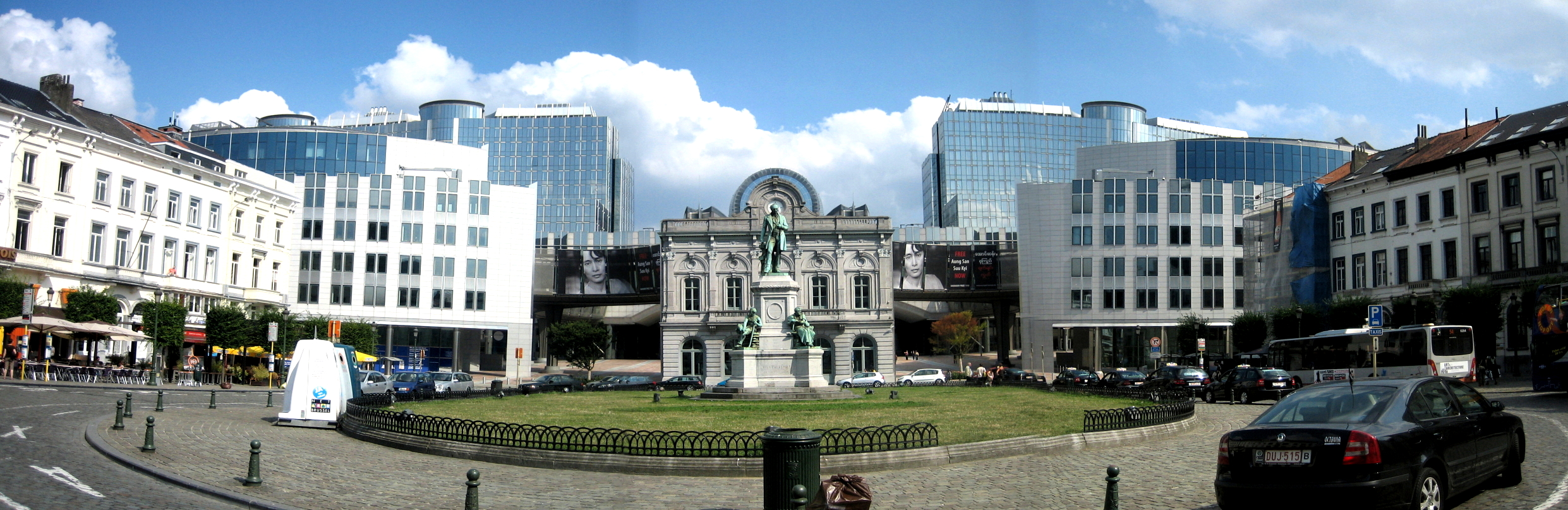
The western face of the European Parliament after the completion of its latest extension towards the Place du Luxembourg/Luxemburgplein

=== Paul-Henri Spaak building ===
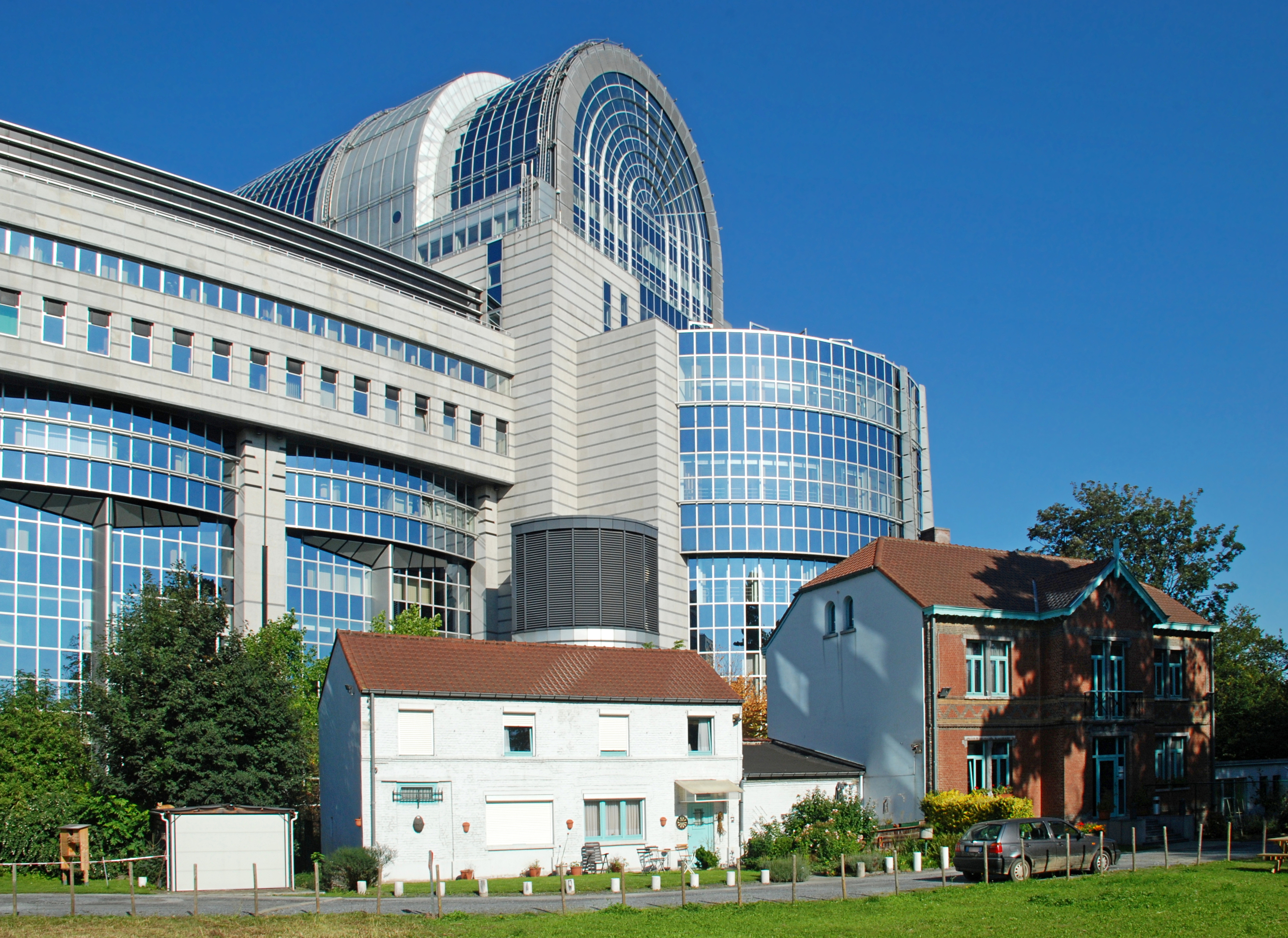
Paul-Henri Spaak building

The Paul-Henri Spaak building (PHS), named after former President Paul-Henri Spaak, houses among other things the hemicycle (debating chamber) for plenary sessions in Brussels, as well as a press centre and offices for the European Parliament's president and senior parliamentary staff.

In 1988, the building was the subject of an architectural competition organised by the Association des Architectes du CIC and won by the architect Michel Boucquillon. He holds the authorship and copyright recognised by the European Parliament. The CIC Architects' Association was composed of the CRV, CDG, Bontinck and Vanden Bossche offices. On the other hand, the other buildings facing the Paul-Henri Spaak building and the Esplanade were designed by the Atelier Espace Léopold in the early 1990s; they also included four architectural offices: the Atelier d'Architecture de Genval, the Cerau group, CRV and the Atelier Vanden Bossche.

Michel Boucquillon designed the building in the oval shape, a symbol of union. The façade is intended to reflect the essential notions of transparency, democracy and proximity to citizens. Parliamentarians enter the axis of the building while spectators, including the press, enter laterally. He conceived the hall of the hemicycle as a vast working space. The aim was to provide a sober, comfortable and human-scale environment that encourages exchange and dialogue. The focus is on the space of the 627 parliamentarians by visually erasing the 532 seats in the gallery. The latter is totally black in order to be absent. The atrium is the "lung" of the building, its role is to allow light or "truth" to flow to the level of the hemicycle. It was therefore essential to imagine a wall and a material that allowed light to flow down. The material had to be transparent to the eye. The woven stainless steel cloth fulfilled this role well. This material had never been used for architectural purposes before.

The building juts from the main buildings out into Leopold Park, surrounding the far side with trees. With its striking cylinder-shaped glass dome, redolent of the Crystal Palace, as well as the Northern Bordiau Hall of the nearby Parc du Cinquantenaire/Jubelpark, the building known to locals as the Caprice des Dieux ("Whim of the Gods"), which is a well-known brand of cheese with the same shape. The 12th floor President's Dining Room is the dome's interior. This is being used for some press events and special occasions. One of the glass façades inside the dome is covered with a 150 m^{2} (1,600 sq ft) large ceramic mural called Miti del Mediterraneo, portraying the abduction of Europa and other elements of Greek mythology, which was made between 1992 and 1993 by Aligi Sassu.

=== Altiero Spinelli building ===
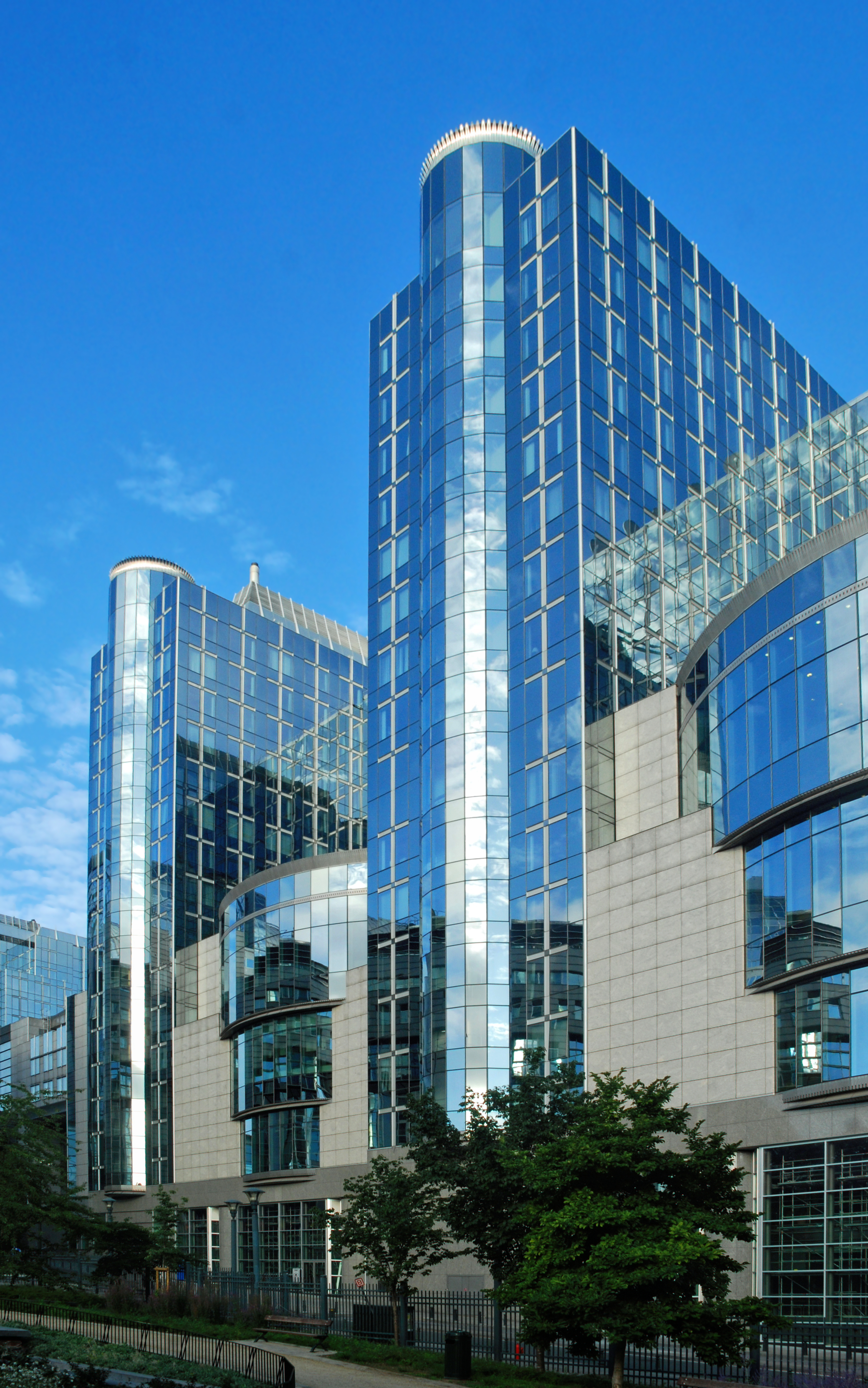
Altiero Spinelli building

To the west of the Paul-Henri Spaak building is the Altiero Spinelli building, connected by a two-floor pedestrian bridge. The Altiero Spinelli building (ASP, formerly D3), named after parliamentarian Altiero Spinelli, primarily houses the offices of MEPs and political groups. It also houses shops, cafeteria and the members' bar. It is the largest building with 372,000 m^{2} (4,000,000 sq ft) of space and incorporates five high-rise towers, each up to 17 floors.

=== Other and former buildings ===
The buildings west of Spinelli are connected via the circular Konrad Adenauer footbridge (across the Esplanade) to the Willy Brandt building (WIB, formerly D4), the József Antall building (JAN, formerly D5) and the old railway station building (BQL). The Brandt building began to be occupied in July 2007 by the external policies DG and the European Conservatives and Reformists group. The new complex has 375 offices in the Brandt building and 5 conference rooms (with 25 interpreters' booths) in the Antall building, in addition to new press facilities. The first meeting in the Antall building took place on 7 October 2008.

The ground floor (on the Rue de Trêves' side) of the Antall building includes an entrance to Brussels-Luxembourg railway station. The old station building (originally called Leopold Quarter railway station) has been turned into a public information office and venue for ad hoc exhibitions. The first of such exhibitions, on the history of buildings in the European Quarter of Brussels, was held in the summer of 2007.

To the north of the Spinelli building are the Atrium and Remard buildings. The Atrium I & II buildings (ATR) hosts the DG IPOL and some political groups secretariats. Number 1 was completed in 2000, and the second in 2004. The Remard building was rented from March 2004 for a period of 9 years, with the possibility of cancellation after 6 years for an annual rent of €1,387,205.

Other rented and minor buildings, outside the main complex but used by the European Parliament, include a number of buildings on the Rue Montoyer/Montoyerstraat, the Eastman building in Leopold Park (currently being expanded to host the House of European History), the Wiertz building, and the Wayenberg building further east of the park (used as a purpose-built creche for European Parliament staff and MEPs).

The entire European Parliament in Brussels used to be housed in the Belliard building, now called the Delors building (after former President Jacques Delors). This building, and the Bertha von Suttner (ATR) buildings (after pacifist Bertha von Suttner), which is part of the Espace Léopold, now house the Economic and Social Committee and the Committee of the Regions.

== Hemicycle ==
Members are arranged in a hemicycle according to their political groups who are ordered left to right according to their alignment. However, the non-attached members are seated on the right towards the outer ring without a front bench seat. All desks are equipped with microphones, headphones for interpretation and electronic voting equipment. The leaders of the groups sit on the front benches at the centre, and in the very centre is a podium for guest speakers. The remaining half of the circular chamber is primarily composed of the raised area where the president and staff sit. Behind them, there is an EU flag attached to the wall with national flags above it.

Interpreters' booths are located behind them and along the sides of the chamber, while public galleries are located at the rear. Further benches are provided between the sides of the raised area and the MEPs; these are taken up by the Council of the European Union on the far left and the European Commission on the far right. The chamber as a whole is of a wooden design, unlike the hemicycle in Strasbourg, and was extensively renovated in 2003 to create more seats and interpretation booths for the 2004 EU enlargement.

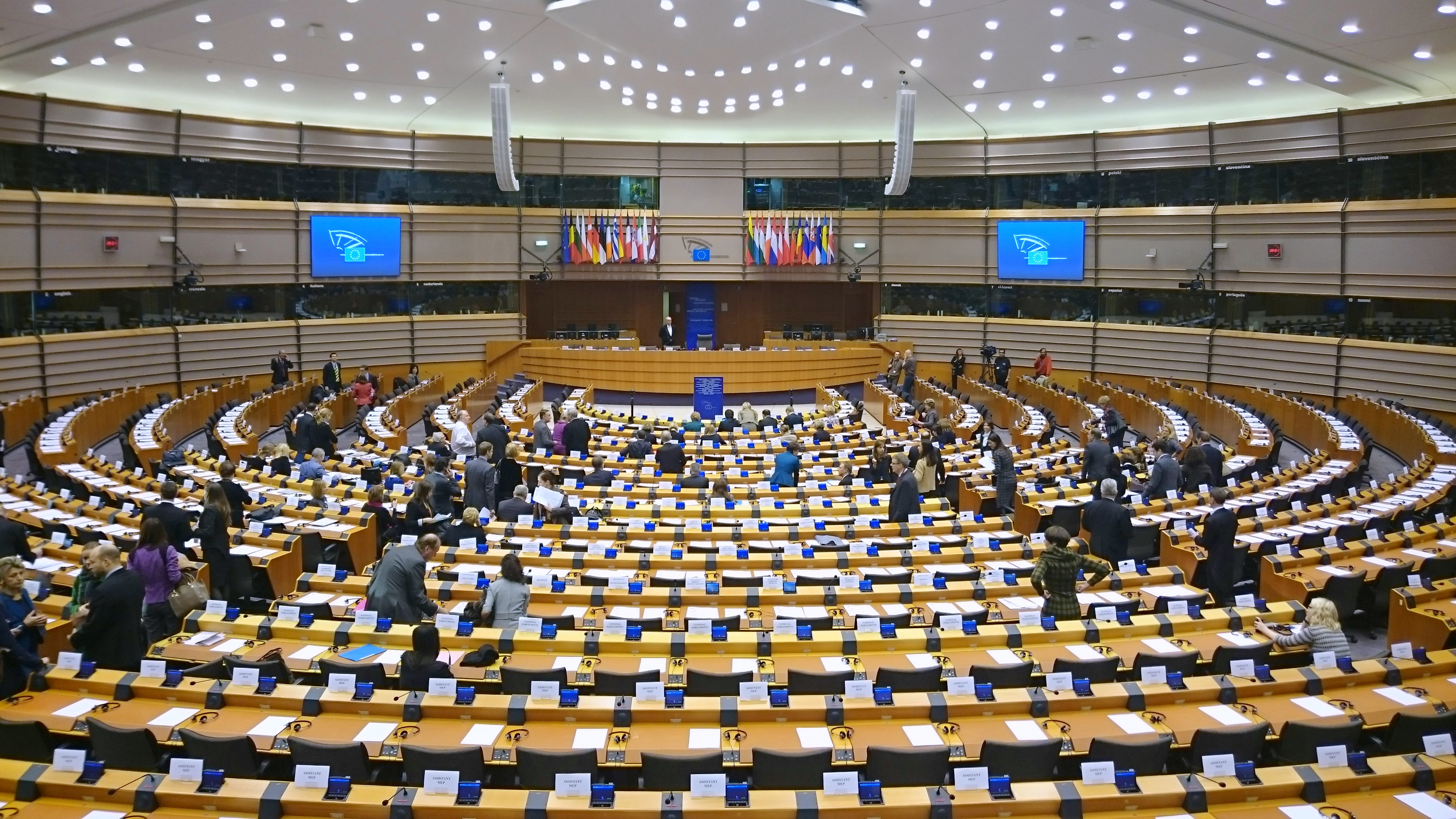
The hemicycle (debating chamber) of the European Parliament

== Visitors ==
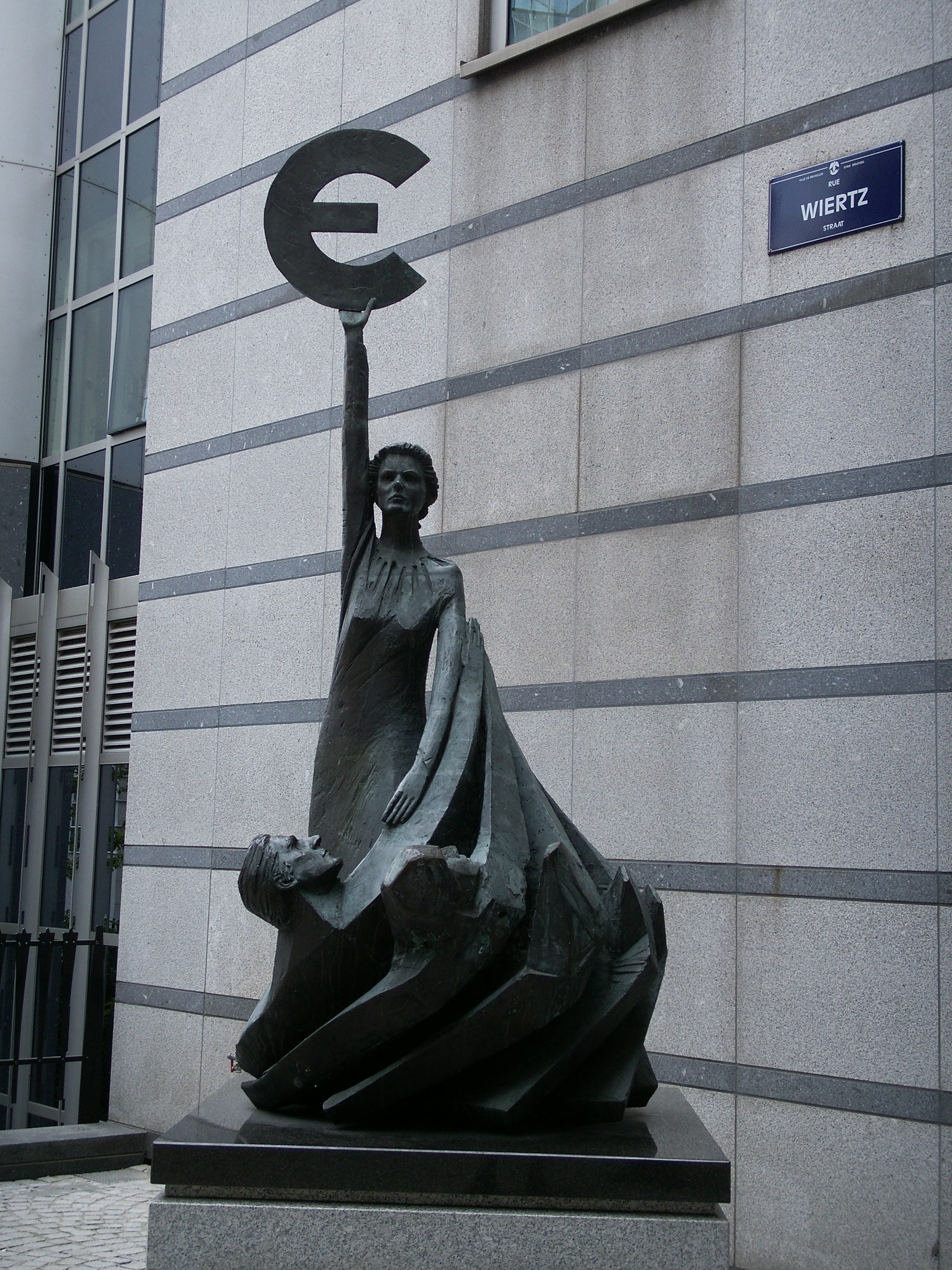
Europe, statue of Europa holding the Greek epsilon

The European Parliament, its committees and plenary meetings are open to the public. Free audio guided tours are offered when the European Parliament is not holding a plenary meeting. The buildings, containing several shops and banks, are largely open to the public and receive 15,000 people a day. The old station building houses the Belgian public information office on the European Parliament, and "infodoc", a specialised literary resource for academics and journalists. A more general public information resource is available at the "infopoint" on the esplanade side of the Spinelli building.

The ground floor of the Brandt building houses a visitors' centre on the ground floor, originally planned to open in time for the 2009 European election but it had been delayed by a year. With 6,000 m^{2} (65,000 sq ft) it will be the second largest parliamentary visitors centre in the world, modelled on the Swedish and Danish centres, with a state-of-the-art interactive role play allowing visitors to simulate the work of an MEP in a mock hemicycle – debating and passing legislation.

The original visitor's centre was opened in the 1990s and became too small to handle visitors. The new centre includes a cafeteria, shop, children's area and a "resource area" offering databases of detailed information. There is also a permanent exhibition on the European Parliament and Europe. Entry will be free and visitors will not have to gain passes or go through heavy security checks as they have to with the rest of the complex.

The European Parliament has also collected around 363 paintings and sculptures across its three sets of buildings which it has been purchasing as a pan-European cultural collection since 1979. Lidia Geringer de Oedenberg MEP, who is in charge of the European Parliament's art budget, plans to ensure the public have greater access by opening a 'tunnel of art' between the Espace Léopold and the Delors building. A museum of Europe will also be established in the Eastman building near the European Parliament in Leopold Park.

A long-standing statue outside the Paul-Henri Spaak building has become popular with tourists. The bronze statue, simply called Europe, was created by May Claerhout and is a representation of Europa, carried by a mass of people while also being a part of it. The figure carries an "E" or the Greek "ϵ", the symbol of the euro and as a sign of European unity. The statue was given to the European Parliament by the Belgian presidency of the EU on 20 December 1993.

== See also ==
- Parlamentarium
- Brussels and the European Union
- Seat of the European Parliament in Strasbourg
- European Parliament in Luxembourg
- Institutional seats of the European Union
