= Mall Road =

Mall Road may refer to:

- Mall Road, Lahore
- Mall Road, Shimla
- Mall Road, Manali
