= Mal Muslim =

Muslim group of India and Bangladesh

The Mal Muslims are a Muslim community found in north east India and Bangladesh. They are a Muslim converts from the Hindu Mal caste. The community is also known as Besati Mal or Churiwala. Mal Muslim are listed as Other Backward Classes by the Government of India and Government of West Bengal.

== Origin ==
The community is traditionally associated with selling bangles and other traditionally jewellery. Little is known about the circumstances of their conversion to Islam, although according to traditions took place some nine centuries ago. There relation to the Bisati community of North India is also unclear, although both groups are traditionally involved in peddling and hawking. The community is found mainly in the districts of Malda, Murshidabad, 24 Parganas, Midnapore, Birbhum and Howrah. They speak Bengali and belong to the Sunni sect of Islam. The Mal are also found in western Bangladesh.

== Present circumstances ==
The Besati Mal are a landless community, involved mainly in hawking. Smaller groups have taken to agriculture. The community buys its wares from Kolkata, and then sells in the local markets. The Mal Besati live in multi-caste villages, although they occupy their own quarters known as paras. They are strictly endogamous, but have so system of clans. Each settlement includes a panchayat or caste council, that deals with community issues.
