= Mal (name) =

Mal is a masculine given name, often a short form (hypocorism) of Malcolm and other names. People so named include:

== Mal ==
- Mal mac Rochride, a 2nd-century Irish king
- Mal Hallett (1893-1952), American jazz violinist and bandleader
- Mal Moore (1939-2013), American college football player, coach and director of athletics
- Mal Young (born 1957), British television producer, script writer and executive producer
- Mal Walden (born 1945), Australian former journalist and television news presenter
- Mal Webb (born 1966), Australian musician

== Malcolm ==
- Mal Anderson (1935–2026), Australian tennis player
- Mal Aspey (born 1947), English rugby league footballer and coach
- Mal Atwell (born 1937), Australian rules football player and coach
- Mal Brough (born 1961), Australian politician
- Mal Brown (born 1946), Australian rules football player and coach
- Mal Bryce (born 1943), former Deputy Premier of Western Australia
- Mal Cochrane (born 1961), Indigenous Australian professional rugby league footballer
- Mal Davis (born 1956), Canadian National Hockey League former player
- Malcolm Douglas (documentary maker) (1941–2010), Australian filmmaker and crocodile hunter
- Mal Eason (1879–1970), American Major League Baseball pitcher
- Mal Evans (1935–1976), roadie and friend of the Beatles
- Malcolm Fraser (1930–2015), Australian Prime Minister
- Mal Graham (born 1945), American National Basketball Association player
- Mal Hammack (1933–2004), American National Football League running back
- Malcolm Hancock (1936–1993), American magazine cartoonist
- Malcolm Kutner (1921–2005), American National Football League player
- Malcolm McEachern (1883–1945), Australian opera singer
- Mal Meninga (born 1960), Australian rugby league player and coach
- Mal Michael (born 1977), Australian rules footballer from Papua New Guinea
- Malcolm Milne (born 1948), Australian skier
- Mal Peet (1947–2015), English author and illustrator best known for young-adult fiction
- Malcolm Spence (Jamaican athlete) (1936–2017), Jamaican sprinter
- Malcolm St. Clair (filmmaker) (1897–1952), Hollywood film director, writer, producer and actor
- Malcolm Turnbull (born 1954), Australian Prime Minister (2015–2018)
- Mal Waldron (1925–2002), American jazz pianist, composer and arranger
- Mal Washer (born 1945), Australian politician

== Malachy ==
- Mal Donaghy (born 1957), former footballer from Northern Ireland
- Mal Loye (born 1972), English cricketer

== Other ==
- Malupo Kaufusi (born 1979), former rugby league footballer
- Maldwyn "Mal" Pope (born 1960), Welsh musician and composer
- MaliVai Washington (born 1969), American retired tennis player
- Malvin "Mal" Whitfield (born 1924-2015), American 400 and 800 metre runner and three time Olympic champion
- Mal or Malhun Hatun (died 1323), wife of Osman I, founder of the dynasty that established and ruled the Ottoman Empire
