= Mall Plaza =

Mall plaza may mean:

- A plaza or public square in a pedestrian mall or shopping mall
- Various shopping malls with “Mall Plaza” in the name
- Mallplaza, a chain of shopping malls in South America
