= Mal (caste) =

Hindu caste found in the states of West Bengal and Jharkhand

- Religions: Hinduism
- Languages: Bengali, Assamese, Maithili, Hindi
- Populated states: West Bengal, Jharkhand, Bangladesh
- Population: 204,775 (West Bengal, 1981 census); 273,641 (West Bengal, 2001 census); 306,234 (West Bengal, 2011 census)

The Mal is a Hindu caste found in the state of West Bengal and Jharkhand.

The term Mal is derived from Malla, meaning wrestlers or soldiers.

Paharia Mal or Mal Paharia is considered as Scheduled Tribe while the other Mal groups are considered as Scheduled Castes by the Government of West Bengal.

== Demographics ==
The Mal are primarily concentrated in Birbhum district and are also found throughout West Bengal, except in Purulia district. Mal numbered 273,641 in the 2001 census and were 1.5 per cent of the total Scheduled Caste population of West Bengal. 39.6 per cent of the Mal were literate - 51.9 per cent males and 26.8 per cent females were literate. Bengali language is their mother tongue, and they use the Bengali script for writing. Bengali is also used for inter-group communication.

== Divisions ==
The Mal have four subgroups, the Raja Mal, Chhatradhari Mal, Sapure Mal and Paharia Mal. The Mal subgroups are differentiated primarily by occupation. The Chatradhari traditionally serve by holding umbrellas during marriage ceremonies, while the Supuria are snake charmers. The Pharia earn their livelihood by selling firewood, and the Raja Mal are primarily agricultural labourers. The Mal belong to a single gotra, Kashyap, and commonly use the surnames Mal or Das. They avoid marriage within the same pitrikul for up to seven ascending generations and also avoid marriage with their mother's immediate kin. Among Mal women, traditional symbols of Bengali Hindu marriage include conch-shell and iron bangles (shankha-pola) and vermilion (sindoor).

== See also ==
- Mal Muslim

== Further readings ==
- Dasgupta, Gautam Kumar; Biswas, Samira; Mallik, Rabiranjan (2009), Heritage Tourism: An Anthropological Journey to Bishnupur, A Mittal Publication, p. 19, ISBN 978-8183242943
