= Mall of Arabia =

Mall of Arabia may refer to:

- Mall of Arabia (Jeddah), Jeddah, Saudi Arabia
- Mall of Arabia (Dubai), Dubai, United Arab Emirates
