= Esplanade of the European Parliament =

Pedestrian mall in Brussels, Belgium

Esplanade of the European Parliament The Mall
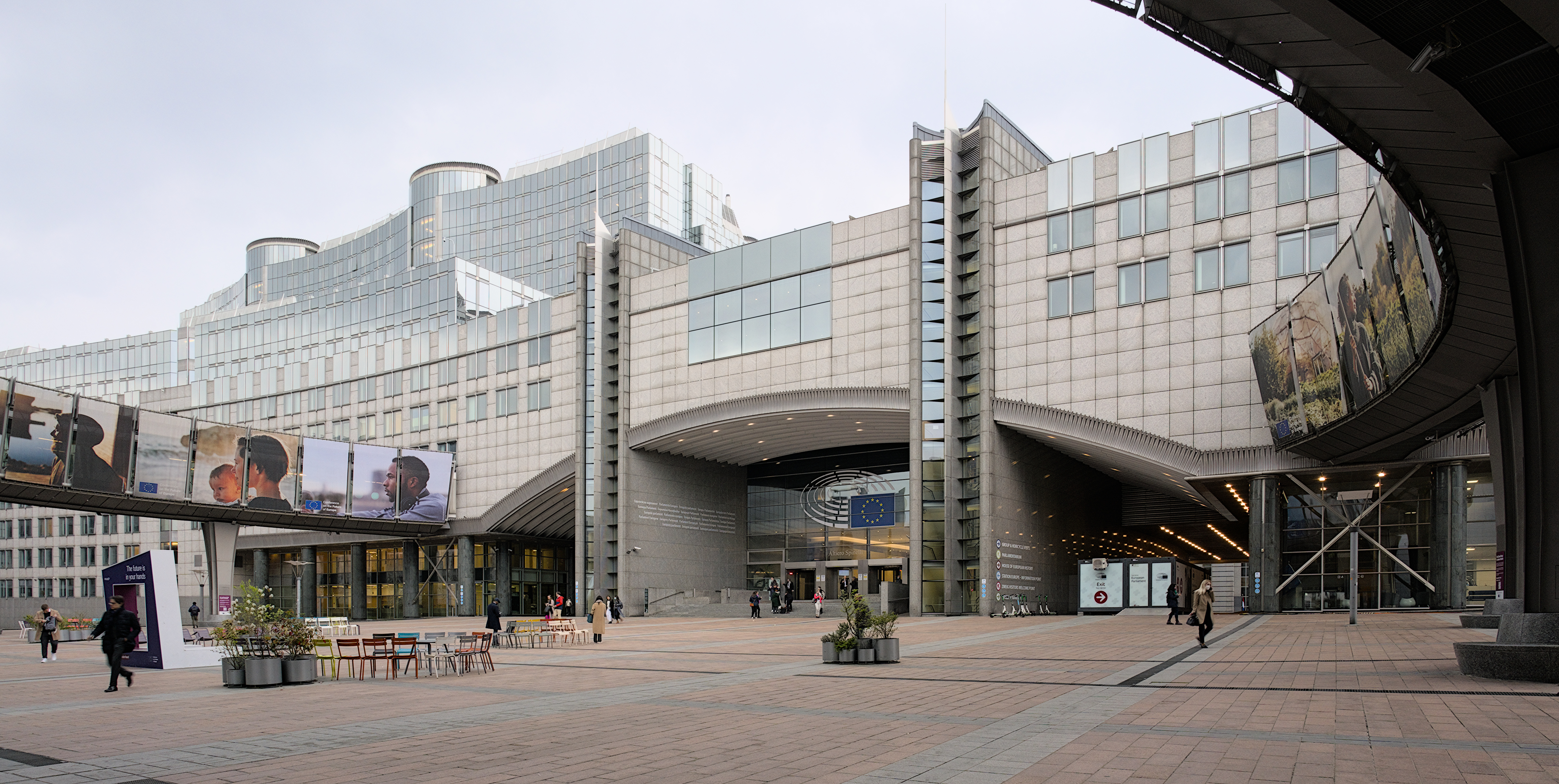
- Altiero Spinelli building seen from the Simone Veil Agora (part of the Mall)

- Location within Brussels Location within Belgium
- Namesake: European Parliament
- Type: Esplanade
- Location: City of Brussels, Brussels-Capital Region, Belgium
- Quarter: Leopold Quarter
- Postal code: 1047
- Coordinates: 50°50′20″N 4°22′26″E

Construction
- Completion: 2002

The Esplanade of the European Parliament (French: Esplanade du Parlement européen; Dutch: Esplanade van het Europees Parlement), or simply the Mall, is a pedestrian mall in Brussels, Belgium, completed in 2002. Its most representative parts are the Solidarność 1980 Esplanade and the Simone Veil Agora. It is served by Brussels-Luxembourg railway station.

== Position ==
The Mall runs the central length of the Espace Léopold (the European Parliament buildings in Brussels), with the Alterio Spinelli building to the east and the Willy Brandt and József Antall buildings to the west, joined to the former by the circular Konrad Adenauer footbridge running over the Mall. The former Brussels-Luxembourg railway station building (see below) has been converted into an information centre and fronts onto the Place du Luxembourg/Luxemburgplein.

The Mall itself covers a once over-ground railway station, Brussels-Luxembourg railway station (formerly known as Leopold Quarter railway station). The paving over the top of the station allowed the construction of the European Parliament and created a direct link between the Place du Luxembourg to the west and Leopold Park to the east. The station's old entrance, since converted into part of the parliamentary complex, is replaced by a glass covered stairway rising out of the Mall's southern portion. The far south end is flanked by low-rise apartment blocks and is adjacent to local museums.

=== Criticism ===
The Mall has been criticised for "leading nowhere" as, aside from the European Parliament and railway station, it is devoid of life. Parliamentary authorities did not wish to share the site with private enterprise, primarily for security reasons, and hence there are no shops or services along its entire length. There are plans to extend it along the railway tracks to the north, meeting up with the Berlaymont building on the Rue de la Loi/Wetstraat and to the south, i.e. the European Commission's extra 'pole' of buildings in Auderghem. However, residential opposition and delays mean this is not likely and it was not included as an option in recent architectural competitions.

== Design ==
The Mall is largely light pink and white flagstone, with the southern segment broken by grassy areas running down its centre. It curves following the layout of the train station below and the parliamentary buildings above built around the tracks. In the stone in the northern segment are engraved marble slabs in the ground commemorating the first meeting of the World Day to Overcome Extreme Poverty on 17 October 1987 in Paris. They are written in four languages and contains a quote from the French priest and humanitarian activist Joseph Wresinski and a commemoration of the 29 May 2002 follow-up meeting in Brussels.

In the re-planning of the European Quarter, the "public stature" of the Mall is to be reinforced, along with the east-west connections. The northern end, which cuts off suddenly at the Rue Belliard/Belliardstraat, is to be improved, subject to an architectural competition. The southern segment will also be improved with better connections to residences, the park and the local museums. The Brussels government also seeks ideas on how to bring more life to the Mall.

== Name ==
According to the Brussels government, the term the Mall, translated from the French le Mail, was given by the designers in reference to the game of mail (a form of croquet) that was played in 16th-century France on a raised grassy valley adjoining the Tuileries Palace Gardens. The proximity of Leopold Park to the esplanade, which was originally higher, led the designers to apply the term.

The central and most representative part of the Mall was named the Solidarność 1980 Esplanade and runs parallel to the Rue de Trèves/Trierstraat between the Chaussée de Wavre/Steenweg op Waver and the Rue Belliard. This alludes to the Solidarność trade union and social movement, which is a symbol of the fight against the Iron Curtain because it played a central role in bringing Poland's suppressive Communist regime to an end in 1989. The central part of the esplanade between the Altiero Spinelli building and Place du Luxembourg was named the Simone Veil Agora in honour of the French politician Simone Veil, a former president of the European Parliament and survivor from the Auschwitz-Birkenau concentration camp.

== Events ==
On 3 June 2010, the Belgian presidency of the Council of the European Union arranged a dance event, show and concert on the Esplanade and the Place du Luxembourg, inviting members of the public. Among the artists performing on the stage erected on the Agora of Solidarity were Brian Molko, Stromae and Sandra Kim. The celebration, themed "I ♥ EU" (pronounced "I love you"), ended with a fireworks display and a "late-night after party hosted by a top DJ". Belgian television broadcast the event, which also was available through the Eurovision network and on the presidency's website.

== Gallery ==
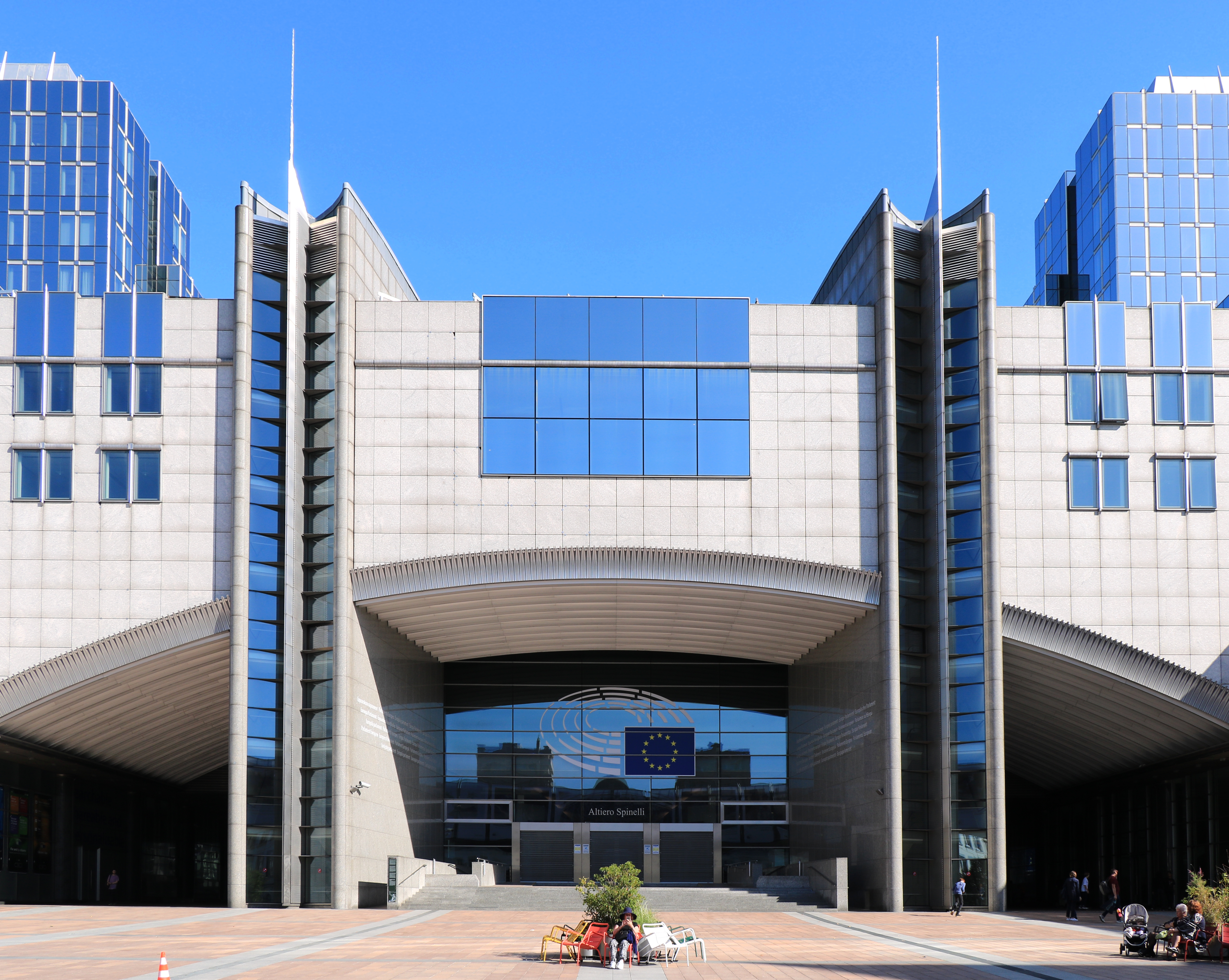
Entrance to the Spinelli building at the Mall's centre (part of Simone Veil Agora)

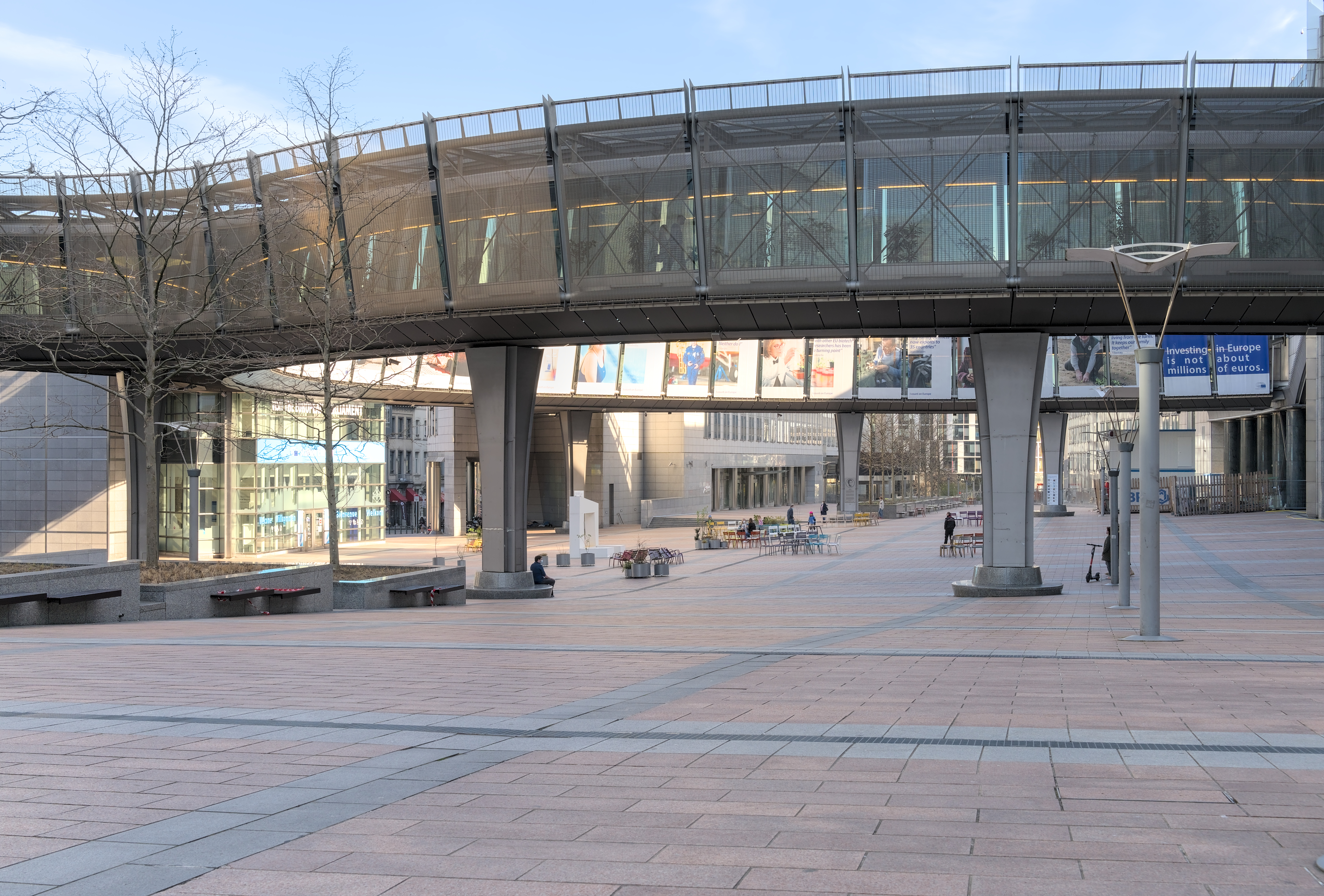
The circular Konrad Adenauer footbridge (part of Simone Veil Agora)

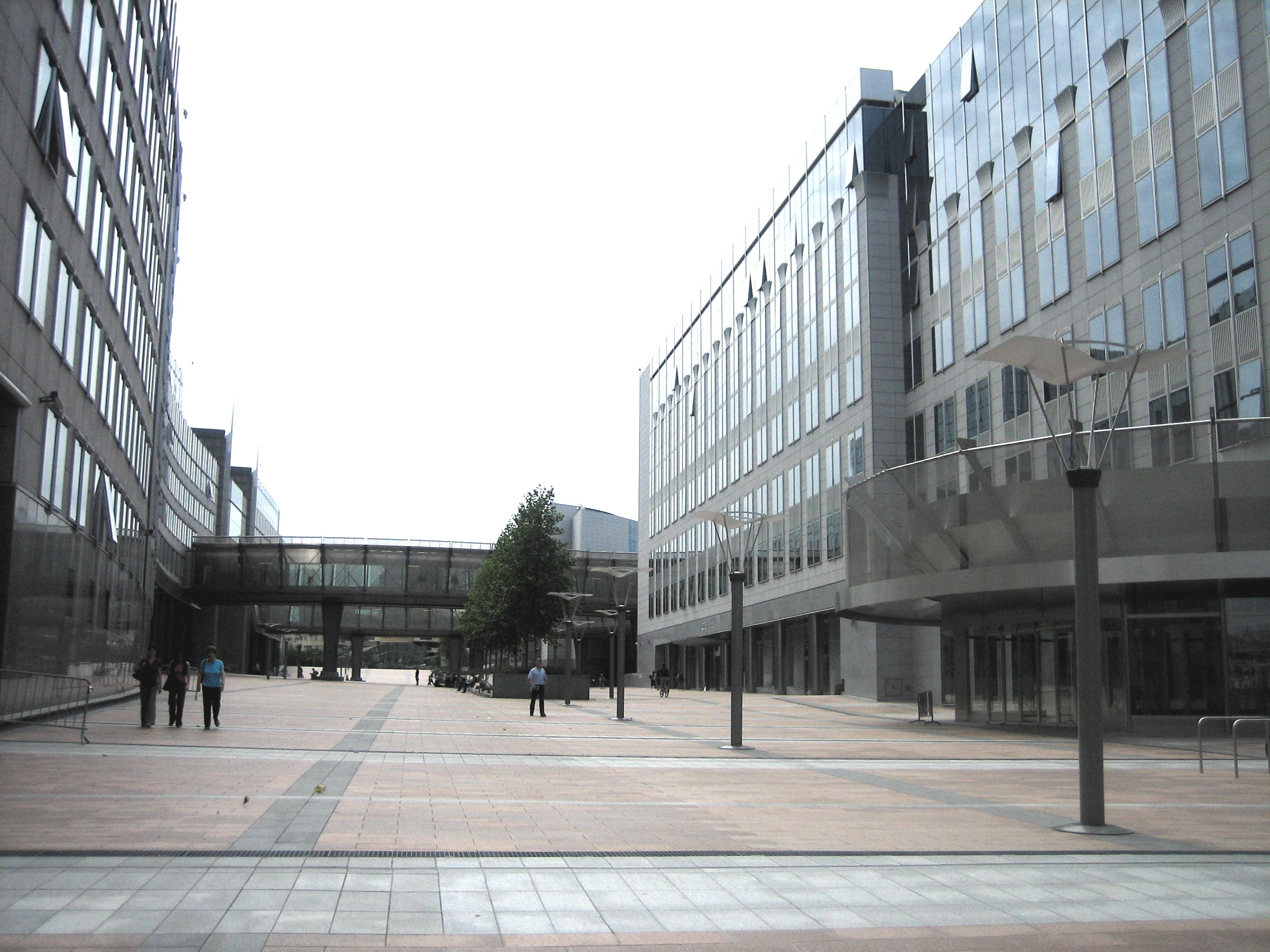
The Brandt building (right), looking south (part of Solidarność 1980 Esplanade)

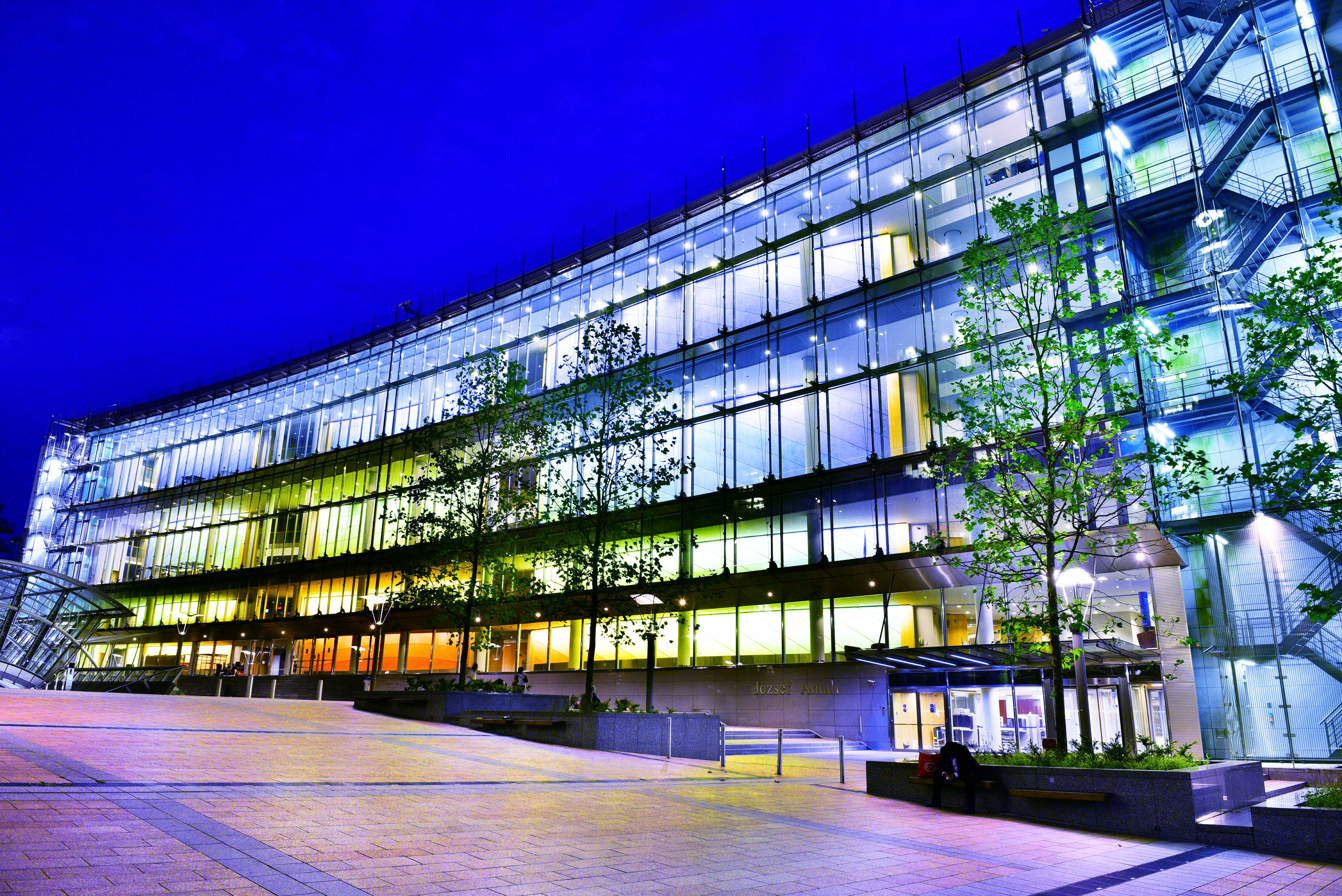
The Antall building in winter, looking south (part of Solidarność 1980 Esplanade)

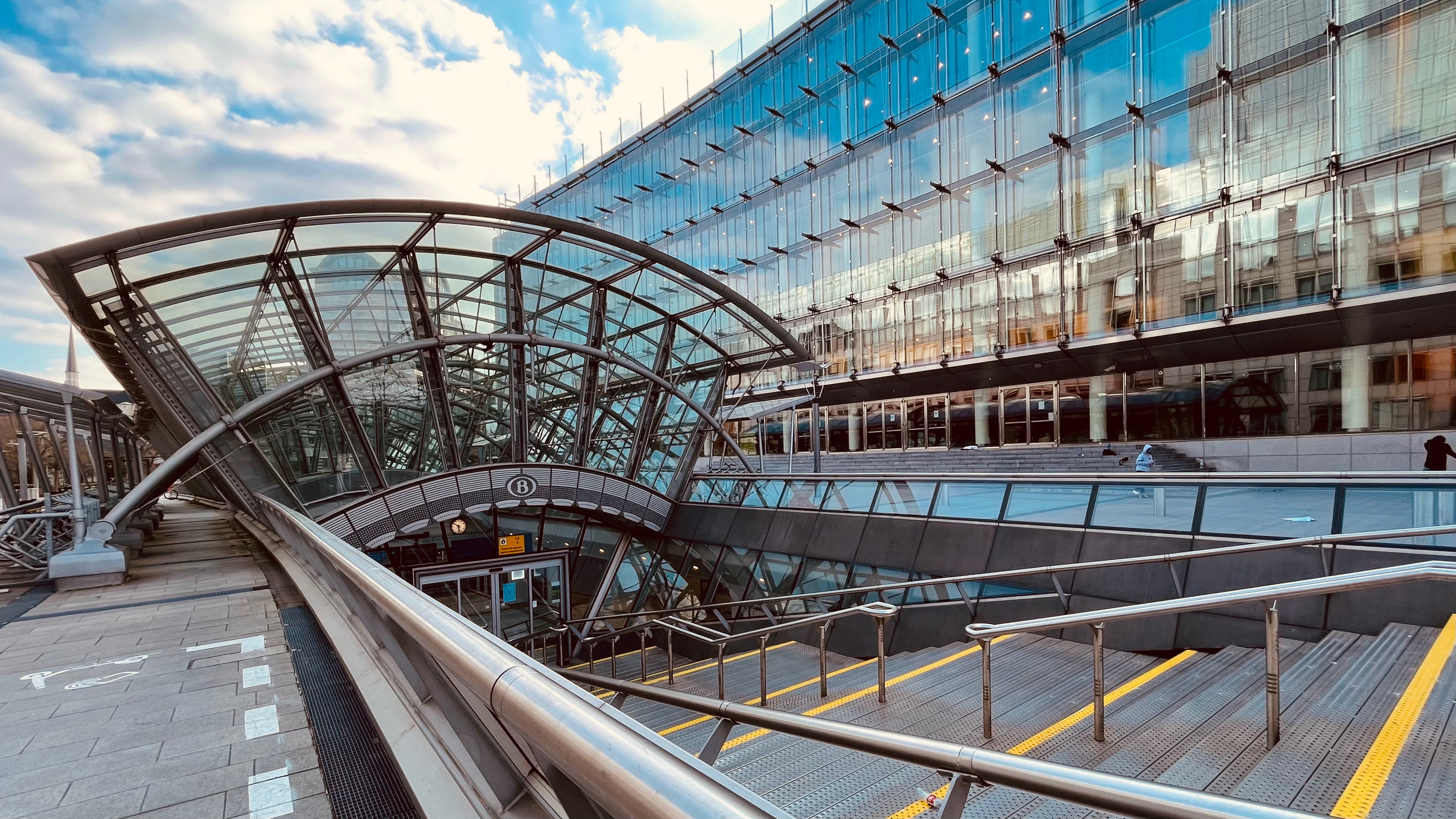
Entrance to Brussels-Luxembourg railway station (part of Solidarność 1980 Esplanade)

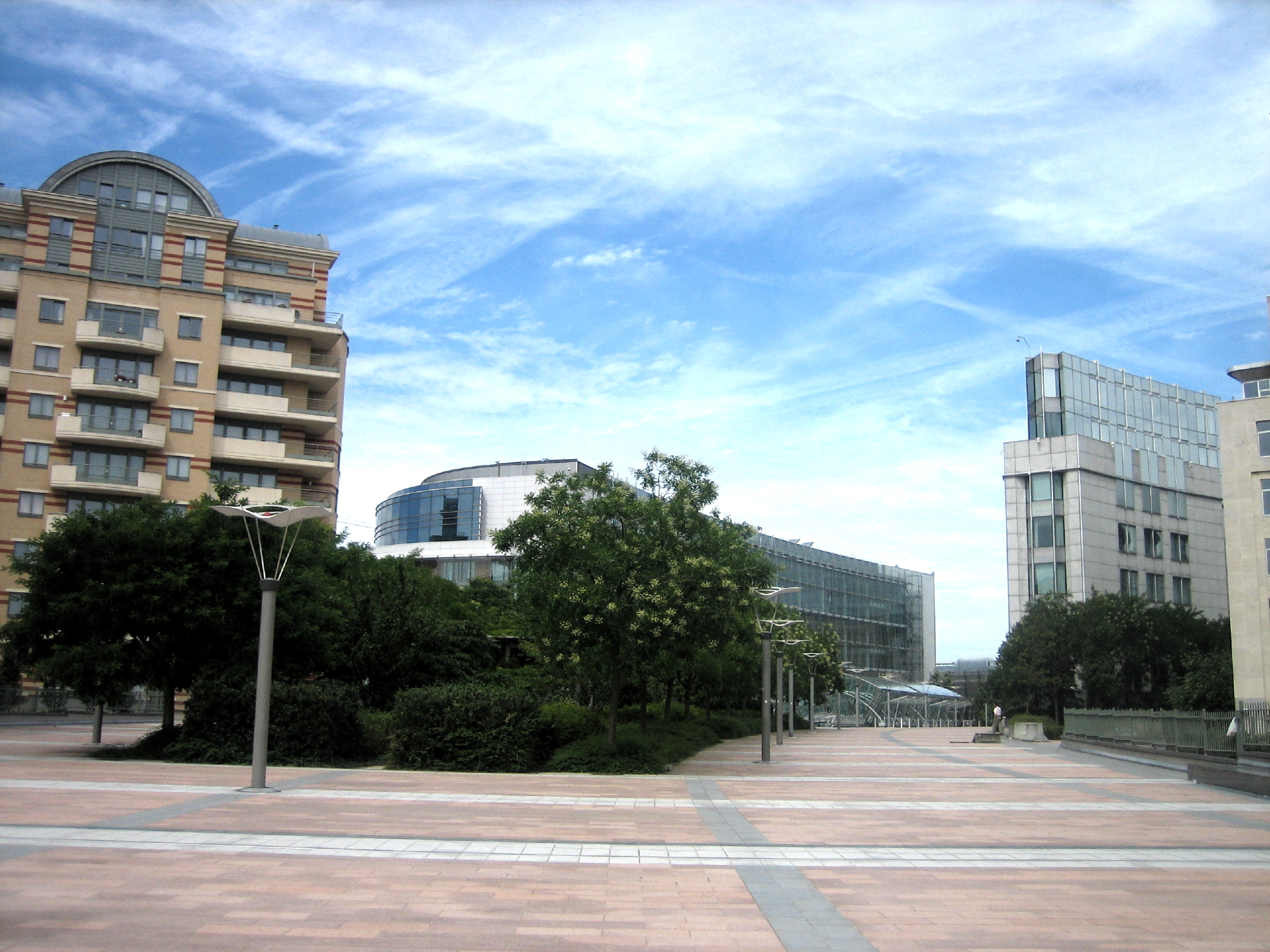
The southern segment of the Mall, looking north

== See also ==
- Parlamentarium
- Brussels and the European Union
- Institutional seats of the European Union
