= MALL =

Protein-coding gene in the species Homo sapiens

Identifiers
- Aliases: MALL, BENE, mal, T-cell differentiation protein like, mal, T cell differentiation protein like
- External IDs: OMIM: 602022; MGI: 2385152; GeneCards: MALL

Gene location (Human)
Chr.	Chromosome 2 (human)
Band	2q13	Start	110,083,870 bp
Band	2q13	End	110,116,022 bp

Gene location (Mouse)
Chr.	Chromosome 2 (mouse)
Band	2|2 F1	Start	127,546,306 bp
Band	2|2 F1	End	127,571,852 bp
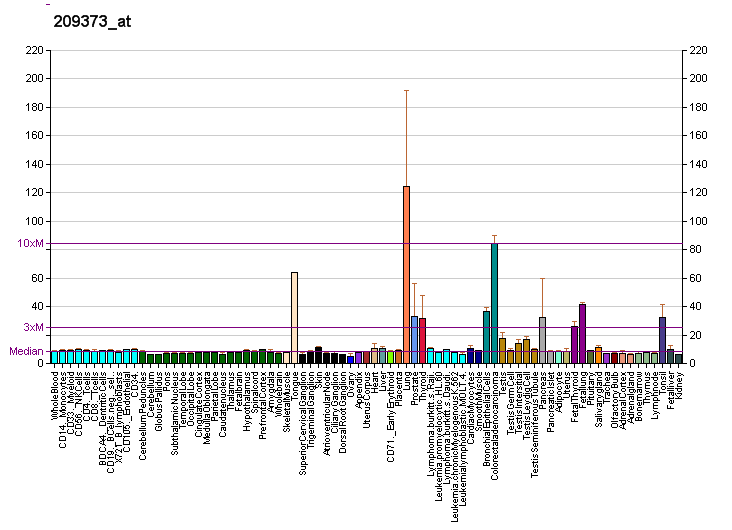
RNA expression pattern
Bgee	Human / Mouse (ortholog); Top expressed in: duodenum; mucosa of transverse colon; epithelium of bronchus; rectum; vagina; skin of leg; upper lobe of left lung; skin of abdomen; islet of Langerhans; tonsil / Top expressed in: esophagus; intestinal villus; duodenum; ileum; jejunum; lip; conjunctival fornix; large intestine; colon; left colon; More reference expression data
BioGPS	More reference expression data
Gene ontology
Molecular function	protein binding; structural constituent of myelin sheath
Cellular component	Golgi membrane; clathrin-coated vesicle; plasma membrane; membrane; membrane raft; integral component of membrane; cytoplasmic vesicle
Biological process	cholesterol homeostasis; membrane raft polarization; protein localization; myelination
Sources:Amigo / QuickGO
Orthologs
Databases	NCBI: entry; OMA: entry
Species	Human	Mouse
Entrez	7851	228576
Ensembl	ENSG00000144063	ENSMUSG00000027377
UniProt	Q13021	Q91X49
RefSeq (mRNA)	NM_005434; NM_001371559; NM_001371560	NM_145532
RefSeq (protein)	NP_005425; NP_001358488; NP_001358489	NP_663507
Location (UCSC)	Chr 2: 110.08 – 110.12 Mb	Chr 2: 127.55 – 127.57 Mb
PubMed search
- Wikidata
View/Edit Human	View/Edit Mouse

MAL-like protein is a protein that in humans is encoded by the MALL gene.

This gene encodes an element of the machinery for raft-mediated trafficking in endothelial cells. The encoded protein, a member of the MAL proteolipid family, predominantly localizes in glycolipid-enriched membrane (GEM) and cholesterol-enriched membrane rafts. It interacts with caveolin-1.
