= Chancery =

Chancery may refer to:

== Offices and administration ==
- Court of Chancery, the chief court of equity in England and Wales until 1873
  - Equity (law), also called chancery, the body of jurisprudence originating in the Court of Chancery
  - Courts of equity, also called chancery courts
- Chancery (diplomacy), the principal office that houses a diplomatic mission or an embassy
- Chancery (medieval office), responsible for the production of official documents
- Chancery (Scotland), the keeper of the Quarter Seal, a senior position in the legal system of Scotland
- Diocesan chancery, administration branch in the official government of a Catholic or Anglican diocese
- Apostolic Chancery, an office of the Roman Curia

== Writing and printing ==
- Chancery Standard, of Late Middle English writing
- Chancery hand, either of two distinct styles of historical handwriting
- ITC Zapf Chancery, a family of typefaces

== Other uses ==
- Chancery, Ceredigion, a village in Wales
- the name of several professional wrestling holds

== See also ==
- Chancellery (disambiguation)
- Central Chancery of the Orders of Knighthood, British office that deals with administration of Orders of Chivalry
- Court of Chancery (disambiguation), several uses
