= Federal Public Service Chancellery of the Prime Minister =

The Federal Public Service (FPS) Chancellery of the Prime Minister is a Belgian Federal Public Service established by Royal Decree^{1} on 15 May 2001. It assists the Prime Minister with preparing, coordinating and implementing government policy.

The FPS Chancellery provides information on the policy decisions made by the government and fosters Belgium's image worldwide.

The current President of the Management Board is Arlin Bagdat, who took up the role since 1 Mai 2024.

== History ==
The Prime Minister's Office was established in 1918, when the title 'Prime Minister' was first used in a Belgian context. In 2001, it was turned into a Federal Public Service (FPS) as part of the so-called Copernicus Plan to modernise the federal administration. Initially called the 'FPS Chancellery and General Services', it was renamed the 'FPS Chancellery of the Prime Minister' in 2002.

16 Rue de la Loi has been the official headquarters of the Belgian government since 1944. The epicentre of Belgian politics, this building is home to the Prime Minister's policy unit (private office) and administrative personnel (FPS Chancellery) and also hosts the Council of Ministers' weekly meetings as well as federal government press conferences.

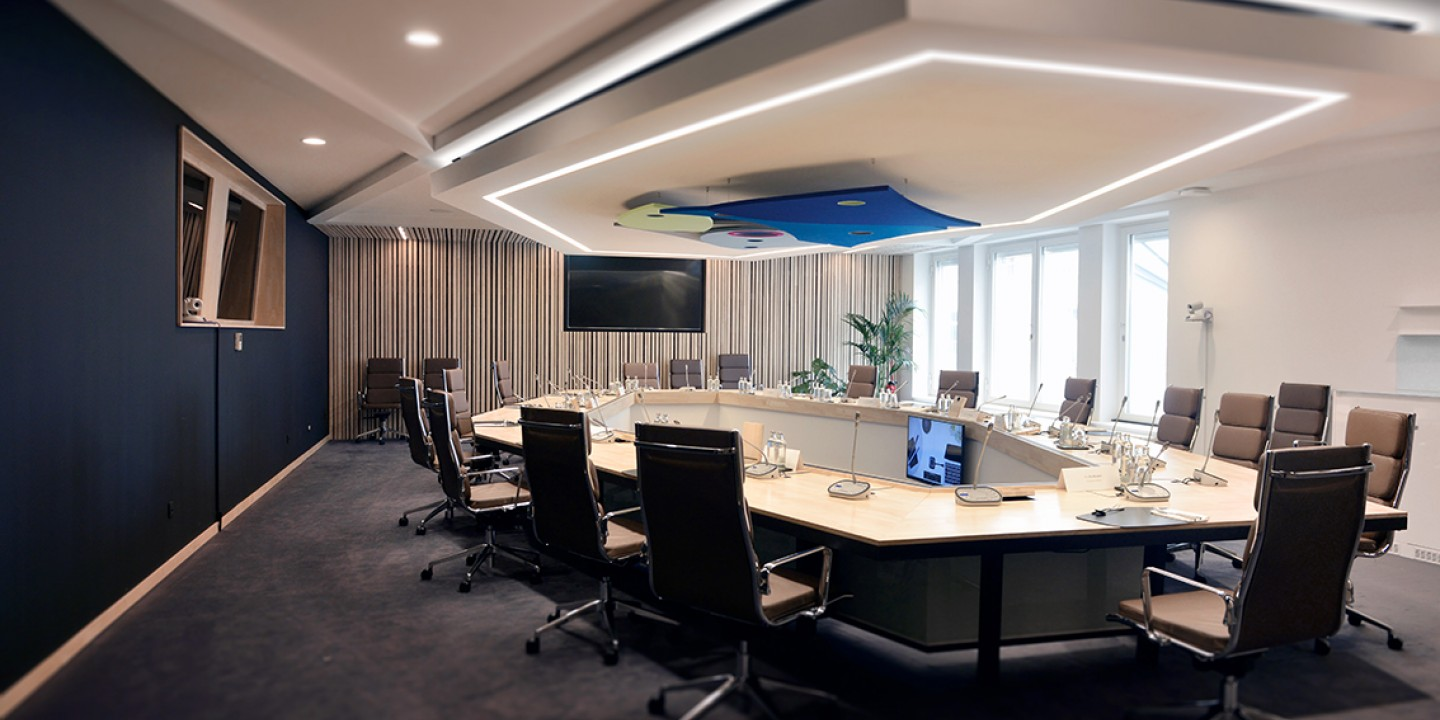
The Council of Ministers Room, known as the Marie Popelin Room

== Missions ==
The FPS Chancellery of the Prime Minister has the following missions:

- managing the administrative and logistical tasks involved in preparing and following up on meetings of the Council of Ministers
- supporting the Prime Minister in their work on the coordination and federal and interfederal integration of policy and in their role as a member of the European Council
- supporting communications for the Prime Minister, federal government and federal institutions, with a view to informing the public and communicating the decisions and actions/initiatives of public authorities through various interactive channels aimed at citizens, journalists, associations and businesses
- enhancing Belgium's reputation through communication initiatives carried out in synergy and collaboration with Belgian, European and international partners
- overseeing three federal cultural institutions: the Royal Theatre of La Monnaie (Théâtre Royal de la Monnaie), the Centre for Fine Arts, Brussels and the Belgian National Orchestra
- providing administrative and logistical support to entities established at the Chancellery, namely the Federal Institute for Sustainable Development (IFDD–FIDO or FISD), the Centre for Cybersecurity Belgium (CCB), the Permanent National Commission for the Cultural Pact and the Audit Committee of the Federal Authorities (ACFA)
- planning credits and projects for Belgium's Host Nation Policy (HNP), under which the Belgian State acts as the host nation for international organisations

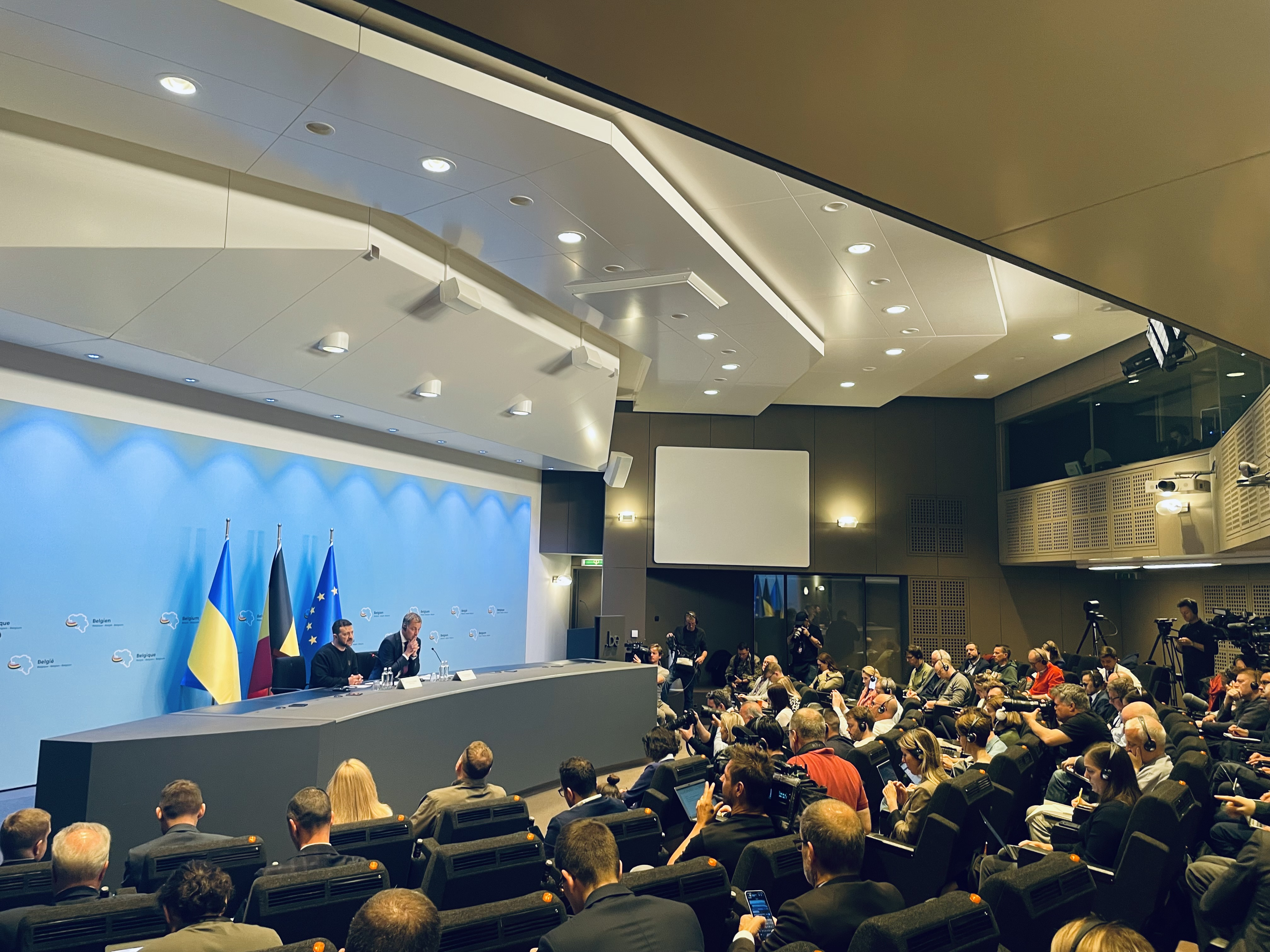
The press room during a visit by Ukrainian President Volodymyr Zelenskyy, May 2024

In this connection, the FPS also provides many services to the other federal institutions and to the federal government, such as running information campaigns, delivering cross-functional IT support, registering domain names, providing a platform for posting press releases, organising events and official ceremonies, coordinating public procurement legislation and hiring out conference rooms and facilities at the Résidence Palace – International Press Centre and the Château of Val-Duchesse.

== Values ==
Besides the core values of the ethical framework applying to all federal government personnel, the Chancellery espouses its own values of flexibility, excellence and trust.

== Structure ==
The FPS Chancellery comprises two operational directorates-general (DGs): DG Secretariats & Coordination and DG External Communication. It has a number of support services: ICT, Translation, Personnel & Organisation, Budget & Management Control, and Secretariat & Logistics. These also assist the entities falling under the aegis of the Chancellery, as well as the federal cultural institutions and HNP.

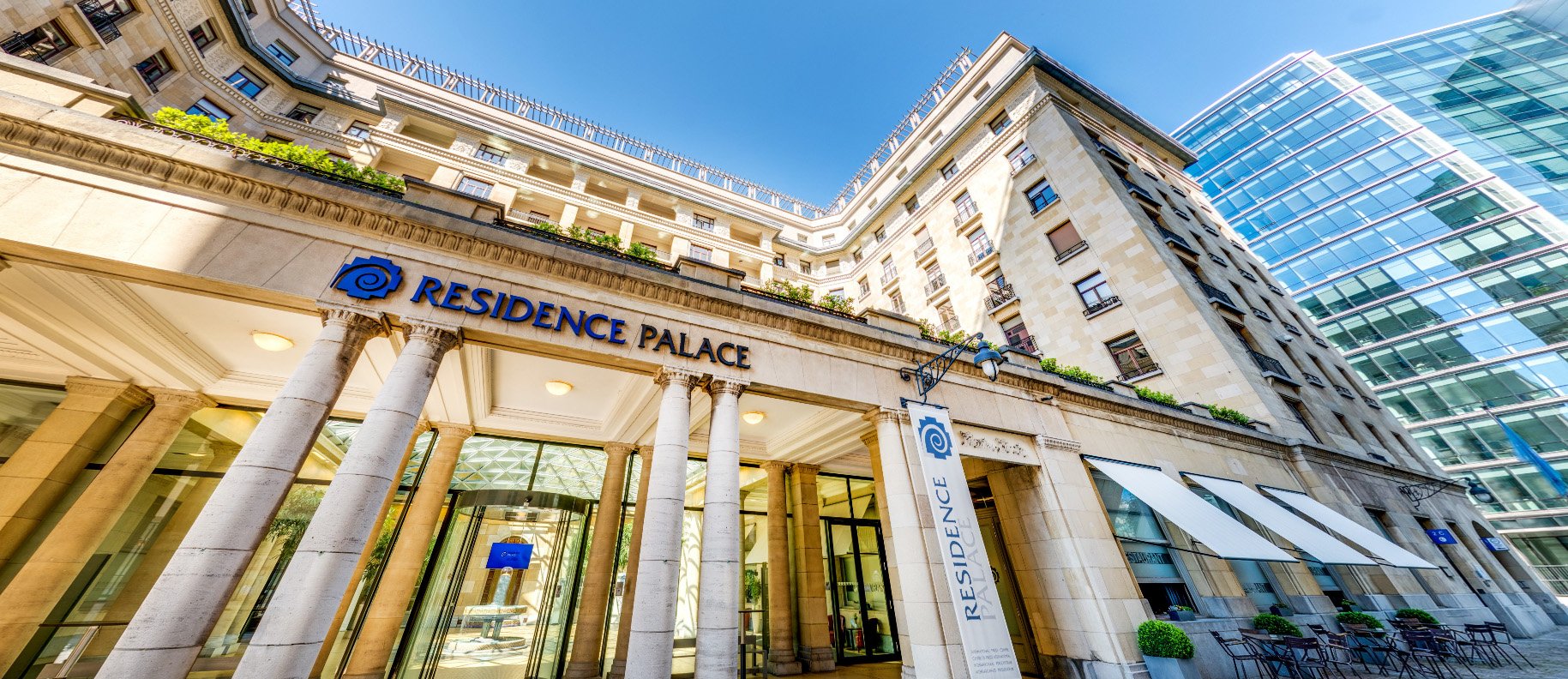
The entrance to the Résidence Palace, home to the International Press Centre

== Notes and references ==
^{1} Royal Decree of 15 May 2001 establishing the Federal Public Service Chancellery and General Services (in French and Dutch)

== See also ==
- Prime Minister of Belgium
- List of prime ministers of Belgium
