= FISD =

FISD is an acronym that may refer to:

- Federal Investigative Services Division, a part of the United States Office of Personnel Management, does background checks for military and civilian positions requiring security clearance
- Independent School Districts in Texas - F
- Financial Information Services Division of Software and Information Industry Association
- Federal Institute for Sustainable Development
