= Chancellery =

Chancellery is the office of the chancellor, sometimes also referred to as the chancery.

Both terms may also refer to:

== Government ==
=== Austria ===
- Presidential Chancellery (Austria)
- Federal Chancellery (Austria)

=== Germany ===
- German Chancellery, the office and department of the Chancellor of Germany
  - Federal Chancellery (Bonn)
  - Federal Chancellery (Berlin)
- German Chancery, office of the Privy Council of Hanover in the 18th and 19th century
- Hitler's Chancellery (Kanzlei des Führers), the personal chancellery of Adolf Hitler responsible for Hitler's personal affairs and requests made to Hitler directly.
- Nazi Party Chancellery, an office of Nazi Germany in the 20th century
- Reich Chancellery, the building in Berlin housing the Chancellor of Germany and other administrative offices of Germany during the German Empire, Weimar Republic and Third Reich periods

=== Poland ===
- Chancellery of the President of the Republic of Poland
- Chancellery of the Prime Minister of Poland
- Royal Chancellery of the Polish–Lithuanian Commonwealth from the 16th to 18th centuries

=== Other government ===
- Chancellery (medieval office) or chancery, a medieval European writing office
- Department of Chancellery, one of the three central government departments in imperial China between the 3rd and 13th centuries
- Federal Chancellery of Switzerland
- Federal Public Service Chancellery of the Prime Minister, the office and department of the Prime Minister of Belgium
- Garde des Sceaux, i.e., keeper of the seals, or Chancellory, the French Ministry of Justice
- His Imperial Majesty's Own Chancellery, an office in the 19th century Russian Empire, known for its secret department:
  - Third Section of His Imperial Majesty's Own Chancellery
- Real Audiencia y Chancillería de Valladolid, the court of last resort of the Crown of Castile (Spain)

== Other uses ==
- Chancellory of Scotland, abolished in 1928
- Chancellery, a type of grappling hold also referred to as a headlock
- Chancellery of Honours, an office in the Canadian Heraldic Authority, part of the Canadian honours system

== See also ==
- Chancery (disambiguation)
