= Berlaymont building =

Seat of the European Commission in Brussels, Belgium

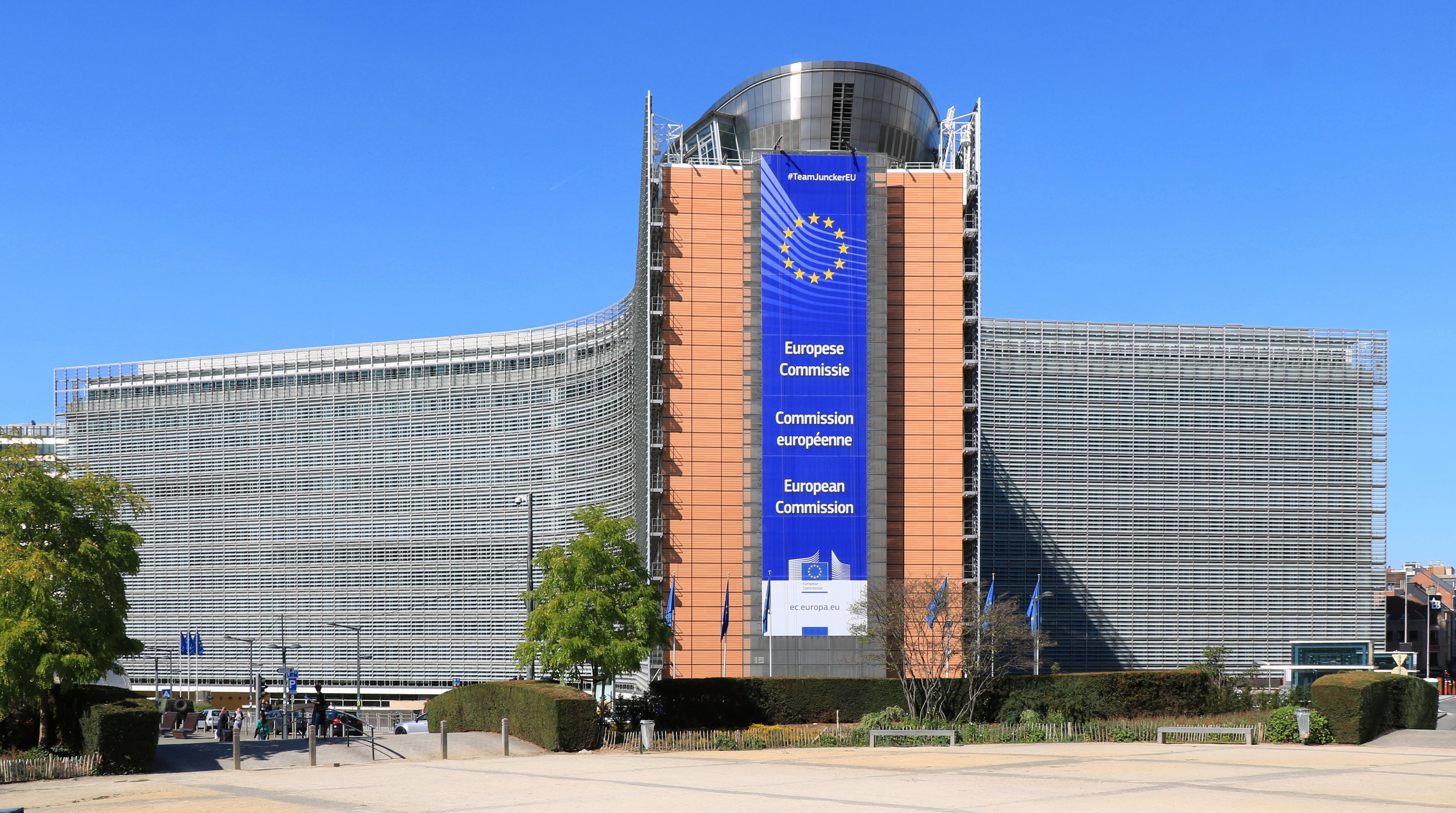
- The Berlaymont building in Brussels, seen from the Robert Schuman Roundabout

General information
- Type: Government offices
- Architectural style: Modernist
- Location: Rue de la Loi / Wetstraat 200, 1049 City of Brussels, Brussels-Capital Region, Belgium
- Coordinates: 50°50′37.32″N 4°22′57.58″E
- Current tenants: Ursula von der Leyen (President of the European Commission)
- Construction started: 1963
- Completed: 1969
- Owner: European Commission
- Landlord: S.A. Berlaymont 2000

Technical details
- Floor count: 14
- Floor area: 240,500 m^{2} (2,589,000 sq ft)

Design and construction
- Architects: Lucien De Vestel with; Jean Gilson, André Polak and Jean Polak
- Structural engineer: Joris Schmidt

The Berlaymont building, or simply the Berlaymont (French pronunciation: [bɛʁlɛmɔ̃]), is an office building in Brussels, Belgium, which houses the headquarters of the European Commission, the executive branch of the European Union (EU). The structure is located on the Robert Schuman Roundabout at 200, rue de la Loi/Wetstraat, in the European Quarter. The unique form of the Berlaymont's architecture is used in the European Commission's official emblem. The building is named after the former Convent of the Ladies of Berlaymont, which occupied the site.

== Usage ==
The building has housed the European Commission since its construction, and has become a symbol of the European presence in Brussels and a metonym for the EU's executive power. The European Commission itself is spread over some 60-odd buildings, but the Berlaymont is the European Commission's headquarters, being the seat of the president of the European Commission and its College of Commissioners.

The following Directorates-General (departments) are also based in the Berlaymont: Human Resources and Security (HR), European Political Strategy Centre, formerly known as Bureau of European Policy Advisers (BEPA), Communication (COMM), Brussels Office of Infrastructure and Logistics (OIB), Secretariat-General (SG) and Legal Service (SJ).

The office of the president, the European Commission, and the boardroom, are on the 13th floor, together with the meeting room of the "Hebdo", as well as the restaurant La Convivialité.

Ursula von der Leyen is the first European Commission's president to actually reside in the Berlaymont. She sleeps in a small private area next to her main office on the 13th floor.

== History ==
=== Background ===
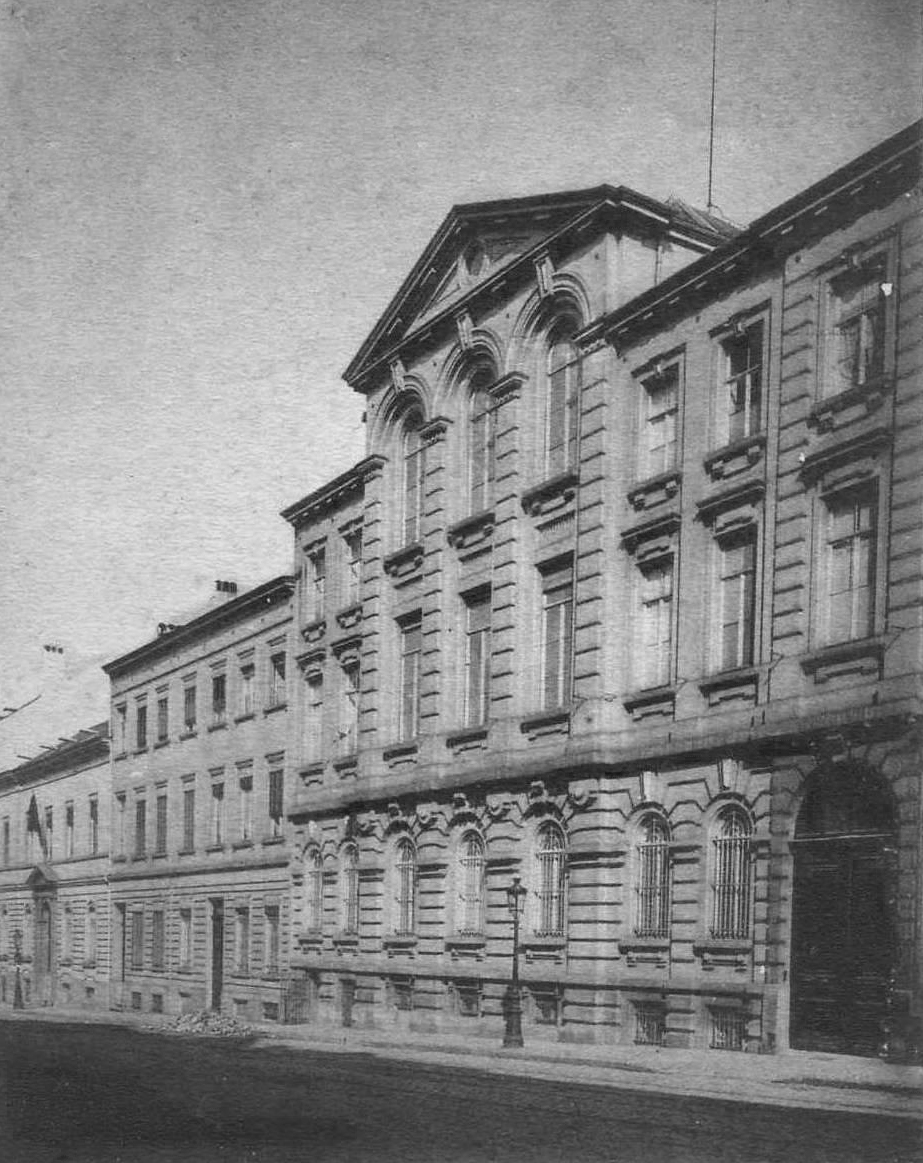
The Berlaymont convent and boarding school (Rue de la Loi/Wetstraat), c. 1900

With the number of European civil servants rapidly growing since their arrival in Brussels in 1958, the Commission of the European Economic Community required progressively more office space across the city. By 1965, the EEC Commission alone had 3,200 staff scattered across eight different cramped buildings. The situation, which (due to the lack of large office blocks) began as soon as they arrived, became critical, and the EEC Commission tried to concentrate its staff in a number of rented buildings around the Robert Schuman Roundabout. The Belgian government, becoming aware of the problem and keen to ensure that the EEC Commission stayed, offered to build a prestigious administration complex large enough to house the entire staff. Walter Hallstein, President of the Commission of the European Economic Community, was interested but cautious about making long-term commitments while the issue of where the institutions were based was still being discussed. However, the need for office space was overwhelming.

The Belgian government's proposal required sufficient land, which would preferably be in the Leopold Quarter (where they were already based) and near the homes of the civil servants to the south and east. The land chosen was then occupied by the Convent of the Ladies of Berlaymont, a 300-year-old convent that managed a girls' boarding school. The convent and school moved to a larger and quieter site in Waterloo, located south of today's Brussels-Capital Region. Once the Belgian state had finished their new school and built infrastructure for it, the Ladies of Berlaymont handed over the site — which, for years, they had been under pressure to sell to developers — to the Belgian government in November 1963.

To organise what was needed, the Belgian Foreign Minister Pierre Wigny suggested a Commission consultative Berlaymont, wherein the European Commission, the Belgian Public Works Ministry, the contractors and the architects could draw up the plans. However, the Belgian state desired not merely a building tailored to the European Commission, but one that could be used by its own civil servants were the European Commission to leave. This was also why the state favoured a central office building rather than the project for the construction of a "European city" in Etterbeek. The plans did not meet the exact desires of the European Commission, and hence the rent was reduced.

=== Construction ===
Work was planned so that as soon as each wing was complete, staff could move in while the rest of the building was still under construction. The north and east wings were to be completed first (estimated for August 1961, though that proved optimistic). The south wing would take longer given the need to demolish more buildings including the girls' school, with the Ladies of Berlaymont unable to vacate until 1963. The Belgian government, realising that budgetary constraints meant it could not meet any of the deadlines, resorted to outside funding from the Office de sécurité sociale d'Outre-mer (OSSOM). OSSOM would own the land but the building would be constructed and rented by the Belgian government, with rent deducted from its contribution to OSSOM's budget. Eventually, it would buy it in 1985 through regular instalments, while it was being sublet to the European Commission. OSSOM awarded the construction contract to an association of entrepreneurs, Enterprises François et Fils with Compagnie belge des Chemins de fer et d'entreprises, Compagnie industrielle de travaux and Armand Blaton. The lack of a public tender was criticised by the Belgian Audit Office.

The Berlaymont building in 1974

In 1963, the first (north-east) wing entered its active phase and was scheduled to be finished by the end of 1965. Concreting on that wing was finished in November 1964. Completion was pushed back from the start of 1966 by a year due to the rail companies failing to vault the nearby railway line that prevented access to the ground floor. The wing was completed on 1 February 1967, with the first civil servants moving in three months later. The three-month gap was due to disagreements about the conditions of the lease. The Belgian state was to lease the whole building to the European Commission starting from when the work was finished, but the other member states found the cost excessive and wished to explore other options, gaining a lease for the one and only completed wing instead. The lease came into effect on 1 May 1967 and cost €545,366 (the whole building would be €4.82 million, a reduction of €2.48 million taking into account construction costs). The building was only fully occupied at the beginning of September of that year.

=== Expansion ===
However, from the start of the project, it was clear that the European Commission would expand beyond the capacity of the Berlaymont. The Charlemagne building became available for the European Commission. Furthermore, there was a building on the Rue Archimède/Archimedesstraat; this would allow the European Commission to concentrate itself in these buildings around the Schuman Roundabout and vacate the outer office complex. The cost of this deterred the Council of the European Union from approving the plan, seeing the rent being driven too high.

The European Commission also wanted to occupy the whole of the Berlaymont, which it shared with the Council of the European Union and European Parliament. The general public most associated the European Commission with the Berlaymont and it was seen as a matter of pride that the European Commission occupy the entire building. Doing so would give the European Commission more room, and if it occupied the Berlaymont with the Joyeuse Entrée building, which it had before, it would have enough space, and the Charlemagne building could be occupied entirely by the Council of the European Union. This would mean they could communicate well but not have to work in the same building. The Council of the European Union eventually agreed but moved into a different building on the roundabout.

=== Renovation ===
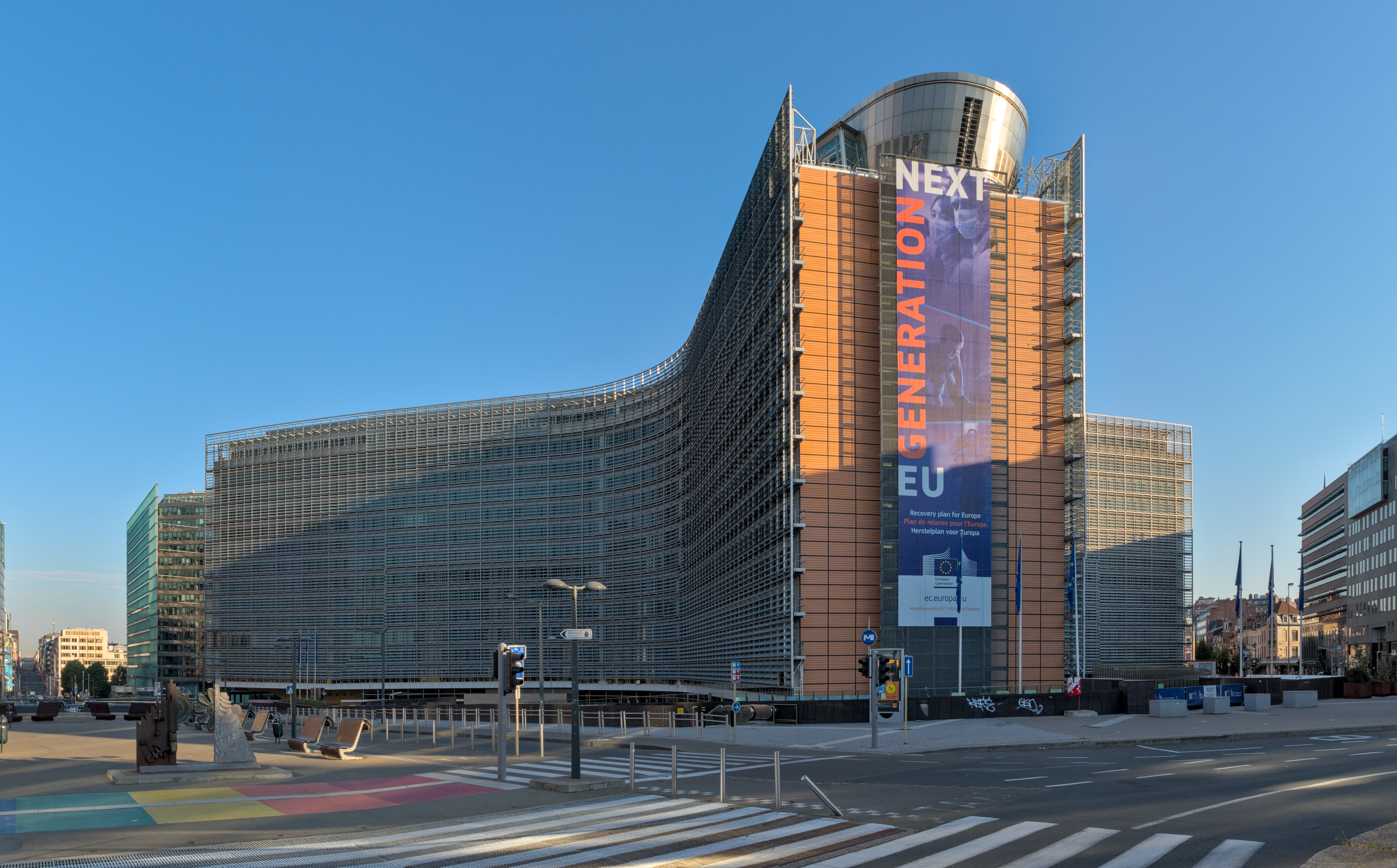
The Berlaymont area in 2020

Renovation of the building became the responsibility of the Belgian state when it bought the Berlaymont from OSSOM in 1985, but put off any work due to budgetary constraints. The European Commission complained, and Belgium offered to sell the building to it at a reduced rate (the rent was already half), but as the political question of a permanent seat had not been decided, the European Commission was not in a position to buy. Renovation suddenly became an important issue when flaked asbestos was found in the building in 1990. The civil servants' trade unions put on the pressure and the issue was used as a pretext for a full renovation, as the facilities had become outdated and were not able to cope with the influx of new member states.

Demolition was not an option as the foundations anchored the local road and metro networks, which would be put in danger if the Berlaymont were to be knocked down. However, it was hard to establish a full renovation budget due to budgetary constraints of the Belgian government. Hence, it was decided to bring in private sector financial institutions in the form of a management and renovation company: SA Berlaymont 2000 (in which the Belgian state remained a major shareholder). Berlaymont 2000 would pay €74.3 million to the Belgian state (also acting as a guarantor) and provide €160 million for the work, and in exchange it would gain a long lease on the building. Seeing it as a profitable investment, the following companies joined Berlaymont 2000: Citilease (affiliate of Citybank), CGER and BACOB. They began to provide finance and the European Commission's rent went up considerably to cover costs. The project was scheduled to start in 1994 and to take five years.

At the end of 1991, the commissioners and their cabinets moved to the rapidly completed Breydel building. Other departments moved out to buildings across the quarter, and in the municipalities of Auderghem, Evere and Etterbeek in the Brussels-Capital Region – in total, 11 buildings costing €14.8 million a year to the Belgian state. In return, the European Commission continued to pay the Berlaymont's rent during the vacancy of that building. However, the project began to face setbacks, which tarnished Belgium's image, as it failed to decide working arrangements, and which put back preliminary studies until Berlaymont 2000 took over in 1996 and set up a team to carry out the necessary studies. The European Commission then stalled, doubting that the proposed plans would sufficiently adapt the Berlaymont to its new needs. Eventually, the plans were adapted enough for the European Commission not only to accept them and return to the Berlaymont but to pay the renovation costs, signing a long lease in 1997 with an option to purchase.

Work on removing the asbestos began in the summer of 1995, three-and-a-half years after the building was vacated. Work was expected to finish in February 1997, but inefficient organisation led to successive delays: rumours about air pollution and violation of standards, electricity failures and asbestos outside the screen brought work to a halt. Longer time frames and more capital were demanded to complete the work. Outside management was brought in with asbestos removal being completed in 1999. Renovation work started on 1 June 1999 with work on full modernisation of the building, including better natural light flows, and construction was expected to be finished by the end of 2001 according to optimistic forecasts. However, once more there were further delays from the subcontractors, Berlaymont 2000 and the National Railway Company of Belgium (SNCB/NMBS), the latter of which was constructing a railway link below the building. The completion date was pushed back each year until it reached mid-2004.

Despite further considerable delays and legal battles, the building was handed over to the European Commission in stages, starting from 1 July 2004, with civil servants moving back just before the start of the Barroso Commission, with their related cabinets and a total of 2,700 civil servants. In total, renovation took 13 years, five years longer than it took to build. The December 1998 handover date was delayed five times and the bill to the Belgian state for the poor planning and disagreements amounted, by some estimates, to €824 million.

=== Fire ===
On 18 May 2009, at approximately 11:00 GMT, the Berlaymont building was evacuated following a fire that started in the press room. There were no reported casualties. The building does not have a fire sprinkler system except in the garage.

== Architecture ==
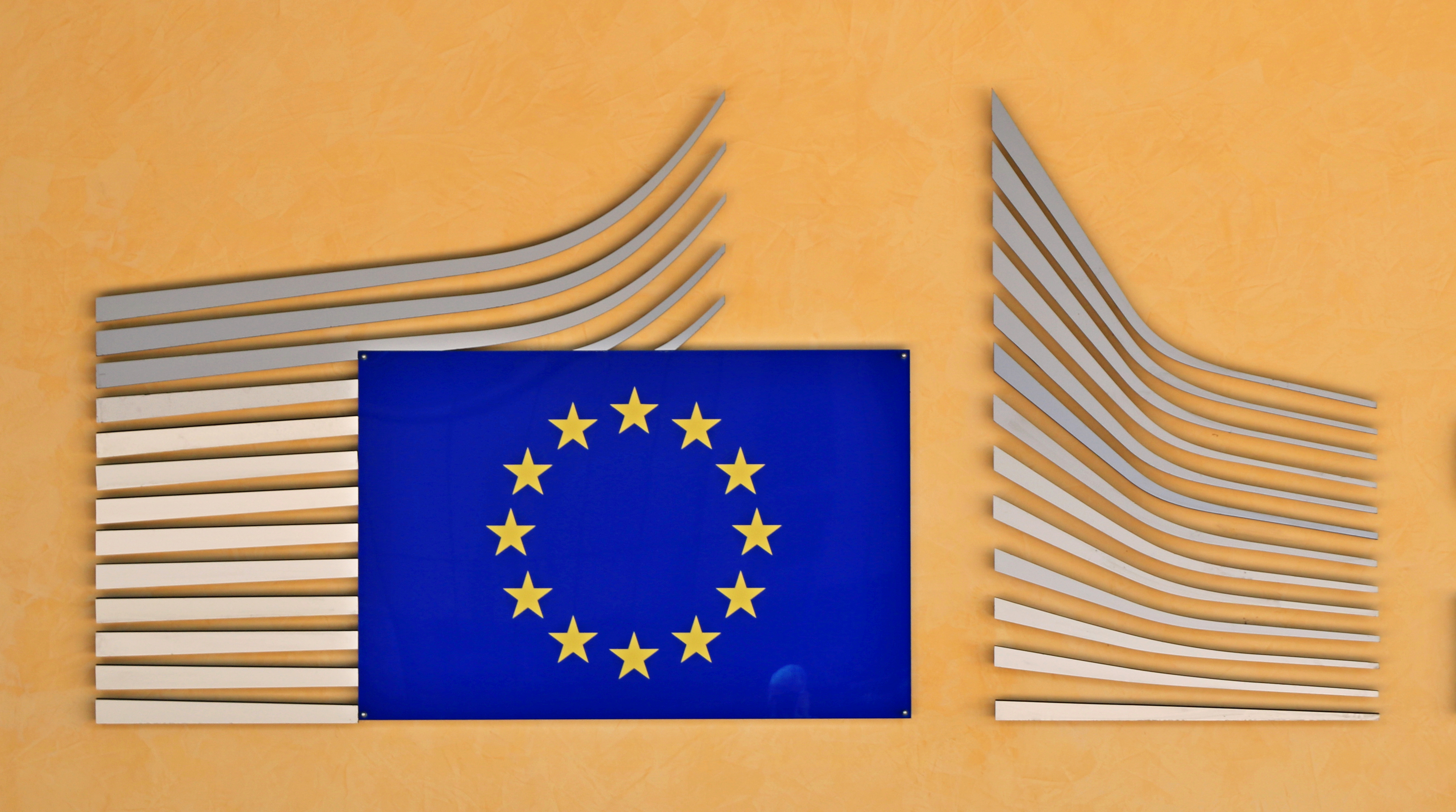
European Commission logo at the entrance of the Berlaymont building

The building, under the provisional name Centre Administratif Europe, was designed by Lucien De Vestel, in association with Jean Gilson (Groupe Alpha), André and Jean Polak and with the recommendations of the engineer Joris Schmidt. It was directly inspired by the 1958 secretariat building of UNESCO in Paris (which was designed by Marcel Breuer, Pier Luigi Nervi and Bernard Zehrfuss). The technical design was ground-breaking at the time, and generated an enthusiastic response from a Brussels journal: "This design concept reflects both the 20th century innovative spirit and sheer audacity and brings to mind the astonishing civil engineering arrow at the 1958 exhibition."

The building has a cruciform design with four wings of unequal size spanning from a central core. It is built on piles located beneath each wing, supporting a 40-metre-high (130 ft) narrow ridge of concrete, which in turn supported steel beams forming the frame of the glass façade covering the prefabricated floors. The top (13th) floor, however, is supported directly by the upper beams, suspended entirely by them, making the lower level free-standing except for the core. The design is intended to convey a feeling of light and transparency. It includes decorative details such as sculptures and frescos to prevent it from becoming monotonous.

The complex was initially designed to house 3,000 civil servants and 1,600 cars in a four-level underground car park under the whole complex. Foundations run 20 m (66 ft) deep. The number of lower levels (which link to the road tunnels and metro) was due to the 55 m (180 ft) height restriction around the Parc du Cinquantenaire/Jubelpark (so as not to spoil the view). It included 17 flexible conference rooms that could be used by the European Parliament and Council of Ministers. There were a further nine European Commission meeting rooms on the upper floors. Free space outside was converted into public gardens and terraces.

Since renovation, the structure has not changed except for a press extension, but there have been a number of internal and landscape changes. Traffic flow has been improved, but underground parking has been reduced by 25% and surface parking has been almost entirely converted into a pedestrian mall that flows into the surrounding urban landscape. Security has been improved, and a lighting well provides natural light to the restaurant and multimedia centres. The helipad was replaced by a cupola that houses the European Commission's meeting room, looking out over the Schuman Roundabout. The building meets the strictest environmental standards, reusing light, power and heat throughout the building.

The façade was replaced with a curtain wall with mobile glass screens that adapt to weather conditions and reduce glare while still allowing light in. They also act as a sound barrier, reducing noise from the Rue de la Loi. The windows cut off the air conditioning when opened to prevent energy being wasted. Offices, which are now larger, can have their heating adjusted automatically or individually. The heating is turned off automatically when the room is unoccupied.

The building now has 240,500 m^{2} (2,589,000 sq ft) of floor space on 18 levels, connected by 42 lifts and 12 escalators. Offices for 3,000 officials and meeting rooms are in the tower. A restaurant, a 900-seat cafeteria, a TV studio, conference rooms, storage rooms, a Nordic sauna, car parking for over 1,100 vehicles and various services occupy the basement. Architects Pierre Lallemand, Steven Beckers and Wilfried Van Campenhout carried out the 1991–2004 renovation.

== See also ==
- Europa building
- Justus Lipsius building
- Lex building
- Madou Plaza Tower
- Brussels and the European Union
- Institutional seats of the European Union
