= Lucien de Vestel =

Belgian architect

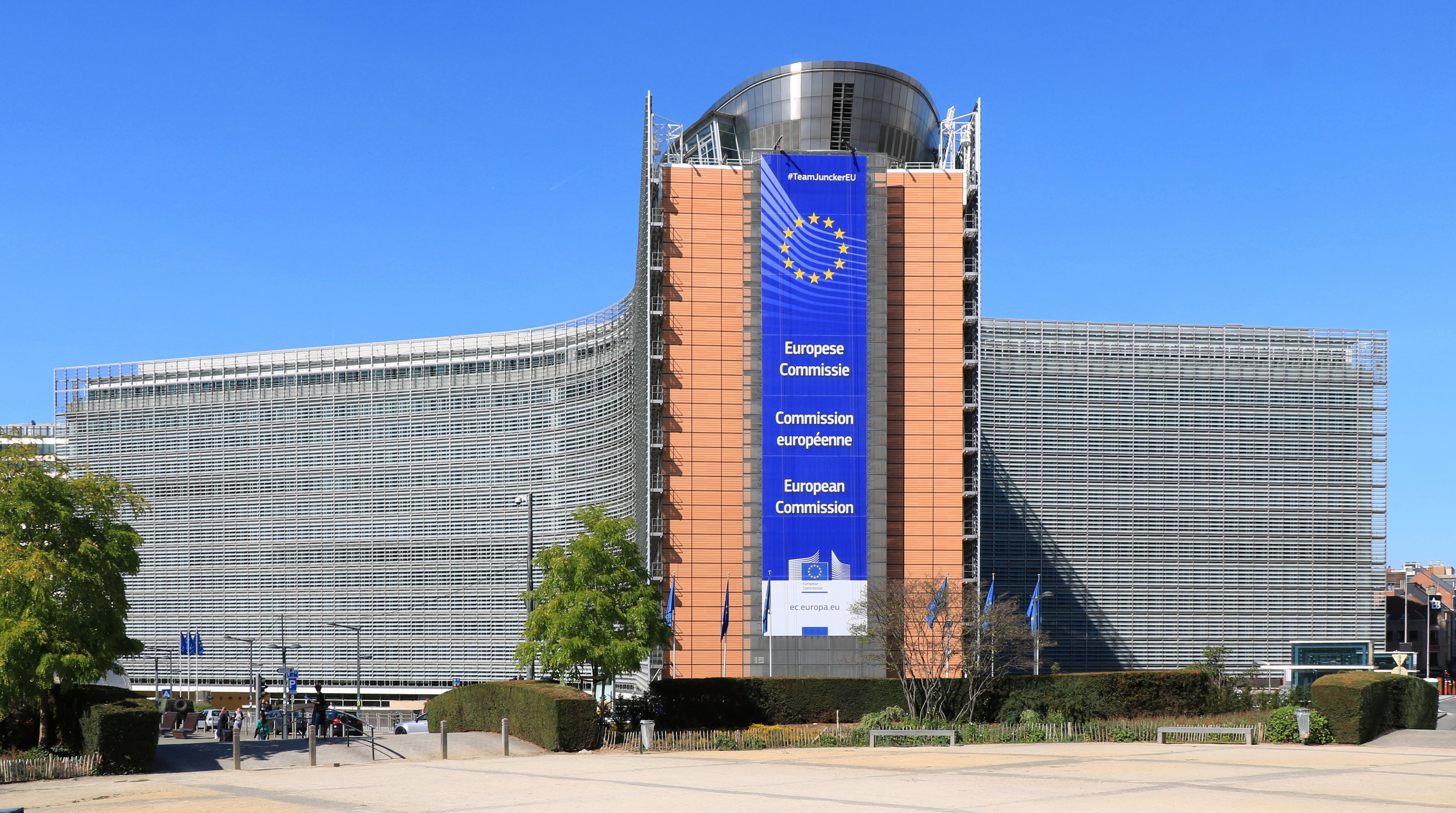
Headquarters of the European Commission in Brussels (Berlaymont building).

Lucien De Vestel (January 26, 1902 in Elsene – August 21, 1967 in Brussels) was a Belgian architect known for designing the Berlaymont in Brussels.

He was a modernist who did a lot of work in the interwar period in rebuilding housing and apartment blocks where great expertise was needed for textures and colours. He was briefly associated with Henri Lacoste, who he worked with at the Belgian pavilion of the Paris colonial exhibition in 1931. He then worked on the extension of the Museum of Natural Sciences in Leopold Park in Brussels where he tried to open up the Luxembourg station area but lacked sufficient funding. He further failed to win any major design competition for public buildings.

Following the Second World War he got interested in prefabricated housing construction techniques and eventually won the design for the Berlaymont, however he died in 1967 before it was completed.
