= Chancery (medieval office) =

Medieval writing office

A chancery or chancellery (Latin: cancellaria) is a medieval writing office, responsible for the production of official documents. The title of chancellor, for the head of the office, came to be held by important ministers in a number of states, and remains the title of the heads of government in modern Germany and Austria. Chancery hand is a term for various types of handwriting associated with chanceries.

== Etymology ==
The word chancery is from French, from Latin, and ultimately refers to the lattice-work partition that divided a section of a church or court, from which also derives chancel, cancel "cross out with lines", and, more distantly, incarcerate "put behind bars" – see chancery for details.

== In England ==
In England's medieval government, this office was one of the two main administrative offices, along with the Exchequer. It began as part of the royal household, but by the 13th century was separate from the household and was located at Westminster. It produced all the charters and writs, which were all sealed with the Great Seal.

The office was headed by the Chancellor of England, and was staffed by royal clerks. It came into existence shortly before the Norman Conquest of England, and was retained by King William I of England after the Conquest. In 1199, the chancery began to keep the Charter Rolls, a record of all the charters issued by the office. Then in 1201, the Patent Rolls, a similar record of letters patent began, and in 1204 the Close Rolls, or record of letters close began. Although the English Chancery was responsible for most of the charters and writs issued by the government, they were not responsible for all of them, as the Exchequer and the justiciars continued to issue writs during the Angevin period.

Whether there was a formal chancery office in Anglo-Saxon England prior to the Norman Conquest is a matter of some debate amongst historians. Some hold that most royal charters in Anglo-Saxon England were produced by the beneficiaries of the charter. Other historians hold that by the 10th and 11th centuries most royal charters were produced by royal clerks, and thus they probably were produced in some sort of chancery-like office.

The Crown Office in Chancery is a descendant from the Court of Chancery, and is responsible of all modern administrative work relating to the Great Seal of the Realm and Royal sign manual.

== In Castile ==
The Real Audiencia y Chancillería de Valladolid was the top court for the Crown of Castile.

== In the crusader states ==
The crusader states in the Levant also had chanceries. In the Principality of Antioch, the office was responsible for producing all documents pertaining to the administration of the principality. One office holder in the Antiochene chancery was Walter the Chancellor, who wrote the only early history of the state.

In the Kingdom of Jerusalem, the chancery produced hundreds of documents. The chancellor of Jerusalem was one of the highest posts in the kingdom. One famous chancellor was the chronicler William of Tyre.

== In Normandy ==
In the Duchy of Normandy, after 1066 a ducal chancery developed, especially under William's sons Robert Curthose and Henry I.

== In France ==
The French royal chancery first appears in a rudimentary form during the Merovingian dynasty. They borrowed from the diplomatic institutions of the late Roman Empire, and had four officials, usually clerics, called "referendaries" who guarded the king's seal. The documents are very formulaic, probably using the formulary of Marculf as a source. They used their own script, which was very messy with many ligatures, and their Latin was of very poor quality.

After the Merovingians were overthrown by the Mayors of the Palace, the chancery began to develop more fully. The Carolingian chancellor was usually the Archbishop of Reims. He was a member of the king's council, while the actual business of the chancery was conducted by lesser officials. Louis the Pious created a new formulary, the Formulae Imperiales, which was the basis of formularies used in later centuries. They also used a different script, the more legible Carolingian minuscule. The Carolingian chancery took requests from those who wished to have a charter drawn up, and the king would send missi to investigate the situation.

In the Capetian period, the chancellor was still the Archbishop of Reims. The chancery itself tended not to write its own charters, but rather confirmed charters that had already been written by the intended recipient. This reflected the relative powerlessness of the Capetian kings, who, unlike their Carolingian predecessors, controlled only the Ile-de-France. It was not until the 12th century that the chancellor truly became the head of the chancery, rather than the guardian of the king's seal. This chancellor was a member of the Great Officers of the Crown of France, which developed in the 11th and 12th centuries. Because the chancellor had power over the granting of charters and other benefits, the kings often saw them as a threat to their own authority, and the office sometimes lay dormant for many years. Philip II abolished the post in 1185, and the chancery remained without an official head for most of the thirteenth and part of the fourteenth century. The head of the chancery in this period took over the guardianship of the seal, and was usually not a cleric. Documents in this period were signed as "cancellaria vacante" ("with the chancellorship vacant"). When the chancellorship was restored in the fourteenth century, it was held by laymen and became the highest ranking of the Great Officers.

In the fourteenth century the rest of the chancery staff consisted of notaries and secretaries. They were appointed by the chancellor and wrote royal letters and other documents that were not already produced by the beneficiaries. The most important official after the chancellor was the audencier, who presided over the ceremony in which the chancellor affixed the royal seal to a document. The chancery charged a tax to recipients of charters; Jews were taxed at a higher rate, but royal grants of alms or other donations were not usually taxed. The Capetian chancery also used a minuscule script, and documents were written in Latin until the thirteenth century, when French also began to be used.

The majority of the documents produced by the chancery were letters patent, which were directed from the king to a single person. They could be letters of thanks, financial transactions, letters of justice and pardon, legitimization of children, recognition of nobility, and many other subjects. Charters authorizing grants of land or settling property disputes are less common. Documents were not registered in an archive until the fourteenth century, and then only rarely, if the document pertained to royal administration.

Normally a document was validated by witnesses, including the author, the chancellor, or other nobles; the early Capetians derived their authority from the number of people they could collect to sign a document. Later in the Middle Ages the kingship had regained enough power that the king's seal was considered authoritative enough on its own.

== In Scotland ==
The chancery office was abolished in 1928. Modern day chancery work relating to the Great Seal of Scotland is completed by the Registers of Scotland and National Records of Scotland.

== Under the papacy ==
The medieval popes had a Chancery of Apostolic Briefs, which was one of the four great papal offices, the others being the Apostolic Camera, which handled finances, the Penitentiary, which dealt with spiritual matters, and the Sacra Rota, which dealt with judicial matters.

== See also ==
- Chancery (disambiguation), for other meanings
- Chancellery, the offices of various chancellors
- Chancellor (China)
