= Court of Chancery (disambiguation) =

The Court of Chancery was a court of equity in England and Wales.

Court of Chancery or Chancery Court may also refer to:

- Chancery Court of York, an ecclesiastical court in England
- Chancery Division of the High Court of Justice, present-day court in England and Wales
- Delaware Court of Chancery
- Mississippi Chancery Courts, part of the Courts of Mississippi
- Tennessee Chancery and Probate Courts, part of the Courts of Tennessee
- New Jersey Chancery Courts, part of the New Jersey Superior Court

Court of Chancery may also refer to the following former civil courts:

- Court of Chancery (Ireland)
- Court of Chancery of the County Palatine of Durham and Sadberge
- Court of Chancery of the County Palatine of Lancaster
- Court of Chancery of Upper Canada
- New York Court of Chancery
- Michigan Court of Chancery

== See also ==
- Court of Appeal in Chancery, which heard appeals from the English Court of Chancery
- Chancery (disambiguation)
- Court of equity
