= Lex building =

High-rise in Brussels, Belgium

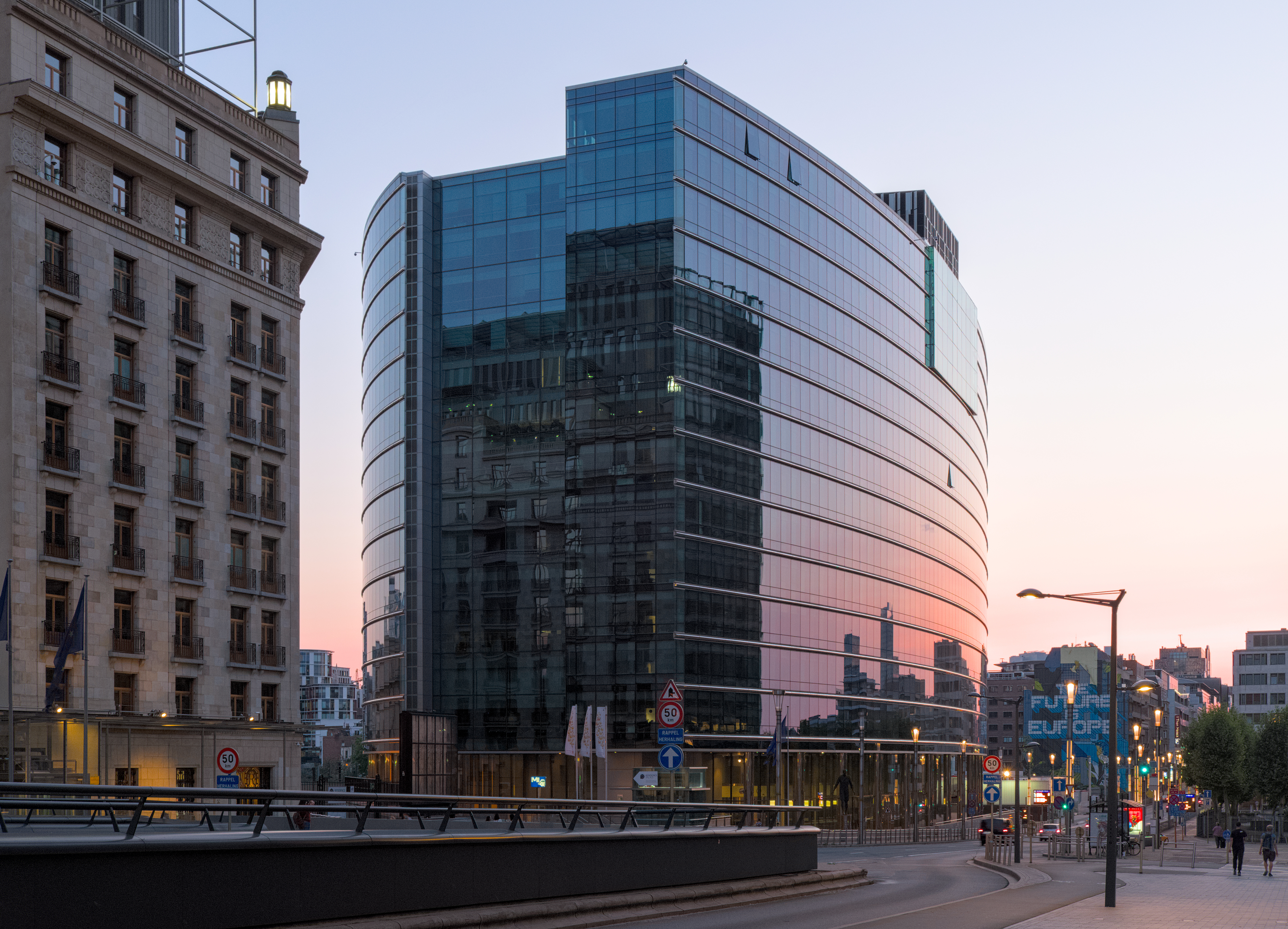
- The Lex building seen from the north-east
- Interactive map of the Lex building area

General information
- Type: Office building
- Location: Rue de la Loi / Wetstraat 145, 1040 City of Brussels, Brussels-Capital Region, Belgium
- Coordinates: 50°50′35″N 4°22′44″E
- Construction started: 2004
- Completed: 2006
- Owner: Council of the European Union

Technical details
- Floor count: 15

The Lex building is a high-rise of government offices in the European Quarter of Brussels, Belgium. It is an annexe building of the European Council and Council of the European Union (their main building is the Europa building) and is located at 145, rue de la Loi/Wetstraat.

== History ==
Work began in 2001, with construction starting in 2004 when the old building was demolished. It was finished in 2006. The building was built and is owned by the Lex 2000 company, with the Council having long term rent on the building and the option to buy. Due to the increase in office space, Lex 2000 has had to finance renovation of nearby apartments to compensate.

The building was erected on the site of a private mansion, similar to the neighbouring Résidence Palace, which was demolished instead of renovated in order to create a much larger modern building. Extra space for the EU institutions were needed in time for the 2004 enlargement of the European Union. At the time, the existing Justus Lipsius building could not be extended due to residential areas and the then-existing conservation orders on the adjacent Résidence Palace (later partially demolished and renovated to become the Europa building), thus Lex became a new project to satisfy the need for more office space.

The first plans were submitted in 1988 by the company that built the Espace Léopold. However, they were deemed too ambitious by the local authorities. The building was intended to be tall, serving as a gateway into the area together with the Charlemagne building opposite. The authorities demanded a reduction of 20 metres (66 ft), giving it 15 floors instead of the planned 20, in order to preserve the visual dominance of the Berlaymont building and the Cinquantenaire Arcade.

== Features ==
There are three basement floors for technical services, though the car park was built with less than 200 spaces as it was deemed the public transport links compensated for lack of car parking spaces. The main entrance has direct links to the metro and rail stations with the ground floor being occupied by a large restaurant. The building's glass structure is intended to convey transparency, with two floors being cleared to give a more open feel inside.

== See also ==
- Breydel building
- Madou Plaza Tower
- Brussels and the European Union
- Institutional seats of the European Union
