= Chancery (diplomacy) =

Building which houses a diplomatic mission or embassy

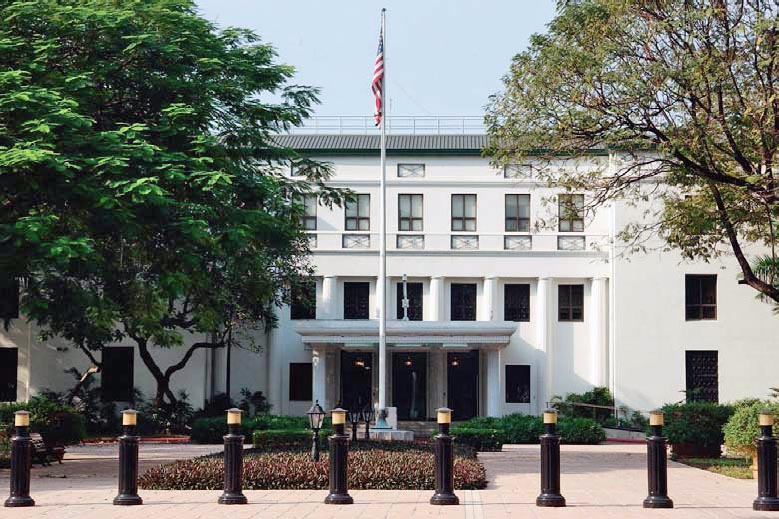
Chancery of the United States Embassy, Manila.

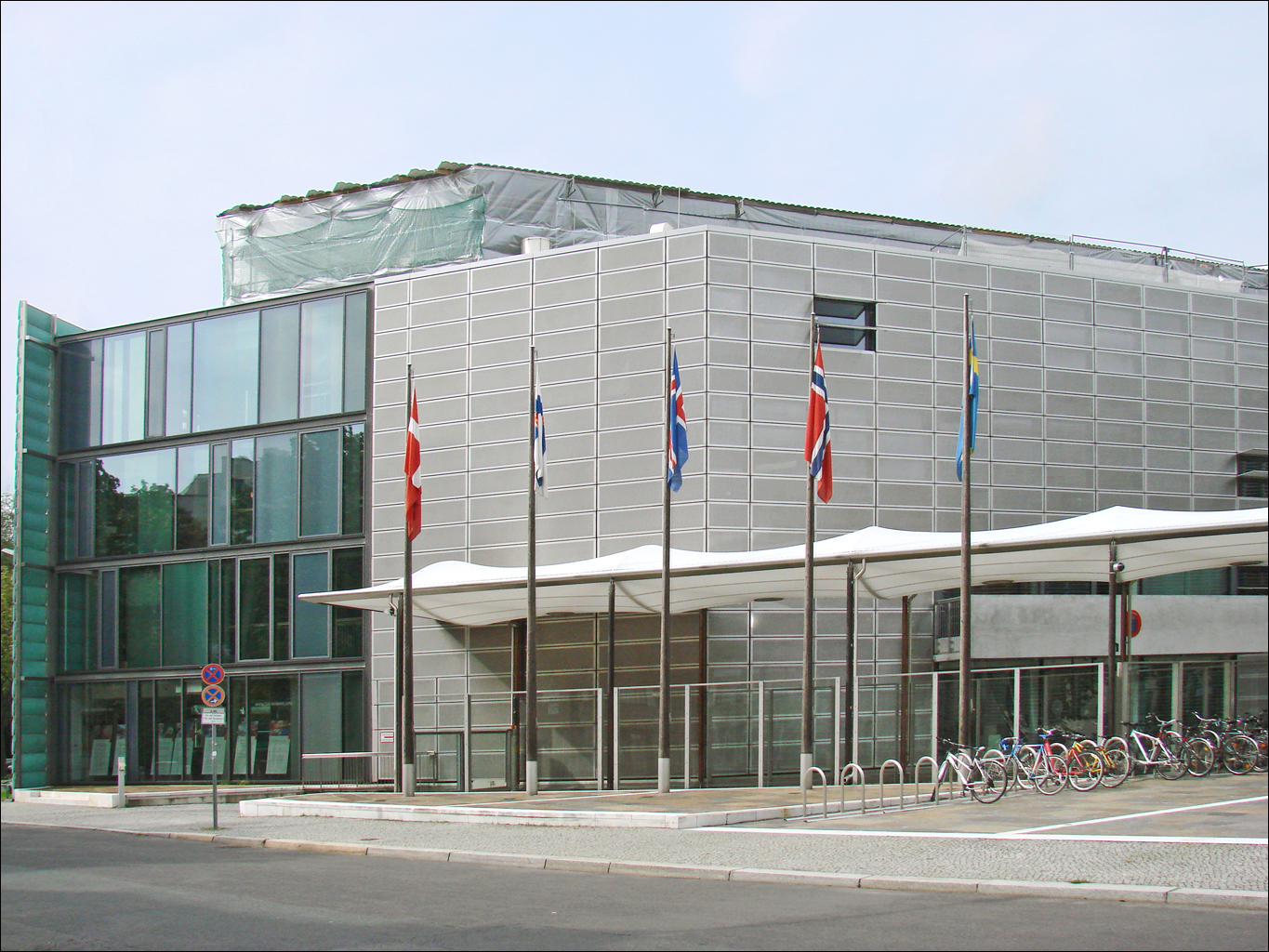
An example of a chancery hosting multiple embassies: Nordic Embassies in Berlin, Germany.

A chancery is the principal office that houses a diplomatic mission or an embassy. This often includes the associated building and the site. The building can house one or several different nations' missions. The term derives from chancery or chancellery, the office of a chancellor. Some nations title the head of foreign affairs a chancellor, and "chancery" eventually became a common referent to the main building of an embassy.

The term "embassy" technically or historically refers to the ambassador's residence and not their office, although their residence and office were often collocated. Among diplomats the terms "embassy residence" and "embassy office" is used to distinguish between the ambassador's residence and the chancery. In some cases, an ambassador's residence and the business office are still located in the same building.

There is evidence of the existence of chanceries throughout history, playing a key role in the facilitation of diplomacy and bilateralism. Chanceries have persisted into the modern age and still play a key role in the formation of foreign relations and maintenance of diplomacy. The function of a chancery includes facilitating communication between sovereign states, upholding foreign policy, opening cultural connections and exchange as well as many other functions. Chanceries also have other uses which include providing diplomatic asylum to those seeking it as seen in the cases of Julian Assange and Chen Guangcheng.

Chanceries are said to be the interaction of diplomacy and architecture with the design of buildings heavily thought-upon. The characteristics of a chancery building, and its location is well-considered in order to achieve national interests. From the exterior appearance to interior design, each element plays a role in the diplomacy that takes place within the building’s walls. The features of a chancery are also crucial in ensuring that it can withstand attacks and keep its occupants safe and secure. Many precautions are taken to keep the chancery secure.

When countries do not have a diplomatic relationship, and no chancery is established, there is often a disguised embassy in another country instead. This is also known as a de facto embassy.

A large establishment of chanceries is the International Chancery Center (ICC) which is the first of its kind. This establishment is 47 acres of land in North-West Washington, D.C., US which is specifically allocated for chanceries.

== Establishing a chancery ==
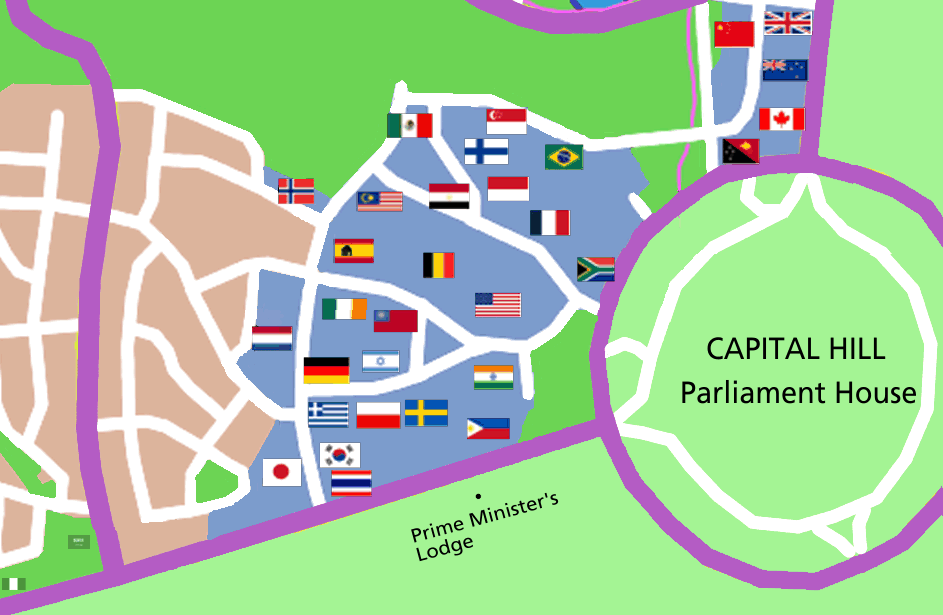
Collection of chanceries in Canberra, Australia.

In order to establish a chancery, the host country must first be informed then approve of requests. Then, once requests are approved, a block of land is allocated and building the chancery commences. Sovereign states follow the Vienna Convention on Diplomatic Relations (VCDR), an international treaty which guides international and diplomatic relations, in establishing chanceries and foreign missions. It is primarily believed that the land which the chanceries sit upon is a part of the guest country although this is wrong. This concept is called extraterritoriality which applies to certain situations where there is an exemption from the host country's laws. While chanceries are not fully exempt from the laws of the host country, the VCDR allows them only some exemptions and protections. A protection included is that diplomats are able to freely conduct their business without having to be subjected to local laws. This varies from situation to situation and some host countries may negotiate with the guest country on what they will and will not allow.

== Characteristics of a chancery ==
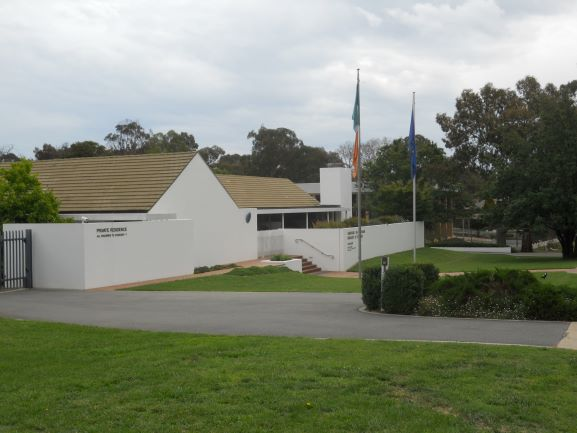
Irish Chancery in Canberra, Australia. Exterior design based on traditional Irish cottage

A chancery's characteristics are important to its functions. The way the chancery is designed and built has a large impact in the thoughts they evoke. A lot of consideration goes into the interior and exterior appearance. Since the goals of chanceries are to facilitate diplomatic relations between the host and guest nations, artefacts that symbolise their relationship are often used to decorate them. This includes paintings, murals and sculptures.

The design of a chancery and its structure also depends on the way the nation wants to be perceived. The chancery is a representation of a nation, and so is designed and carefully curated to align with the state image. Some nations have a uniform design that is used for their chanceries around the world. An example is the interior design of French chanceries in Brazil, Morocco and the US. Their chanceries, designed by Guillermo Jullian de la Fuente, all contain courtyards that allow for more open space and less restrictive diplomatic activities. Another example of the importance of design is seen in the chancery of the Embassy of Ireland in Canberra, Australia, which was built in 1980. The modern design was based on traditional cottage homes found in Ireland, with characteristics such as white walls and slate roofs.

Due to the political importance of chanceries and its propensity for attacks, they must be secure. The 21st century has seen attacks on chanceries and diplomatic missions making it vital for the premises to keep its occupants safe. Countries have been forced to ensure that their chanceries are fortified enough to withstand a range of attacks. US embassies in the Middle East and North African region have built stronger and higher fences in an effort to eradicate vulnerability.

== Roles of a chancery ==
A chancery has many roles. While it primarily acts as a venue for facilitating diplomatic relations, it is also a place with other functions which are vital to international relations and foreign affairs.

=== Chanceries as a place of refuge ===
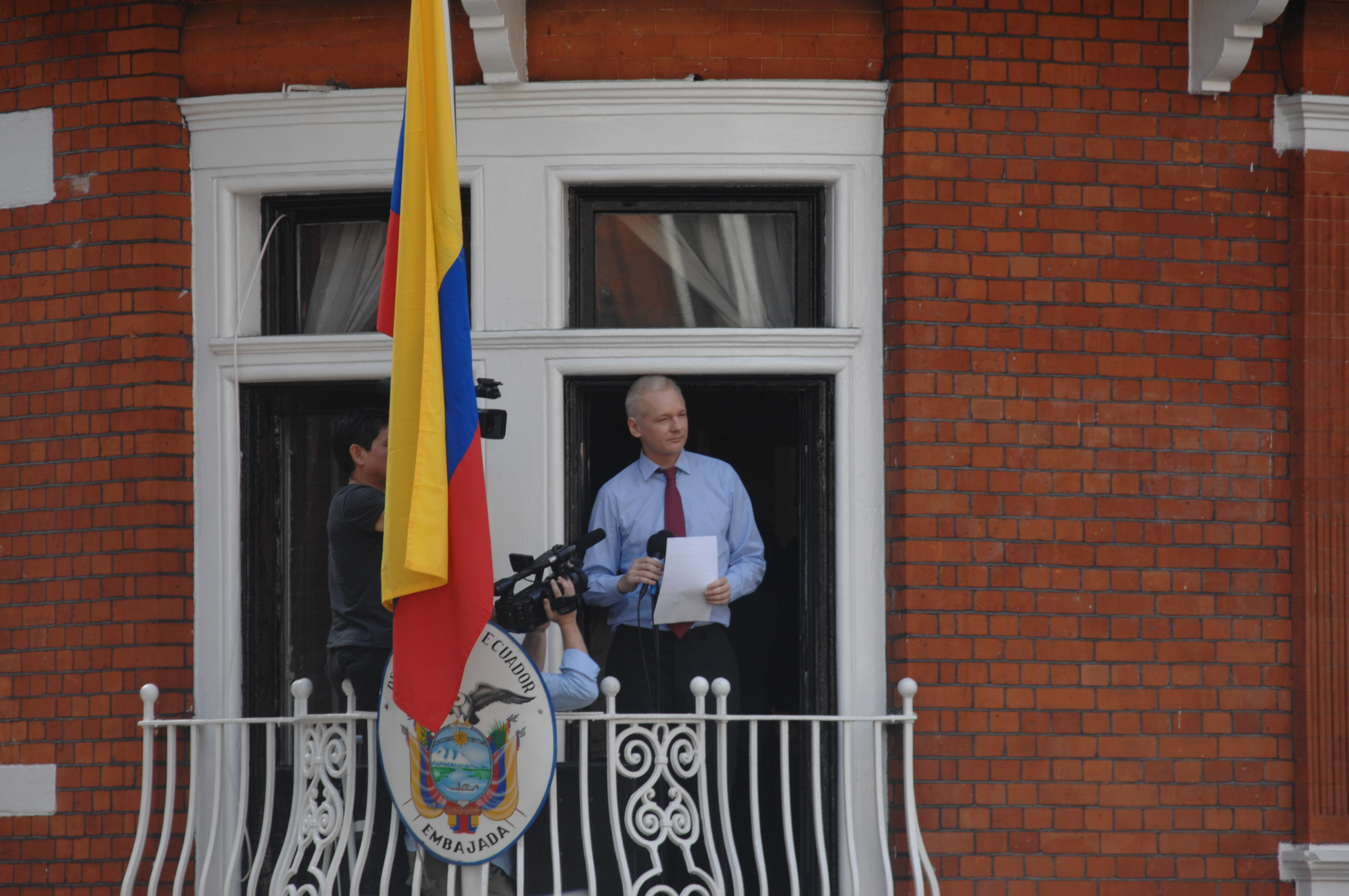
Julian Assange in the Embassy of Ecuador in London, UK

When seeking asylum, people are able to do this in chanceries. There are many legal debates on whether embassies or consulates are obligated to grant asylum, although according to the Universal Declaration of Human Rights (UDHR), Article 14 states that "everyone has a right to seek and enjoy in other countries asylum from persecution". There have been many cases of asylum seekers being granted refuge. An example is Julian Assange, who sought refuge in the Embassy of Ecuador in London, UK. Assange was charged with sexual assault in Sweden and was due to be extradited. Assange's bid for asylum came following concerns on his role in the leaking of many official documents from the United States. There were also fears of Sweden sending Assange to the United States where he would be persecuted. Assange's stay in the chancery meant protection from the Ecuadorian Government, who took his security seriously. A security organisation hired by the Ecuadorian Government monitored British police who guarded the premises or any person that entered the Ecuadorian Embassy. Another notable example is Chinese civil rights activist Chen Guangcheng, who sought refuge following his escape from house arrest at the United States embassy in Beijing, China. The blind civil rights activist feared persecution from China following his criticism of the Chinese Communist Party and its one-child policy. After negotiations with the US government, Chen and his family were granted asylum there and were able to migrate there despite China's vexation with the U.S.'s actions.

== Attacks on chanceries ==
The political importance and prominence of chanceries means that it has a great propensity for attacks, particularly those of a terrorist nature. There have been many notable attacks which have changed the way in which diplomacy is practiced in chanceries in other countries.

=== 1998 attack on Embassy of United States in Nairobi, Kenya ===
A terrorist attack on the United States Embassy in Nairobi, Kenya, occurred in August 1998. A truck was blown up in the premises, killing approximately 200 people and injuring another 5000 people. Following the attacks, there were debates on who was to blame for the occurrence of the attack, with many Kenyans suing the US. Many speculated that the US knew of the incoming attacks, claiming that they had intelligence that showed an impending attack on the US Embassy. The US alleged that the onus was placed on the Kenyan guards and local security. This led to questions on who was responsible on the security of the chancery and thus all chanceries established.

== International Chancery Center, USA ==
The International Chancery Center (ICC) is 47 acres of land in Washington, D.C., United States, that is allocated for chanceries. It was established in the early 1960s under the International Chancery Act. US diplomat William Crockett first devised the plan for the ICC. It hosts diplomatic properties such as foreign missions. The allocations for chanceries can be leased to countries who wish to establish a foreign mission in the United States. The ICC was established to address concerns with the lack of allocated land for diplomatic missions. This area is notable for its scenery and accommodates chanceries for a number of countries. In addition to chanceries and embassies, it can also host headquarters for international organisations.

== See also ==
- Embassy Row
- List of people who took refuge in a diplomatic mission
- List of attacks on diplomatic missions
