= Europa building =

Seat of the European Council and Council of the European Union

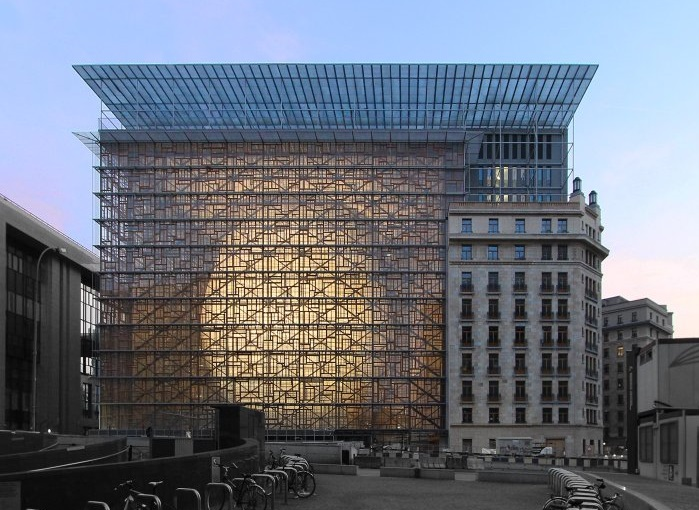
- The Europa building in Brussels, seen from across the Rue de la Loi/Wetstraat
- Interactive map of the Europa building area
- Former names: Résidence Palace - Bloc A

General information
- Architectural style: Art Deco; Contemporary
- Location: Rue de la Loi / Wetstraat 155, 1040 City of Brussels, Brussels-Capital Region, Belgium
- Coordinates: 50°50′33″N 4°22′51″E
- Current tenants: Seat of the European Council and Council of the European Union
- Construction started: 1922
- Completed: 1927
- Renovated: November 2007–December 2016
- Renovation cost: €321 million

Technical details
- Floor area: 70,646 m^{2} (760,430 sq ft)

Design and construction
- Architect: Michel Polak

Renovating team
- Architects: Philippe Samyn and Partners (architects & engineers, Lead and Design Partner); Studio Valle Progettazioni; Buro Happold
- Renovating firm: Jan De Nul Group (contractor, Lead and Construction Partner)
- Other designers: Georges Meurant

The Europa building is the seat of the European Council and Council of the European Union, located on the Rue de la Loi/Wetstraat in the European Quarter of Brussels, Belgium. Its defining feature is the multi-storey lantern-shaped construct holding the main meeting rooms, a representation of which has been adopted by both the European Council and Council of the EU as their official emblems.

The Europa building is situated on the former site of the partially demolished and renovated Bloc A of the Résidence Palace, a complex of luxurious apartment blocks. Its exterior combines the Art Deco façade of the original 1920s building, which has been listed since 2004, with the contemporary design of the architect Philippe Samyn. The building is linked via two skyways and a service tunnel to the adjacent Justus Lipsius building, which provides for additional office space, meeting rooms and press facilities.

== History ==
=== Construction and former usage: the Résidence Palace ===
Following the end of the First World War, the Walloon businessman Lucien Kaisin, in collaboration with the Swiss-Belgian architect Michel Polak, put forward plans for a complex of luxurious apartment blocks for the bourgeoisie and aristocracy, the Résidence Palace, to be situated on the edge of Brussels' Leopold Quarter. Consisting of five "Blocs" (A–E), it was to be "a small town within a city" able to provide its residents with onsite facilities, including a theatre hall, a swimming pool, as well as other commercial services such as a restaurants and hairdressers. The Résidence Palace aimed to address the dual shortage of suitable property and domestic workers for the upper classes following the destruction brought about during the war. The foundation stone of the Art Deco building was laid on 30 May 1923 with the first residents moving in 1927.

The development, however, only had a short commercial success. In 1940, tenants were forced to leave, as the building was requisitioned as the headquarters of the occupying German army during the Second World War. In September 1944, after the liberation of Brussels, the building was taken over as headquarters for the Supreme Headquarters Allied Expeditionary Force (SHAEF) and the RAF Second Tactical Air Force. After the war, in 1947, the Belgian government bought the complex and used Bloc A (the north-eastern L-shaped building) for administrative offices. At the end of the 1960s, as part of work to modernise the area during the construction of an underground railway line beneath the Rue de la Loi/Wetstraat, a new aluminium façade was built, closing the L-shape, under the supervision of Michel Polak's sons.

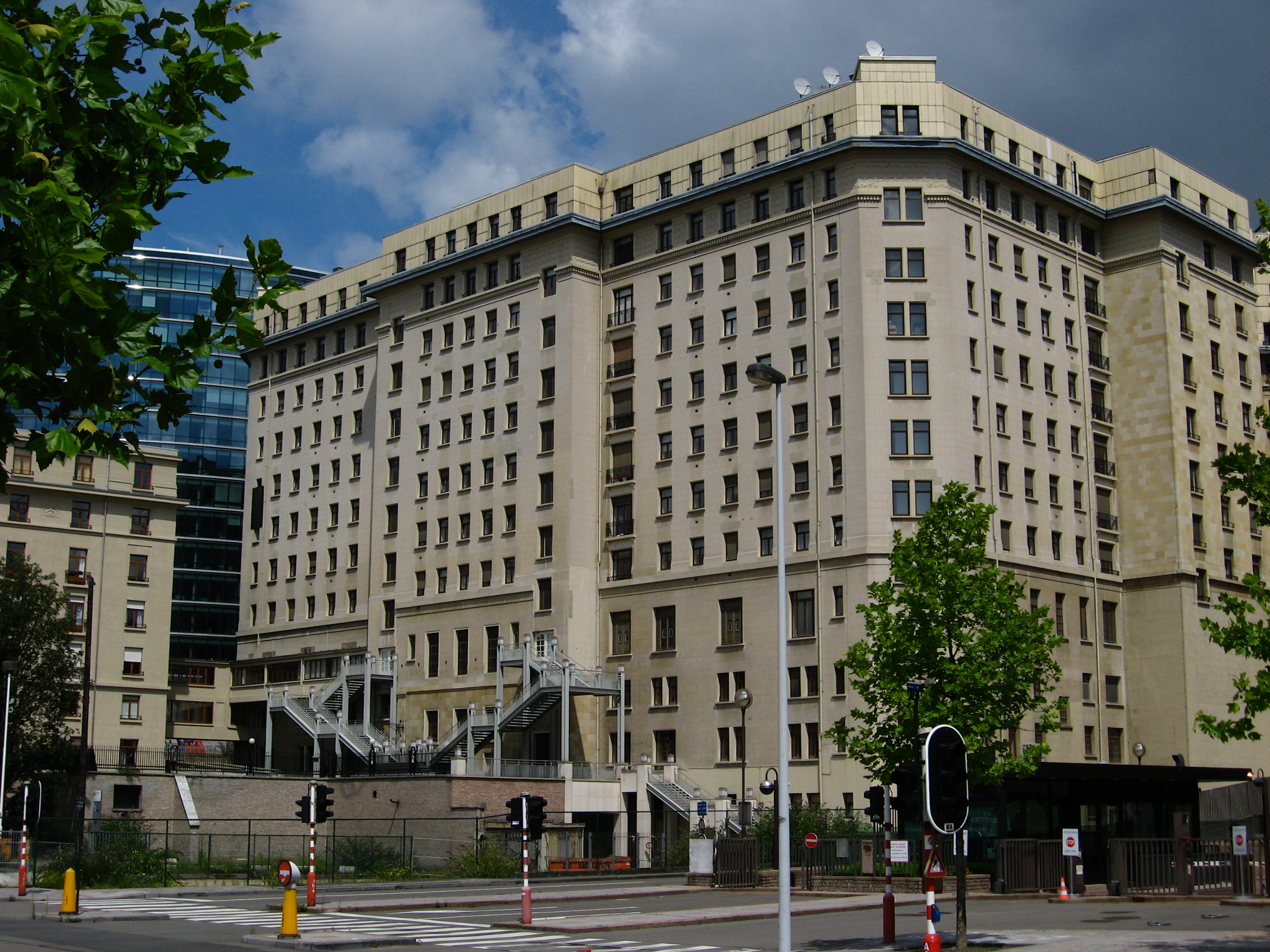
Résidence Palace (Polak and Peeters, 1922–1927)

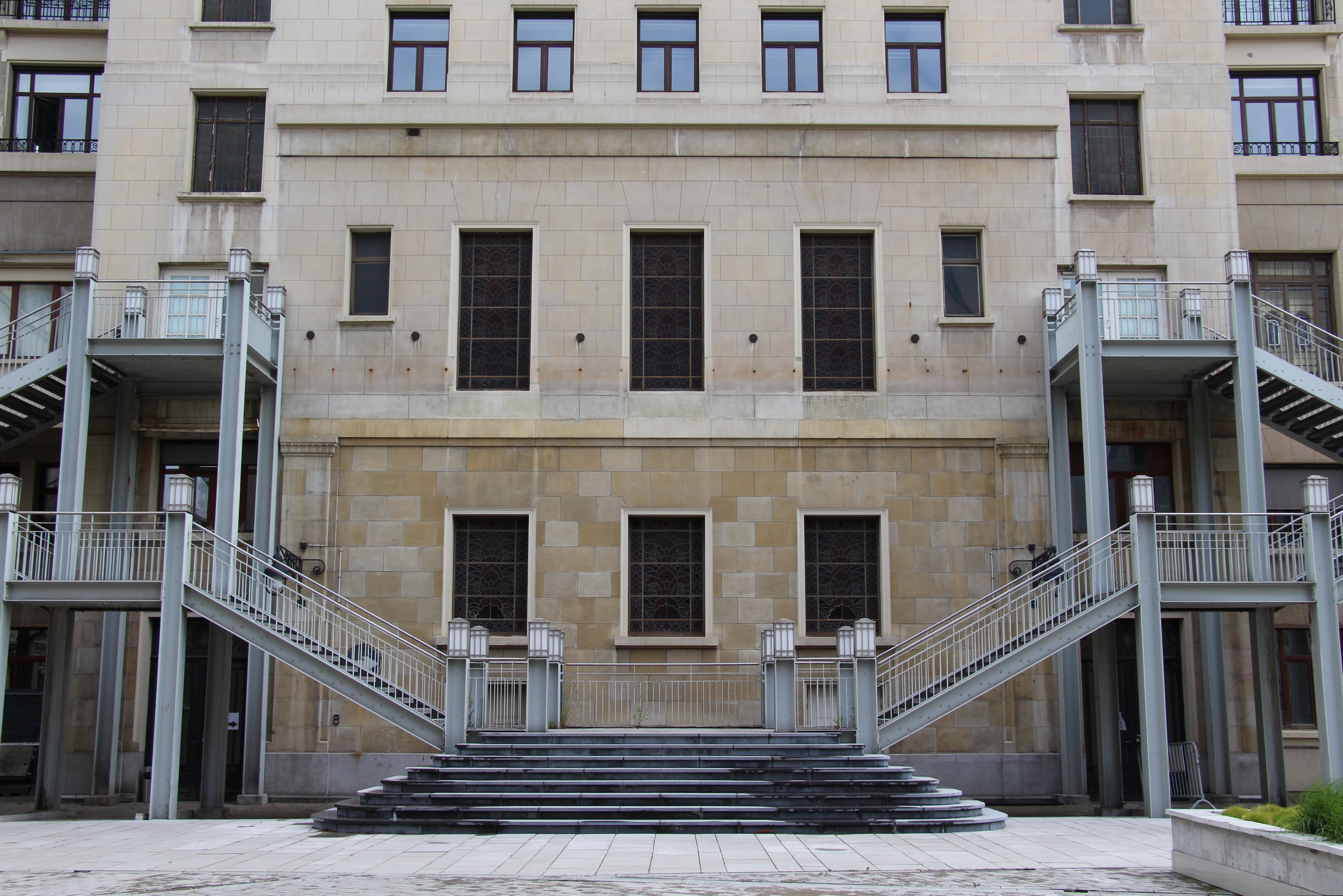
Stairway of the Résidence Palace

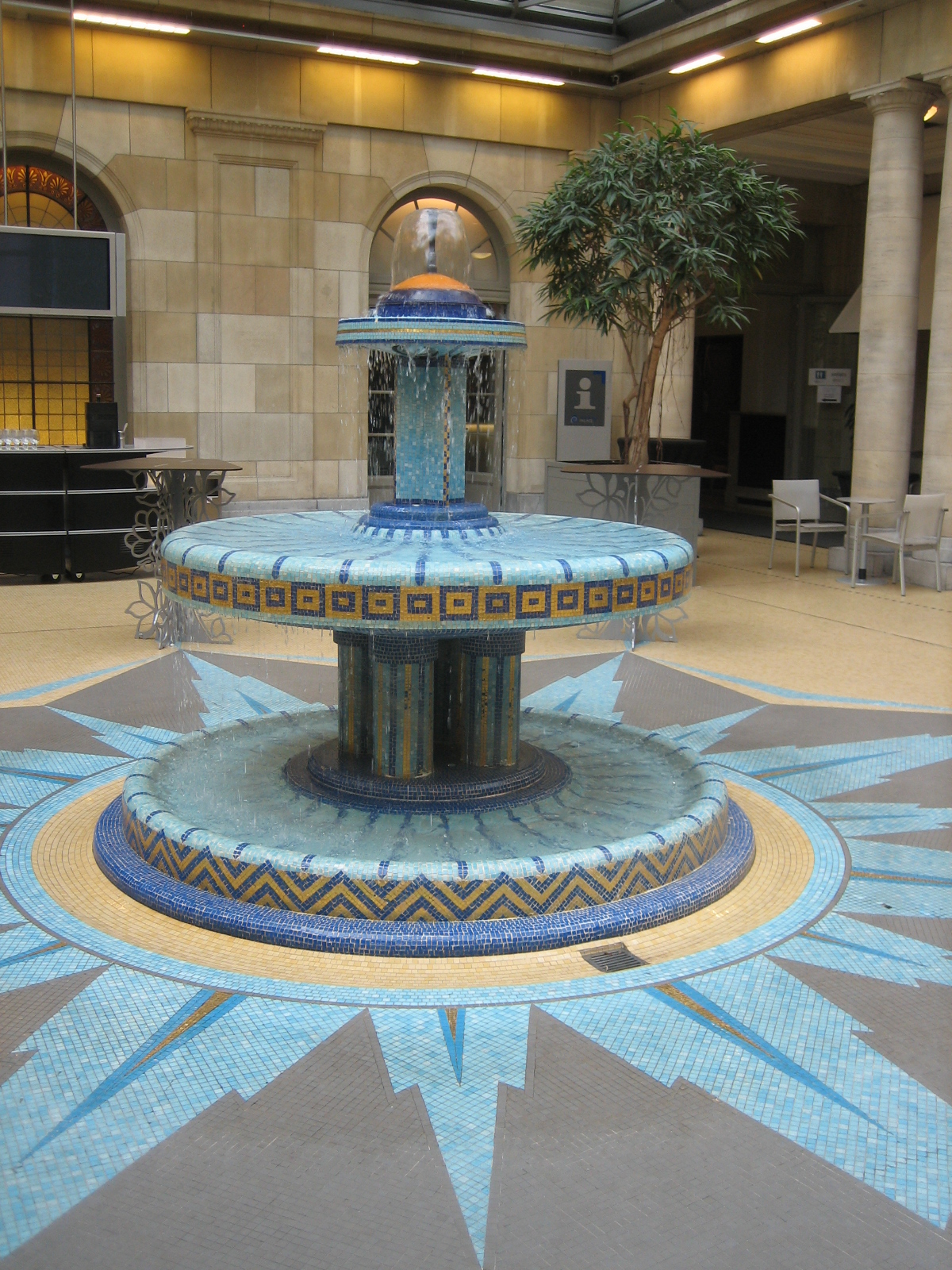
Résidence Palace's fountain

=== Development of the European Quarter ===
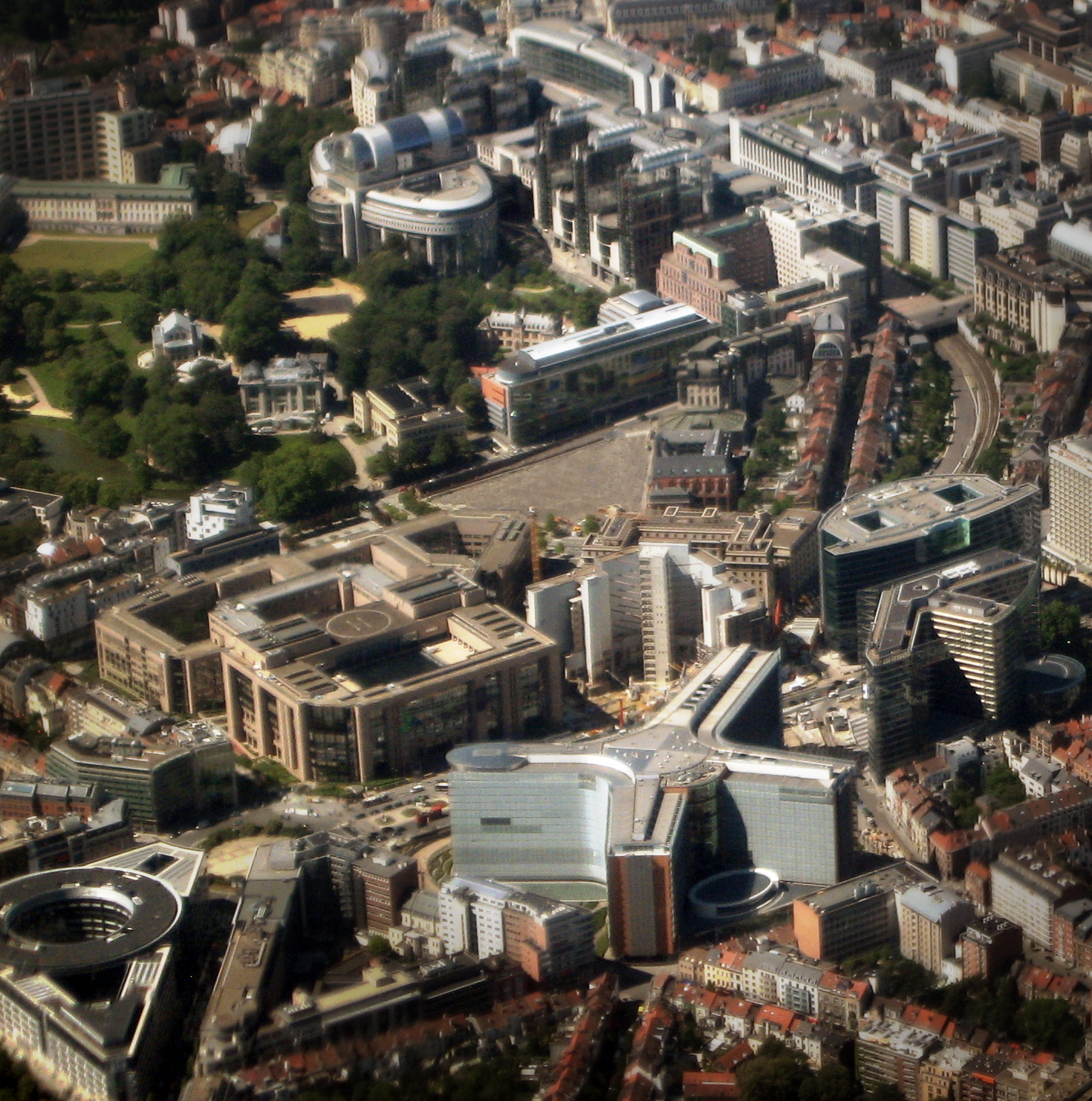
Aerial view of the European Quarter, c. 2011

With the development of the European Quarter in Brussels, city planners struggled to find suitable office space to house the growing staff and needs of the European Union (EU)'s institutions situated in close proximity to the Résidence Palace. In 1988, the eastern part of the Résidence Palace (Blocs D and E) was demolished to make way for the construction of the Justus Lipsius building as the seat of the Council of the European Union.

In 2002, the European Council, the organisation gathering the EU's Heads of state/government together, also began using the Justus Lipsius building as their Brussels venue. This followed an advanced implementation of a decision by European leaders during ratification of the Nice Treaty to do so at such a time as the total membership of the EU surpassed eighteen member states. Prior to this, the venue for European Council summits was in the member state that held the rotating presidency of the Council of the European Union. The resulting growing international media presence in the area led the Belgian government to develop Blocs C and B as the site of its new International Press Centre. A swimming pool and theatre were also maintained.

However, in 2004, leaders decided the logistical problems created by the outdated facilities warranted the construction of a new purpose-built seat able to cope with the nearly 6,000 meetings, working groups, and summits per year. This being despite a number of renovations to the Justus Lipsius building, including the conversion of an underground car park into additional meeting rooms. The Belgian government proposed as a solution the conversion of Bloc A of the Résidence Palace into a new permanent seat for both EU institutions. Under the deal, the site would be transferred from the Belgian government to the Council's Secretariat for the symbolic price of €1, with the Council of the EU assuming the costs for the subsequent construction project.

=== Transformation of Bloc A into the Europa building ===
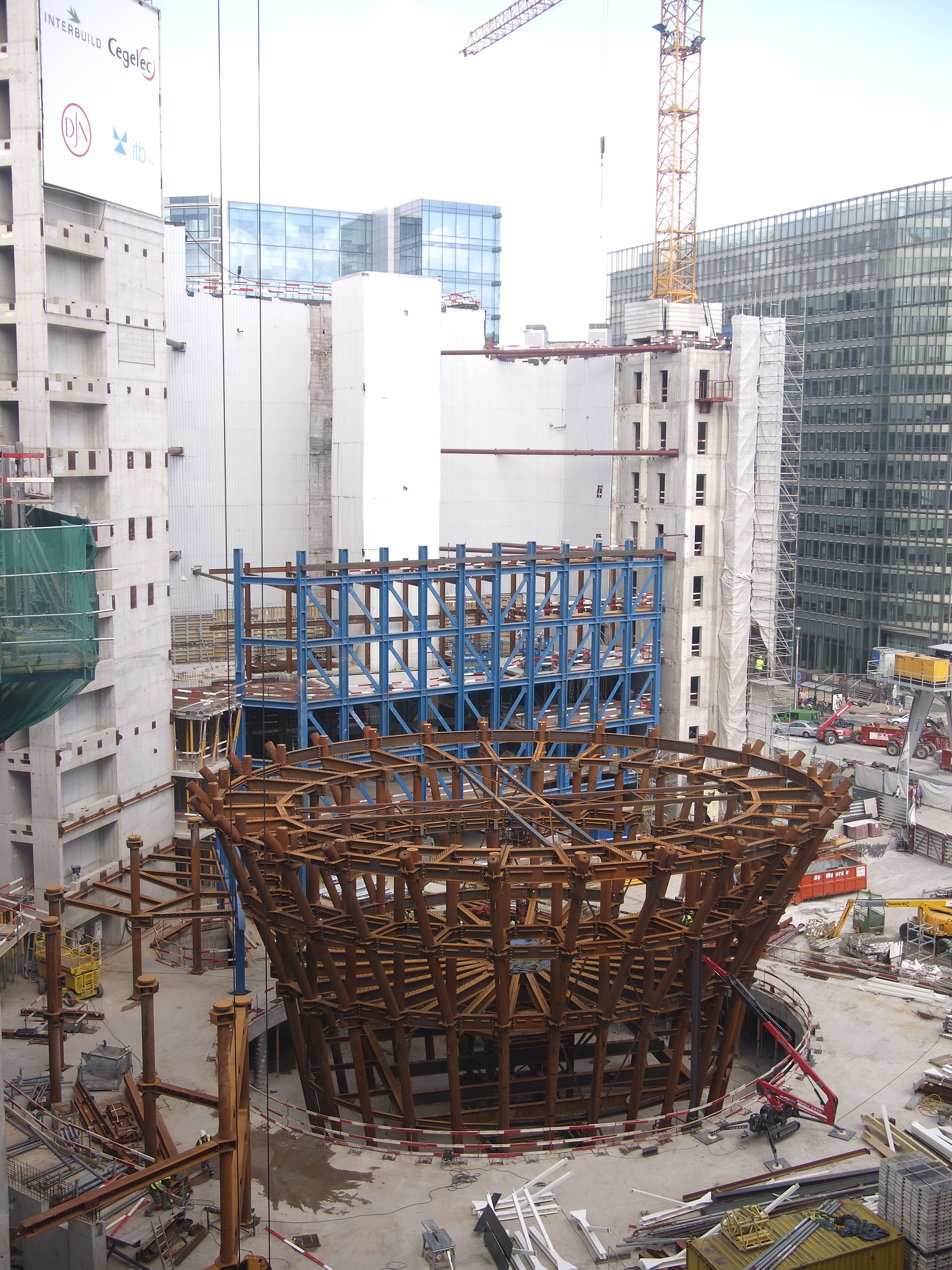
The Europa building under construction in 2012

A pan-European competition was opened to redesign Bloc A of the Résidence Palace to suit the needs of the institutions. As the original Art Deco façades of the Résidence Palace were listed as historic monuments on 22 April 2004, competition rules stated that these had to be retained. In 2005, it was announced that a team involving the architect Philippe Samyn and Partners (architects and engineers), lead and design partner, in collaboration with Studio Valle Progettazioni (architects), and Buro Happold (engineers) had succeeded in submitting the winning design.

The design for what was to be later named the Europa building, involved the demolition of the 1960s extension, and the construction of a large glass-cubed atrium connecting the two renovated wings of the original 1920s L-shaped building. Within the atrium was to be constructed a lantern-shaped structure housing the main meeting rooms where the EU's delegations to the European Council and Council of the EU would meet. Due to EU leaders desire for the building to be eco-friendly, the design was adapted to include solar panels on the roof and recycle rain water.

Construction work on the Europa building began in 2007, with the building originally planned to be finished and inaugurated by 2012. However, due to setbacks and modifications to the design following the evolution of the European Council's needs as an institution during the Lisbon Treaty reforms, the building was completed in December 2016. Philippe Samyn and Studio Valle Progrettazioni received worldwide praise for the clever design. Nonetheless, in 2019, it emerged that the building had been constructed with unpaid work and illegal labour from mainly Bulgarian workers.

== Features ==
A defining characteristic of the Europa building is the use of striking colour compositions designed by the painter Georges Meurant. The lead architect, Philipe Samyn, wished to break with the visual "uniformity" of other EU buildings, believing that the EU was "not being served well by its blue flag with its twelve stars". Further, he believed it "too bland an image of the multiple institutional, social, cultural constellations that structure European conscience". Samyn, inspired by the boldness of the Dutch architect Rem Koolhaas' 2002 "barcode" flag, commissioned Meurant to reflect the national heraldic symbols and flags, of the 28 member states in their diverse proportions and colours. Meurant's orthogonal polychrome grid designs appear over ceilings in meeting rooms, doors, carpet flooring in conference rooms, as well as in the corridors, press room, catering facilities and elevators. Samyn and Meurant saw this as a way to not only bring more light and a warmer atmosphere into the building, and particular in the meeting rooms, which for security reasons had to remain windowless, but also to create a visual message, of "permanent creative effort and political debate" befitting a polyglottic diverse Union.

Block C of the building is used as a working area for journalists and media teams. Block C's unit sizes range from 20 to 200 m^{2} (220 to 2,150 sq ft). The largest tenant overall is the UN Regional Information Center while the German press agency DPA is the largest journalism client. Europe is, by far, the most common continent represented through tenants, but there are three overall thanks to the presence of The New York Times and Saudi Arabia's MBC Group.

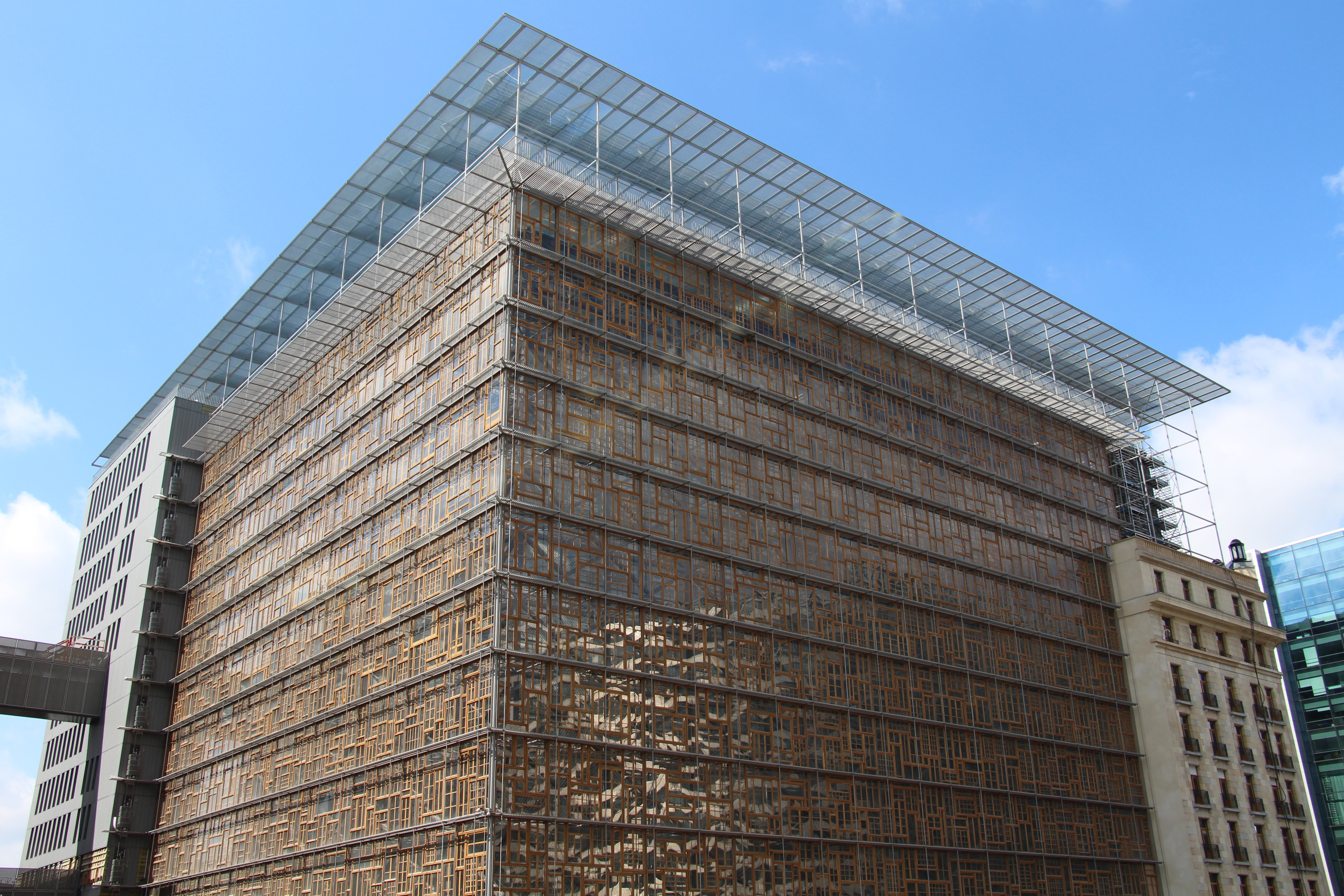
External view of the Europa building prior to its completion

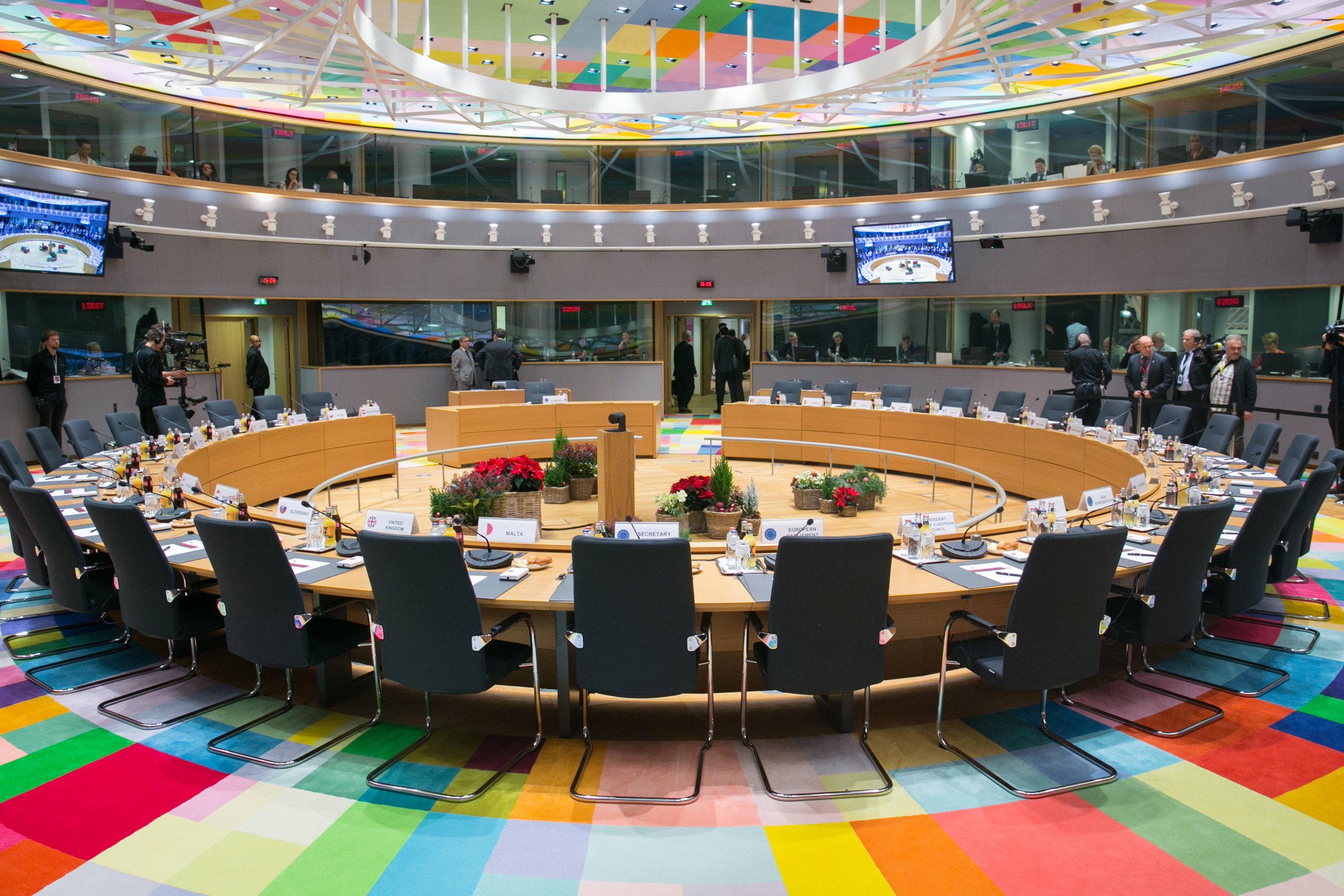
Main meeting room featuring colour compositions designed by Georges Meurant

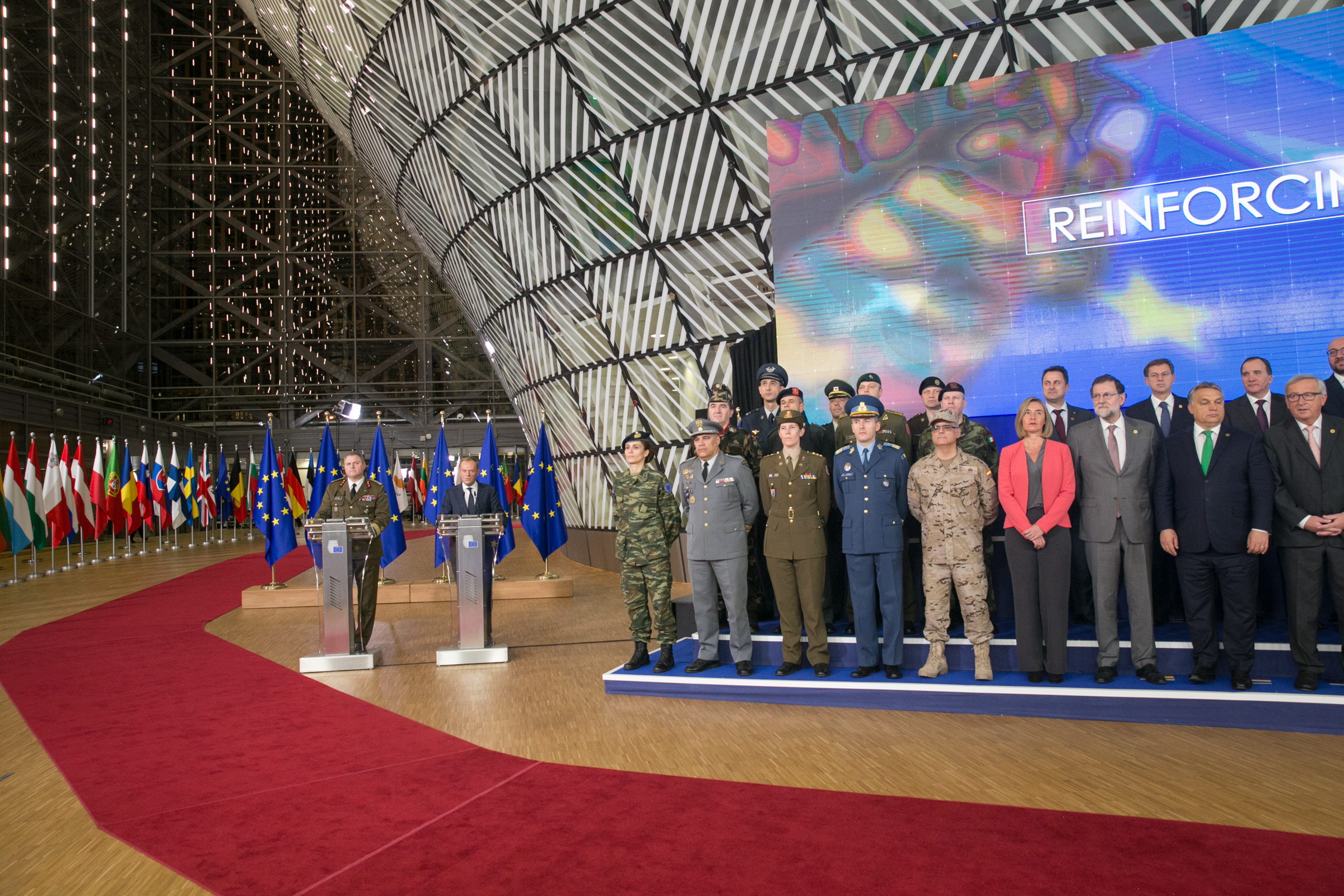
Internal view of the grand entrance atrium showing the lantern-shaped structure

== See also ==
- Lex building
- Institutional seats of the European Union
- Art Deco in Brussels
- History of Brussels
