= International Press Center (Brussels) =

Organization

The Résidence Palace - International Press Center (IPC) is a facility, hub and venue for international journalists located in Brussels, Belgium. The IPC was founded on an initiative by the Belgian Federal Government to improve its media capabilities. It is an autonomous service of the General-Directorate for External Communications, which reports back to the Prime Minister's office. It is based in Bloc-C of the Résidence Palace, a 1920s Art Deco building, on Rue de la Loi. The location was chosen for its close proximity to Belgian Federal Ministries, and EU institutions. Since 2017, the seat of the European Council and Council of the European Union, frequented by high-profile European politicians for international summits, is based adjacent to the premises, in the Europa building. The opening of the press centre coincided with the start of the Belgian Presidency of the Council of the EU on 2 July 2001.
