= Federal Institute for Sustainable Development =

Belgian federal government service

Federal Institute for Sustainable Development [FISD]
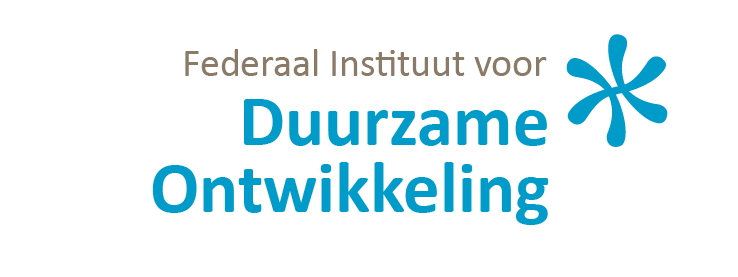
- FIDO logo in Dutch

Agency overview
- Formed: 2014
- Jurisdiction: Federal Government of Belgium
- Headquarters: rue Ducale 4 1000 [/Brussels/] - // Belgium //; 50.846389°N 4.367268°E
- Employees: 12
- Minister responsible: Marie-Christine Marghem, Minister for Energy, the Environment and Sustainable Development
- Agency executive: Dieter Vander Beke
- Website: http://ifdd.belgium.be

The Federal Institute for Sustainable Development (FISD) assists the Belgian Federal Government in the preparation and enforcement of policy decisions related to sustainable development.

== History of European Sustainable Development ==
The history of the ESDN goes back to 2002, when public administrators from several EU Member States, in charge of national sustainable development (SD) strategies, met for the first time to exchange their experiences in the Netherlands. Since then, annual conferences have taken place across Europe.

With the Vienna meeting in 2003, the target group of the conferences was broadened considerably. Besides the co-coordinators of national SD strategies and the national coordinators of EU environmental integration and SD policies, experts from the European Commission, representatives from various National Councils for Sustainable Development, and national members of the SD Working Group of the European Environment and Sustainable Development Advisory Councils (EESDAC) have joined the meetings.

Meanwhile, the annual conferences that facilitate an exchange of experience and knowledge in various ways have resulted in an informal network of SD strategy coordinators and other sustainability experts. A key purpose of the European Sustainable Development is to develop this exchange further in order to make SD strategies more effective. At the European Sustainable Development Network Conference in Windsor, UK on July 14 and 15, 2005, delegates supported the idea of strengthening the network by establishing a Steering Group and a permanent support mechanism for the ESDN - the “ESDN Office”.

== Organization ==
The FISD is divided into three units, who implement the service's key activities under the guidance of an editor:

- Strategy and planning: This unit focuses on policy preparing, coordination, and follow-up of the sustainable development component of Regulatory Impact Analysis.
- Social responsibility: Initiates projects for the promotion of social responsibility of organizations including environmental management, public procurement, food policy, events, ISO26000, and Global Reporting Initiative (GRI).
- Communication: This unit deals with the FISD communication strategy and overseeing the various channels of communication as well as monitoring supported projects.

== Background ==
The FISD was created by a Royal Decree on 21 February 2014 (recorded in the Belgian Official Journal on 10 March 2014). It is the successor organization to Public Service for Programming Sustainable Development, set up to meet Belgian commitments given during the World Summit on Sustainable Development in Johannesburg, South Africa in 2002.

Operationally, while having the status of a separate service, the FISD is attached to the Federal Public Service for the Chancellery of the Prime Minister; consequently, having its own budget and enjoying the operational support (primarily for staff administration, ICT and the budget) of the Chancellery.

== Key dates ==
- 1997: The federal sustainable development strategy was developed pursuant to a law designed to coordinate the federal sustainable development policy.
- 2000: Approval of the 1st federal sustainable development plan (2000 – 2004).
- 2002: Creation of the Public Service for Programming Sustainable Development (PSP SD).
- 2004: Creation of sustainable development units within the federal public services.
- 2004: Approval of the 2nd federal sustainable development plan.
- 2005: The federal government decided to incorporate the EMAS environment management system into the federal public services.
- 2005: Organization of the 1st Sustainable Development Day within the federal administration.
- 2006: Approval of the 'Corporate Social Responsibility i.e. CSR / Socially Responsible Investment i.e. SRI' reference framework and, later on in same the year, the CSR action plan.
- 2007: The SDIS (sustainable development impact assessment) was included in the circular covering the operations of the Council of Ministers.
- 2009: Approval of the federal sustainable public procurement action plan
- 2010: Amendment of the 1997 Law on the coordination of the federal sustainable development policy
- 2010: Sustainable organization of the Belgian Presidency of the European Union
- 2011: First federal EMAS benchmarking exercise
- 2011: ISO 26000 pilot projects within the federal public services
- 2011: Start of Sustainable Nutrition guidance scheme in federal staff restaurants
- 2013: The federal government approved the long-term sustainable development approach
- 2013: Second federal EMAS benchmarking exercise
- 2014: The PSP SD became the Federal Institute for Sustainable Development (FISD)
- 2014: The sustainable development impact assessment was replaced by the regulatory impact analysis (seeking the same objective, subject to some minor practical variations, of raising public policymaking standards by undertaking a preliminary analysis of a project's potential implications in a wide range of economic, social and environmental areas).
- 2014: Pilot project on sustainability reporting according to GRI-4
- 2015:

== Federal sustainable development policymakers ==
- 2020-present day: Zakia Khattabi, Minister for Climate, Environment, Sustainable Development and the Green Deal
- 2014-2020: Marie-Christine Marghem Minister for Energy, the Environment and Sustainable Development
- 2013-2014: Servais Verherstraeten (CD&V) - Servais Verherstraeten (CD&V) – State Secretary for Sustainable Development
- 2011-2013: Steven Vanackere (CD&V) - Minister for Finance and Sustainable Development
- 2007-2011: Paul Magnette (PS) - Minister for Climate and Energy Policy
- 2004-2007: Els Van Weert (Spirit) - State Secretary for Sustainable Development and the Social Economy
- 2003-2004: Freya Van den Bossche (SP. A) Minister for the Environment, Consumer Protection and Sustainable Development
- 1999-2003: Olivier Deleuze (ECOLO): State Secretary for Energy and Sustainable Development
- 1995-1999: Jan Peeters (SP): State Secretary for Security and the Environment
