= Director of Chancery =

The office of Director of Chancery (or Chancellory), the keeper of the Quarter Seal of Scotland, was formerly a senior position within the legal system of Scotland. The medieval post, latterly an office at General Register House, Edinburgh, was abolished by the Reorganisation of Offices (Scotland) Act 1928 and provision made for the functions to be transferred to the Keeper of the Registers and Records of Scotland, the Principal Extractor of the Court of Session, the Sheriff Clerk of Chancery and the sheriff clerks of counties.

The Scottish chancery was responsible for draughting, issuing and recording royal charters (e.g. charters of novodamus), patents of dignities (see Letters patent), gifts of offices, remissions, legitimations, presentations, commissions, brieves (brief warrants) and others crown writs appointed to pass the Great Seal or the Quarter Seal of Scotland.

The quarter seal of Scotland is now kept by the Keeper of the Registers of Scotland.

== Office holders ==
- James Colville (died 1540), administrator, lord of session, and diplomat
- Thomas Bellenden of Auchnoule (c. 1485 – c. 1547), ambassador to England
- John Bellenden (c. 1510 – 1576), Lord Justice Clerk
- George Buchanan (1506–1582), historian and humanist scholar
- John Scot, Lord Scotstarvit (1585–1670), judge and satirist

== See also ==
- Chancery (medieval office)
- Lord Chancellor of Scotland
