= Jean-Laurent Le Geay =

French architect (c. 1710 – after 1786)

Jean-Laurent Le Geay (French pronunciation: [ʒɑ̃ lɔʁɑ̃ lə ʒɛ]; c. 1710 – after 1786) was a French neoclassical architect with an unsatisfactory career largely spent in Germany. His artistic personality remained shadowy until recently, though he was allowed to have had numerous pupils among the avant-garde of neoclassicism. He won the Prix de Rome in architecture in 1732, which, after an unaccountable delay, sent him for study to the French Academy in Rome from December 1738 to January 1742, when the Director, Jean François de Troy, remarked of him on his departure "il y a du feu et du génie". After he returned to Paris, there is no record of him, but about 1745 he was in Berlin, where he published eight etchings (1747–48) of plans and elevations for St Hedwig's Church (today's St. Hedwig's Cathedral), Berlin, which he produced in collaboration with Georg Wenzeslaus von Knobelsdorff, until recently the chief architect to Frederick II of Prussia; the church was eventually built to a modified version of the plan, by Johann Boumann, from June 1748, and Johann Gottfried Büring, in 1772–3.

Le Geay served as architect to Christian Ludwig II, Duke of Mecklenburg-Schwerin from October 1748 until the Duke's death in 1756. For him he designed the formal water-garden at Schwerin, but built nothing; his project for Ludwigslust remained on paper, and his assistant, Johann Joachim Busch began the work in 1763, after Le Geay's departure. In 1756 he was appointed first architect to Frederick of Prussia. For Frederick he designed a Communs (or service-wing), in the form of semicircular colonnades flanked by domed and porticoed pavilions, to stand before the Neues Palais, Potsdam; the project was realized in 1765-66 to slightly altered designs by Carl von Gontard. He added a ballroom to the schloss at Rostock (Eriksen 1974; Erouart 1982) but after quarrelling with the King in 1763, Le Geay seems to have built little.

He spent two years, 1766–67, in England (Eriksen 1974:200), fruitlessly, though Sir William Chambers took the opportunity to copy some of his drawings, then returned to Paris, where he published four extravagantly idiosyncratic suites of etchings of fountains, ruins, tombs, and vases, dated 1767-68, which were collected as Collection de Divers Sujets de Vases, Tombeaux, Ruines, et Fontaines Utiles aux Artistes Inventée et Gravée par J.-L. Le Geay, Architecte (1770). They provide a large array of neoclassical motifs in the goût grec, but their presumed origin in Rome in the 1740s, has been disproved (Erouart 1982), though they show the influence of Giambattista Piranesi.

Le Geay taught Étienne-Louis Boullée, Pierre-Louis Moreau-Desproux, Marie-Joseph Peyre, and Charles De Wailly, through whom his influence on neoclassical developments was more important than the direct influence of anything he built. Gilbert Erouart, examining Le Geay's surviving paintings and drawings, concluded that, rather than the eminence grise of neoclassicism, Le Geay's contribution had been limited to painterly techniques of picturesque presentation drawings.
