= Pierre Contant d'Ivry =

French architect and designer (1698-1777)

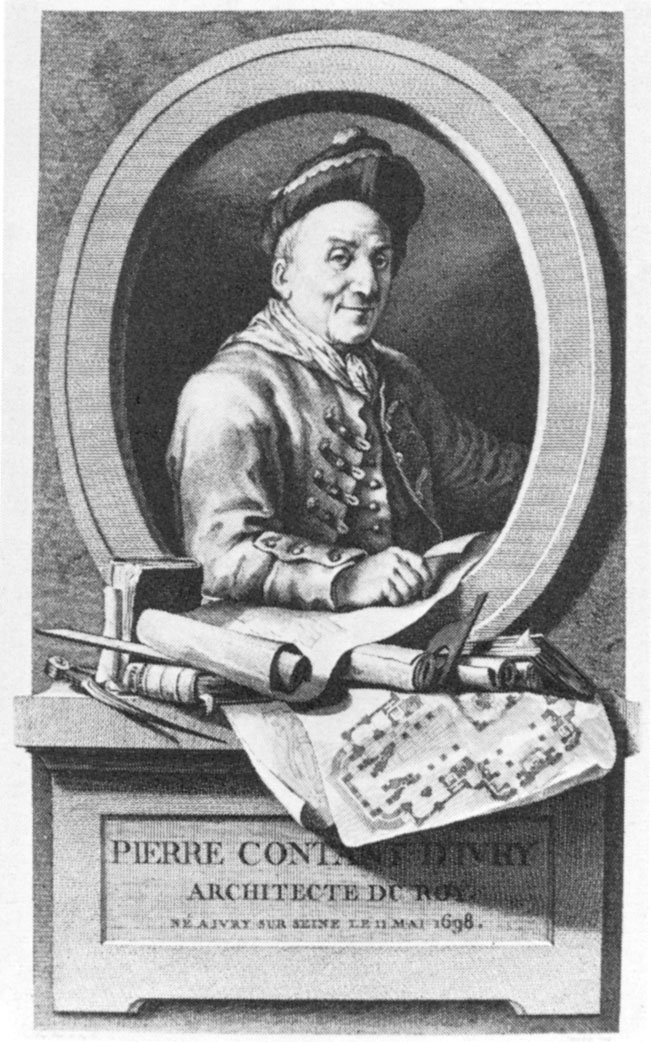
Frontispiece of Pierre Contant d'Ivry's Oeuvres d'architecture (1769) with his portrait and showing his revised plan for the Église de la Madeleine

Pierre Contant d'Ivry (11 May 1698 in Ivry-sur-Seine – 1 October 1777 in Paris), was a French architect and designer working in a chaste and sober Rococo style and in the goût grec phase of early Neoclassicism.

== Early career ==
An Architecte du Roi from 1728, he spent his career working for the French Crown and for an aristocratic private clientele: the contrôleur-général des finances Machault d'Arnouville, the princes de Soubise and de Croÿ, and baron Bernstorff, the Danish ambassador. Though he was not formally received into the Académie royale d'architecture until 1751, he was the architect attached to Louis François, Prince of Conti, between 1737 and 1749. He was replaced in this position by Jean-Baptiste Courtonne.

== Palais-Royal ==
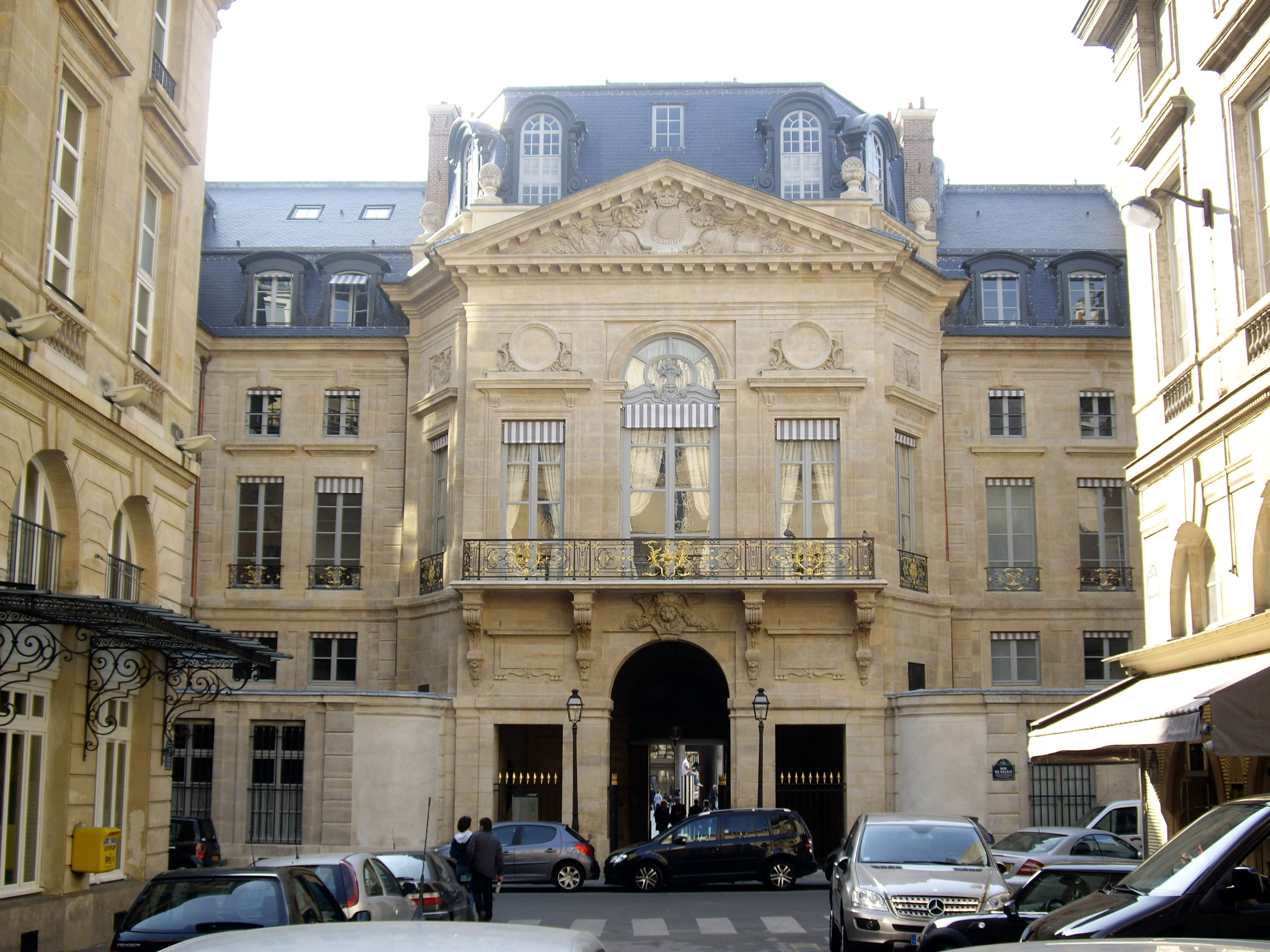
Contant d'Ivry's avant corps on the Rue de Valois

Later Contant d'Ivry worked for Louis-Philippe, duc d'Orléans, for whom he transformed interiors of the Palais-Royal, Paris, in 1754, designs that were widely admired and published by Diderot and d'Alembert in the Encyclopédie, 1762, where Jacques-François Blondel praised their "correct middle pathway between two excesses, that of the heavy weight of our ancients and that of frivolity". Surviving examples include the dining room of the Duchesse d'Orléans (now the Salle du Tribunal des Conflits of the Conseil d'État), which is in a neo-classical style with pilasters, and another of her rooms (now the Salle des Finances), in which his surviving decoration of the ceiling and door panels is lighter and more reminiscent of the earlier French Regency period. Contant d'Ivry was also responsible for the exteriors of the northern part of the east wing (now on the Rue de Valois), the avant corps of which, "with its giant balcony brackets and rather inventive detailing, combines Rococo-style decorative charm with a certain Classical solidity in its massing."

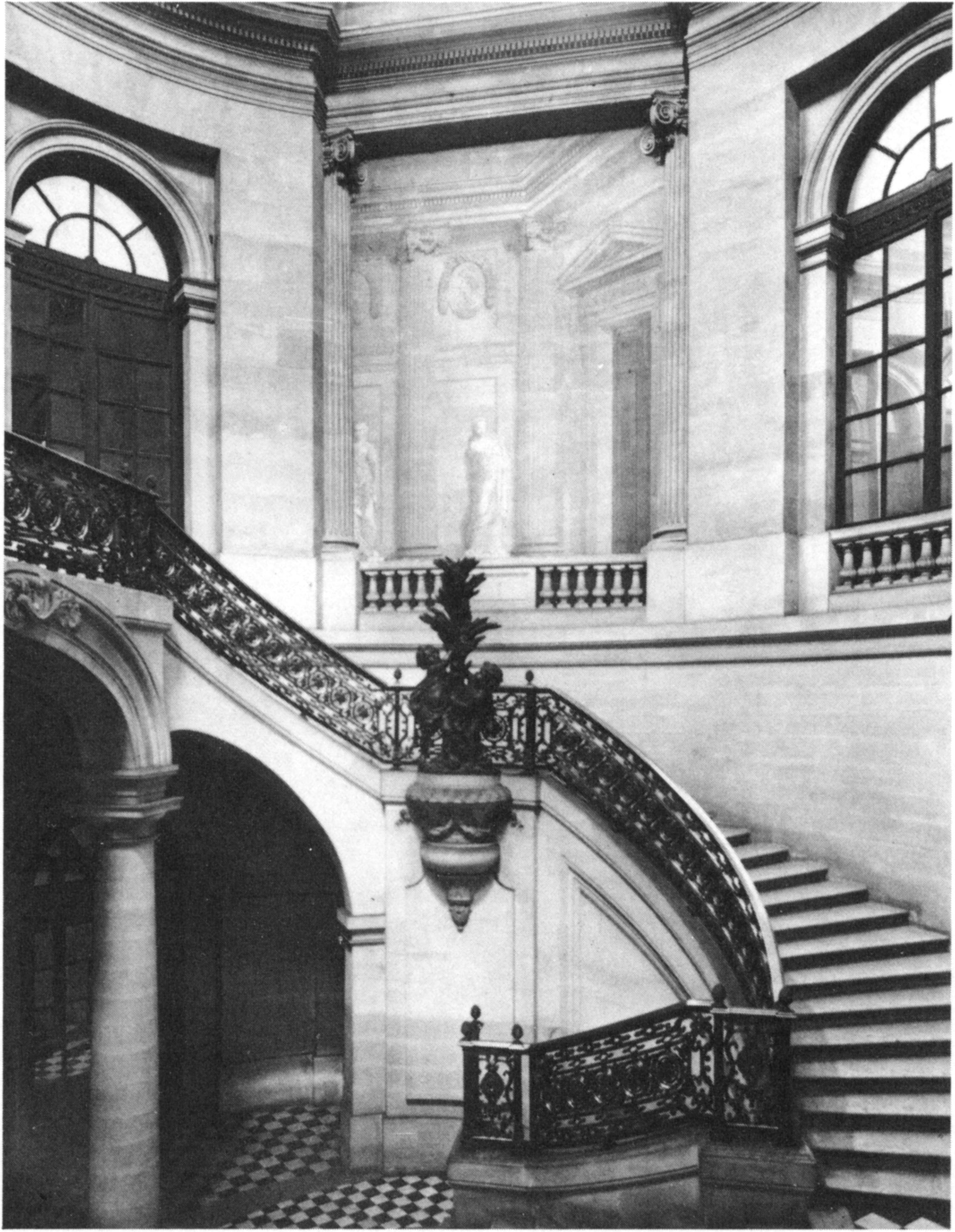
Northern flight of the Palais-Royal staircase

In 1763 a fire which started in the east wing in the opera house, the Salle du Palais-Royal, destroyed not only the theatre but also the adjoining sections of the palace. While the municipality of Paris was responsible for the opera house and hired its own architect, Pierre-Louis Moreau-Desproux, who also designed the new facades on the Rue Saint-Honoré side of the building, Louis Philippe engaged Contant d'Ivry, who designed the interiors of the reconstructed corps de logis, the facades of the Cour d'Honneur (on the garden side), and a grand staircase, the "splendid escalier d'honneur, [which] with its domed covering and dramatic curved descent, is justly famous."

== Église de la Madeleine ==
In 1757, he presented a project for the new Église de la Madeleine in Paris, for which he drew inspiration from Jacques-Germain Soufflot's Église Sainte-Geneviève. Though the foundation stone was laid by Louis XV in 1763, funds lagged, and after Contant d'Ivry's death, the plans were modified, then the partially built structure was razed and begun anew.

== Principal commissions ==
- Château de Bizy, Vernon (Eure), for the maréchal de Belle-Isle (ca 1740, partly destroyed).
- Hôtel d'Évreux, 19 Place Vendôme, Paris : grand staircase and boiseries (1747).
- Château d'Arnouville at Arnouville-lès-Gonesse, for Jean-Baptiste de Machault d'Arnouville. He collaborated there with Jean-Michel Chevotet, (1751–1757).
- Palais-Royal, Paris: In 1752 he provided décors for two main rooms, the salle de la section des Finances du Conseil d'État, (notably for the carved fielded panels of its double doors and its ceiling cornice) and the neoclassical salle à manger of the duchesse d'Orléans (now the salle du Tribunal des conflits), one of the earliest neoclassical interiors in Paris. After a fire in 1763, Contant d'Ivry rebuilt the central block, with its facade on the cour d'honneur and the monumental staircase (1765).
- Château de Saint-Cloud
- Project for the Abbey and church of Pentemont, rue de Bellechasse at rue de Grenelle, Paris (published 1769).
- Hôpital général, Valenciennes (1750)
- The new palace Saint-Vaast d’Arras, Arras.
- Église Saint-Wasnon, dedicated to Saint Wasnon, at Condé-sur-l'Escaut (1751).
- Château de Stors (Oise): Chapel for the prince de Conti.

== Garden designs ==
- Château de Chamarande (Essonne).He provided a theater en plein air, an orangerie, a buffet d'eau, belvedere and designs for an ornamental vegetable garden.
- Château d'Heilly (Somme).
- Château de Bizy at Vernon (Eure).
- Château des Conti at L'Isle-Adam (Val-d'Oise).
- Château de Stors at L'Isle-Adam (Val d'Oise). The park and the monumental terraces.
- Ekolsund Castle, outside Enköping Municipality, Uppsala County, Sweden. Plan for redesign of the gardens (1757).
Projected plan for the Ekolsund gardens, 18 July 1757.

== Furniture designs ==
- Console table, gilded wood, c 1750-55; set of four wall lights, 1756. The Getty Center, Los Angeles.

== Gallery of designs for churches ==
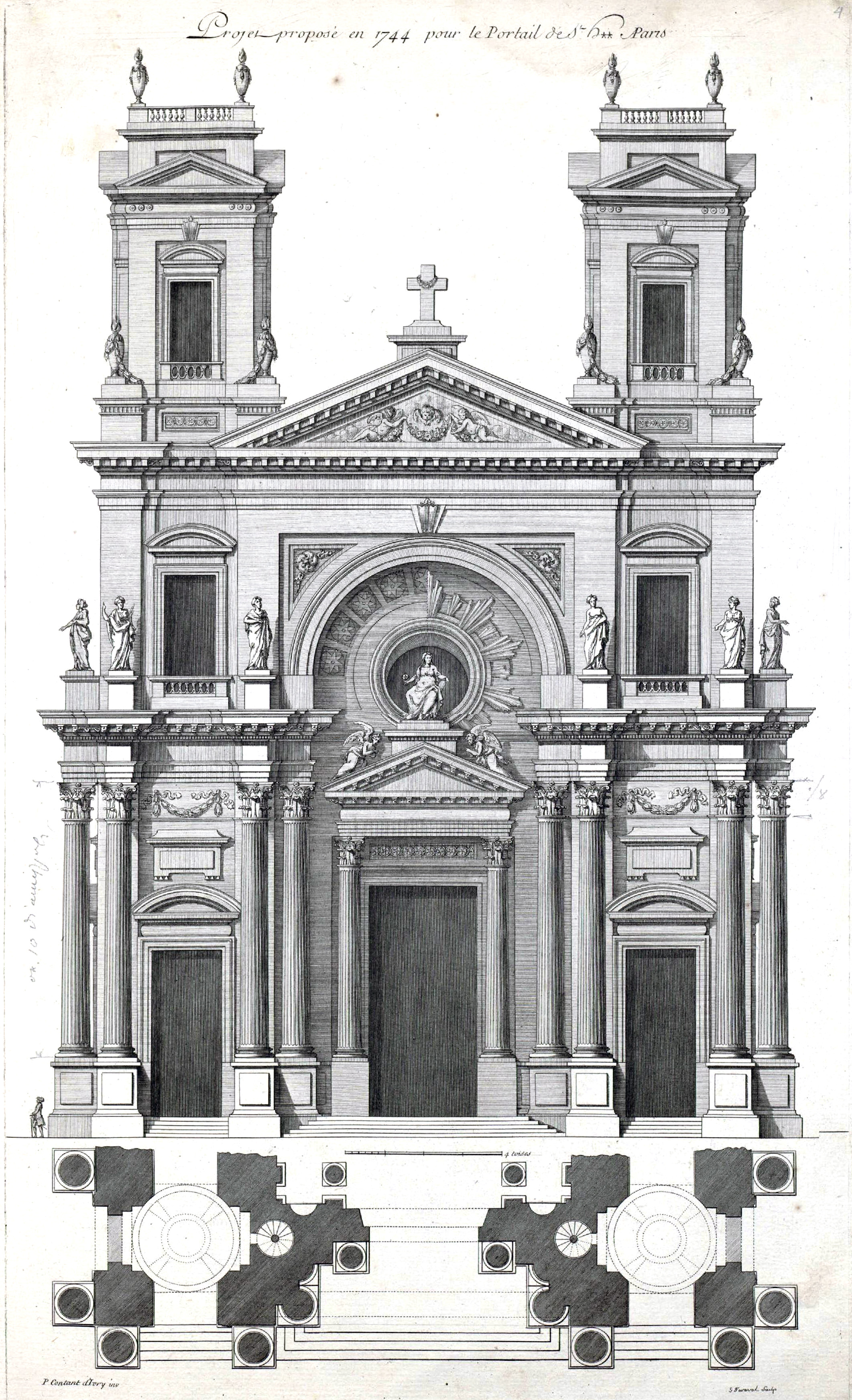
Project for Saint-Eustache, Paris (1744)

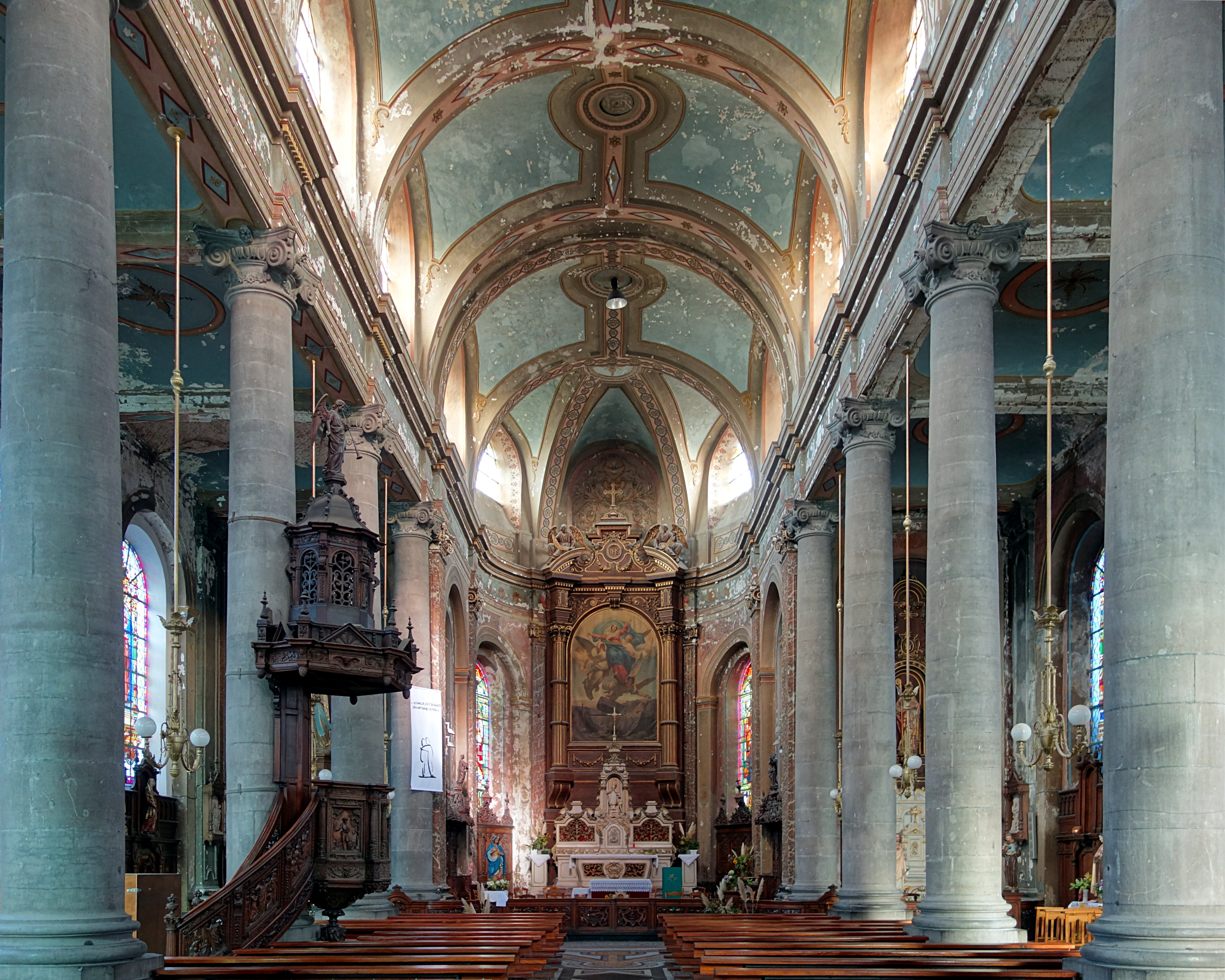
Interior of Saint-Wasnon, Condé-sur-l'Escaut (1751)

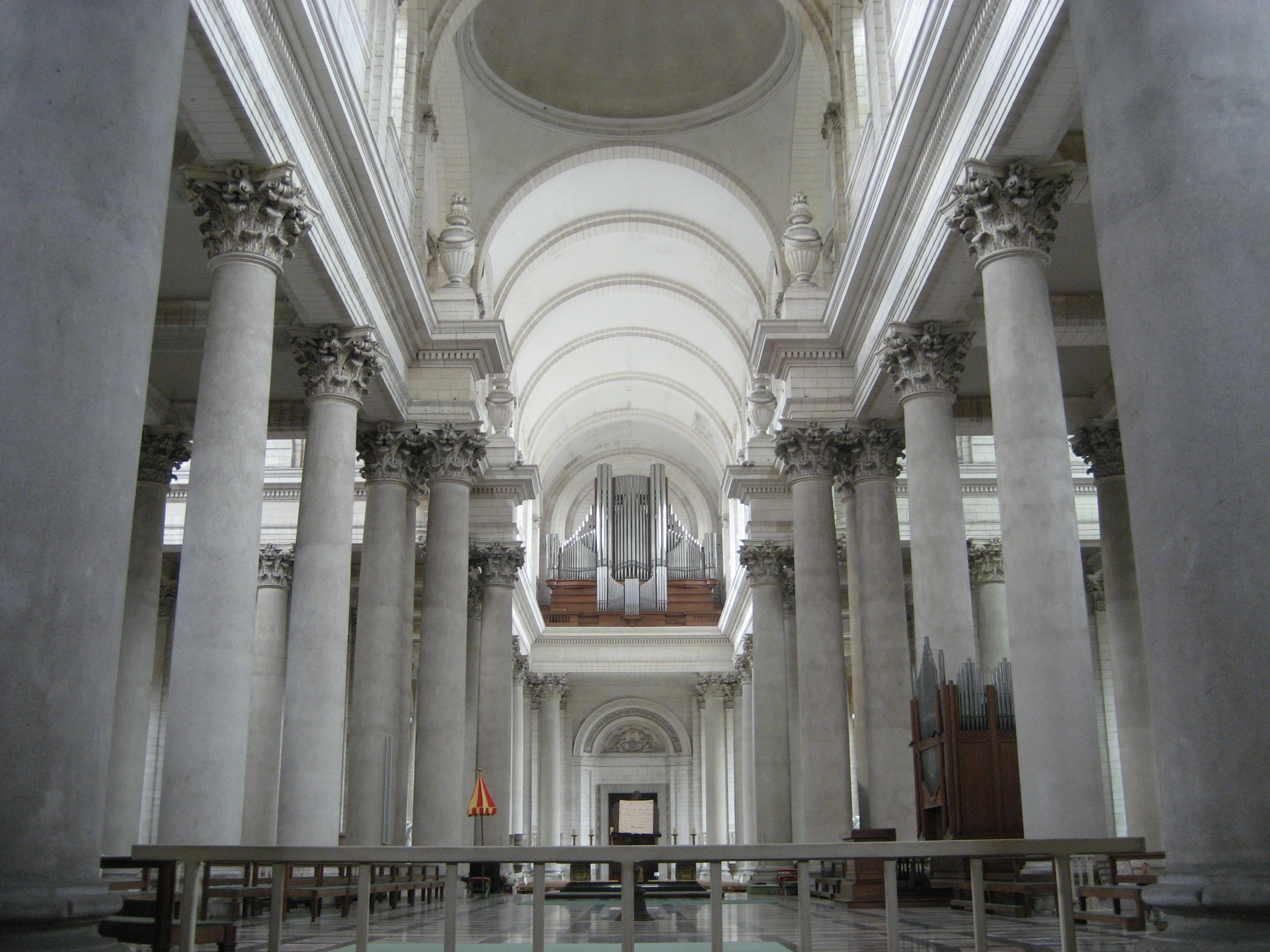
Interior of Arras Cathedral (1755)

== Sources ==
- Ayers, Andrew (2004). The Architecture of Paris. Stuttgart; London: Edition Axel Menges. ISBN 978-3-930698-96-7.
- Baritou, Jean-Louis (1987). Chevotet, Contant, Chaussard: un cabinet d'architectes au Siècle des lumières. Lyon: La Manufacture. ISBN 978-2-904638-98-5.
- Blondel, Jacques-François (1752–1756). Architecture françoise, 4 volumes. Paris: Charles-Antoine Jombert. Vols. 1, 2, 3, & 4 at Gallica.
- Bourbon de Conti, Louis François de, editor (2000). Les Trésors des Princes de Bourbon Conti. Paris: Editions Somogy. ISBN 978-2-85056-398-0.
- Braham, Allan (1980). The Architecture of the French Enlightenment. Berkeley: University of California Press. ISBN 978-0-520-06739-4.
- Dassas, Frédéric (1995). Les Résidences du Prince de Conti, mémoire de maîtrise d’histoire de l’art sous la direction d’Antoine Schnapper, Paris IV-Sorbonne.
- Ericson, Svend (1974). Early Neo-Classicism in France. London: Faber. ISBN 978-0-571-08717-4.
- Gallet, Michel (1995). Les architectes parisiens du XVIIIe siècle: dictionnaire biographique et critique. Paris: Editions Mengès. ISBN 978-2-85620-370-5.
- Joudiou, Gabrielle (1987). "Pierre Contant d’Ivry" in Baritou 1987, pp. 86–181.
- Joudiou, Gabrielle (1993). "Contant d’Ivry et les jardins classiques au XVIIIe siècle " in Jardins du Val-d’Oise.
- Joudiou, Gabrielle (1998). "L’art des jardins chez Contant d’Ivry" in Annales du Centre Ledoux II.
- Joudiou, Gabrielle (2000). L’Architecte Contant d’Ivry à L’Isle-Adam et à Stors in Bourbon de Conti 2000, pp. 107–111.
- Olivier-Valengin, Elyne (2000). "Le château des princes de Bourbon Conti à L’Isle-Adam" in Bourbon de Conti 2000, pp. 112–123.
