= Odéon-Théâtre de l'Europe =

Theatre in Paris, France

- Previous names: Théâtre-Français du Faubourg Saint-Germain (1782-1789); Théâtre de la Nation (1789-1793); Théâtre de l'Égalité (1794-1796); Théâtre de l'Impératrice et Reine (1808-1818); Second Théâtre-Français (1819-1990)
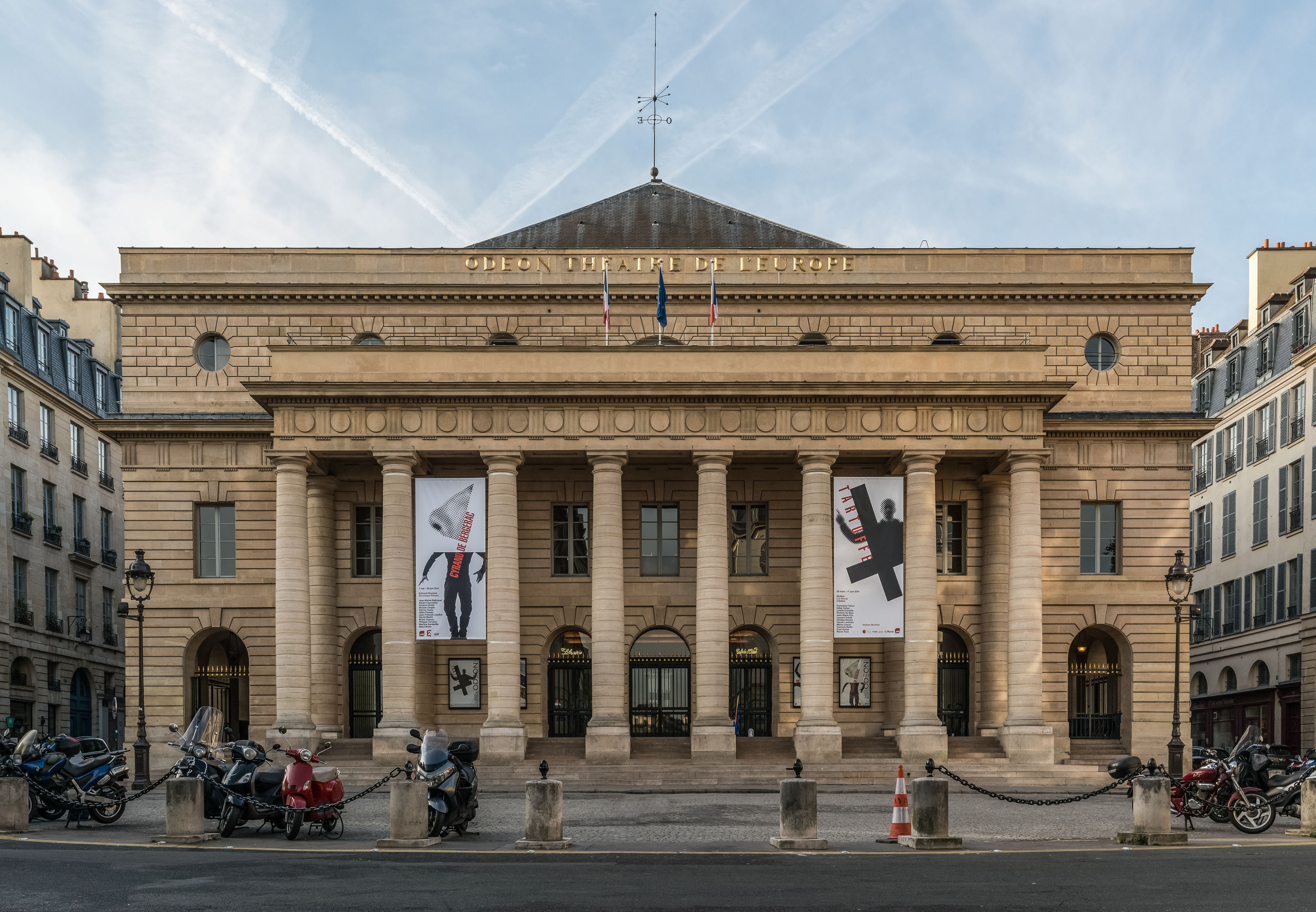
- Facade of the Odéon-Théâtre de l'Europe
- Interactive map of Odéon-Théâtre de l'Europe
- Address: 2 rue Corneille, 6th arrondissement of Paris; Paris
- Coordinates: 48°50′58.2″N 2°20′19.5″E
- Capacity: 800
- Public transit: Odéon

Construction
- Opened: 1782
- Reopened: 1808
- Rebuilt: 1819
- Architect: Pierre Thomas Baraguay

Website
- www.theatre-odeon.eu

The Odéon-Théâtre de l'Europe (French pronunciation: [ɔdeɔ̃ teɑtʁ d(ə) løʁɔp]; "European Music Hall"; formerly the Théâtre de l'Odéon [teɑtʁ d(ə) lɔdeɔ̃]; "Music Hall") is one of France's six national theatres. It is located at 2 rue Corneille in the 6th arrondissement of Paris on the left bank of the Seine, next to the Luxembourg Garden and the Luxembourg Palace, which houses the Senate.

== First theatre ==
The original building, the Salle du Faubourg Saint-Germain, was constructed for the Théâtre Français between 1779 and 1782 to a Neoclassical design by Charles De Wailly and Marie-Joseph Peyre. The site was in the garden of the former Hôtel de Condé. The new theatre was inaugurated by Marie-Antoinette on April 9, 1782. It was there that Beaumarchais' play The Marriage of Figaro was premiered two years later. On April 27, 1791, during the Revolution, the company split. The players sympathetic to the crown remained in the theatre in the Faubourg Saint-Germain. They were arrested and incarcerated on the night of September 3, 1793, but were allowed to return a year later. In 1797, the theater was remodeled by the architect Jean-François Leclerc and became known as the Odéon, but it was destroyed by a fire on March 18, 1799.

== Second theatre ==
An 1808 reconstruction of the theater designed by Jean-François Chalgrin (architect of the Arc de Triomphe) was officially named the Théâtre de l'Impératrice, but everyone still called it the Odéon. It burned down in 1818.

== Third theatre ==
The third and present structure, designed by Pierre Thomas Baraguay, was opened in September 1819. In 1990, the theater was given the sobriquet 'Théâtre de l'Europe'. It is a member theater of the Union of the Theatres of Europe. As a member of the Union of the Theatres of Europe, the Odéon regularly participates in international artistic exchanges, co-productions, and multilingual theatrical projects.

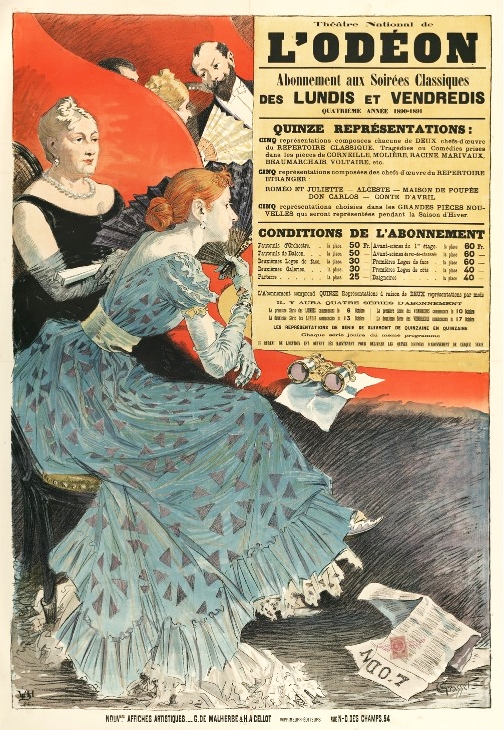
Eugène Grasset poster, 1890

== Access ==
Located near the Metro station: Odéon.

The Line 4 and Line 10 serves Odéon station.

== See also ==
- Hôtel de Condé, previously on the same location

== Bibliography ==
- Carlson, Marvin (1966). The Theatre of the French Revolution. Ithaca: Cornell University Press. OCLC 331216, 559057440, 622637342.
- Hemmings, F. W. J. (1994). Theatre and State in France, 1760–1905. New York: Cambridge University Press. ISBN 978-0-521-03472-2 (2006 reprint).
- Wild, Nicole (2012). Dictionnaire des théâtres parisiens (1807–1914). Lyon: Symétrie. ISBN 9782914373487. OCLC 826926792.
