= Arras Cathedral =

Cathedral in Arras, France

Cathedral of Our Lady and Saint Vaast Cathédrale Notre-Dame-et-Saint-Vaast
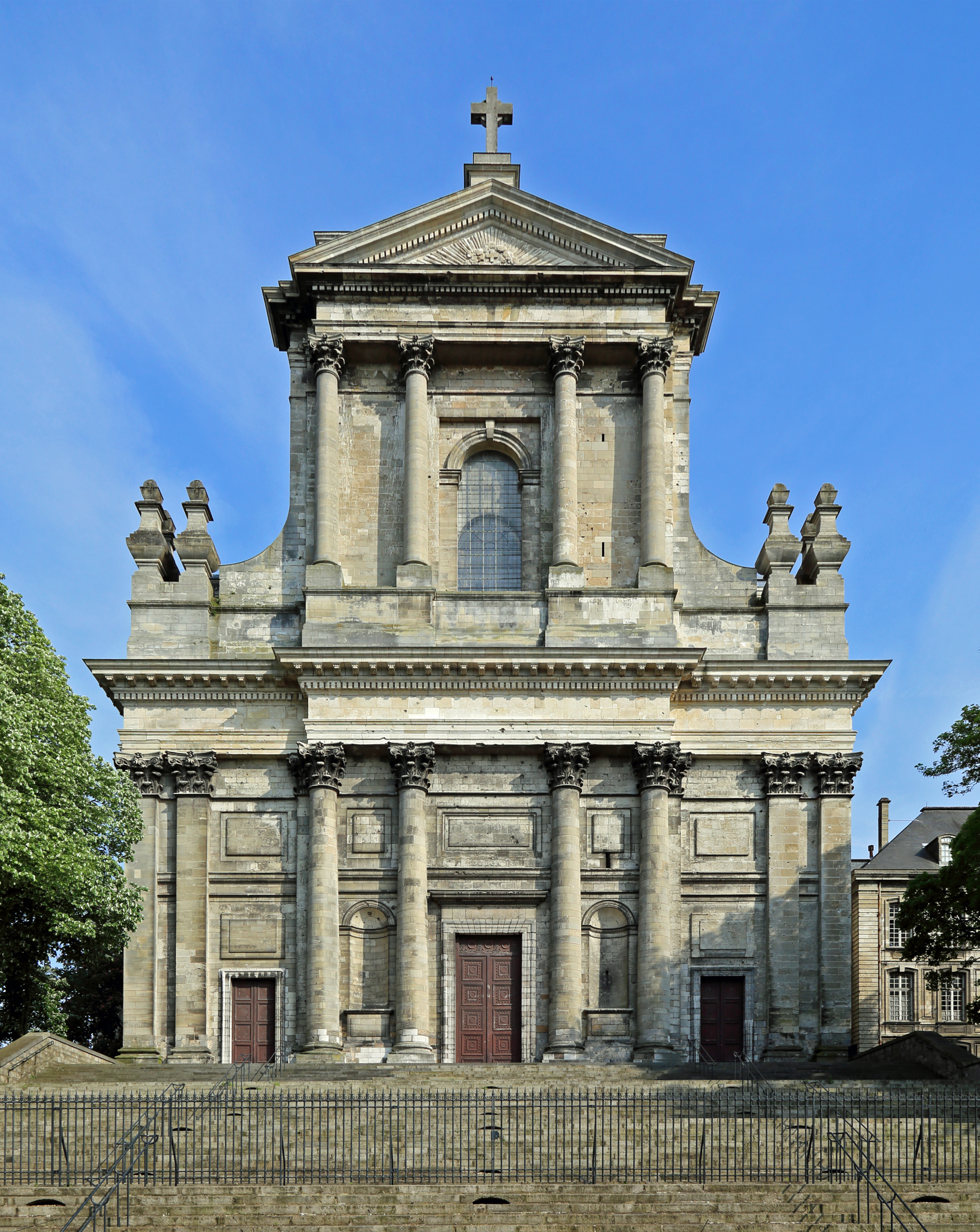
- Arras Cathedral

Religion
- Affiliation: Catholic Church
- Diocese: Diocese of Arras
- Rite: Latin Rite
- Ecclesiastical or organizational status: Cathedral
- Year consecrated: 1833

Location
- Location: Arras, Pas-de-Calais, France
- Interactive map of Cathedral of Our Lady and Saint Vaast; Cathédrale Notre-Dame-et-Saint-Vaast
- Coordinates: 50°17′35″N 2°46′29″E

Architecture
- Architect: Pierre Contant d'Ivry
- Type: Church
- Style: Gothic, Classical

Arras Cathedral (French: Cathédrale Notre-Dame-et-Saint-Vaast d'Arras) is the Catholic church in the city of Arras, France. The cathedral is the seat of the Bishops of Arras.

== History ==
When the diocese of Arras was renewed in 1094 with Lambert of Guines as its first bishop, the church of Notre-Dame-en-Cité became its first cathedral. The building, constructed between 1030 and 1396, was one of the most beautiful Gothic structures in northern France. The cathedral was the resting place of Louis de Bourbon, Légitimé de France, a legitimated son of Louis XIV and Louise de La Vallière. During the French Revolution, the building was sold on 1 January 1799 to speculators and stripped of valuable fabrics. Three years later, the shell was demolished.

=== Abbey Church of Saint-Vaast ===
The church of the former St. Vaast's Abbey was rebuilt beginning in 1750 in neoclassical style. The design was chosen by the former abbot of St. Vaast's, the Cardinal de Rohan, and is of remarkable simplicity. It is 'a very large building, the erection of which was begun in 1755 from plans by Pierre Contant d'Ivry, the architect who later created designs for the Church of La Madeleine in Paris. The work was interrupted during the Revolution.

After the Revolution, the Abbey Church was designated as to replace the destroyed cathedral in 1804. Work resumed by virtue of a municipal decree dated “Nivôse 27, Year XII”, which ran: “... to erect the edifice, abandoning everything in the original plans connected with decoration and architectural beauty, limiting the work to the requirements of solidity and decency.”

The church was finished in accordance with these prescriptions, being completed in 1834. The interior was of plaster-coated brickwork, whilst the columns were of undressed stone, covered with stone-coloured mortar. The capitals were of stucco-work.'

== Description ==
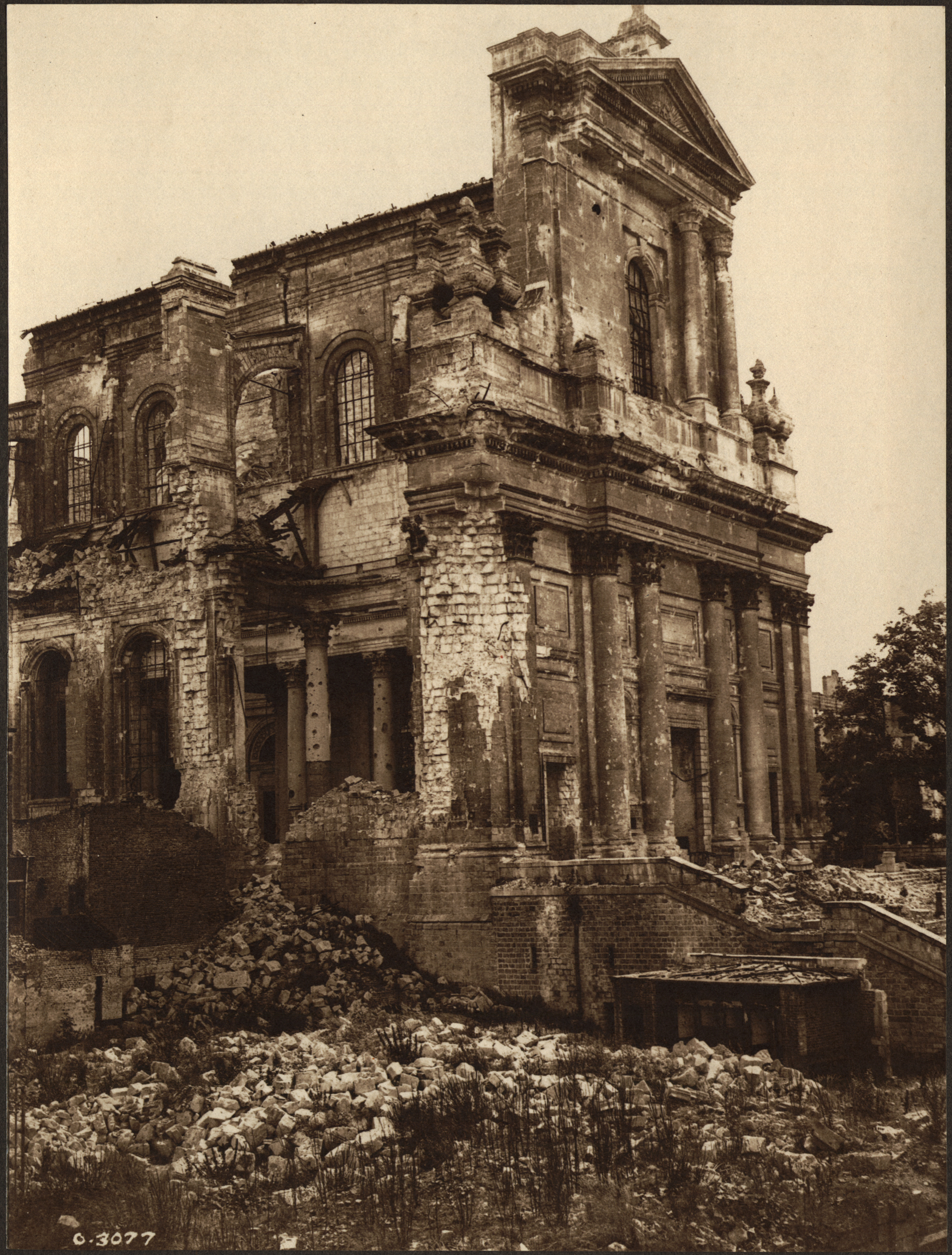
The main entrance to the Arras Cathedral showing the roof completely blown off and the steps covered with fallen masonry, [ca. 1918]

Arras Cathedral was heavily damaged by shelling in April 1917, during the run-up to the Nivelle offensives of World War I, and subsequently rebuilt in its previous form.

A marble statue of the Virgin with Child by Jean-Pierre Cortot was donated by Louis XVIII.

Sculptor Marcel Gaumont did considerable work on the cathedral. The pulpit depicts Christ amongst his disciples and the four evangelists. He also provided the baptismal font which shows on one side the baptism of Jesus by John the Baptist, and on the other Saint Vaast blessing a group of people. Alexandre Descatoire did the Stations of the Cross.

The cathedral is adjacent to the Musée des beaux-arts d'Arras, formerly the Benedictine Abbey of Saint-Vaast.

== Sources ==
- Gameson, Richard (2007). "The Earliest Books of Arras Cathedral". Scriptorium. 61 (2): 233–285. doi:10.3406/scrip.2007.4224.
