= Hôtel de Condé =

Main Paris seat of the princes of Condé

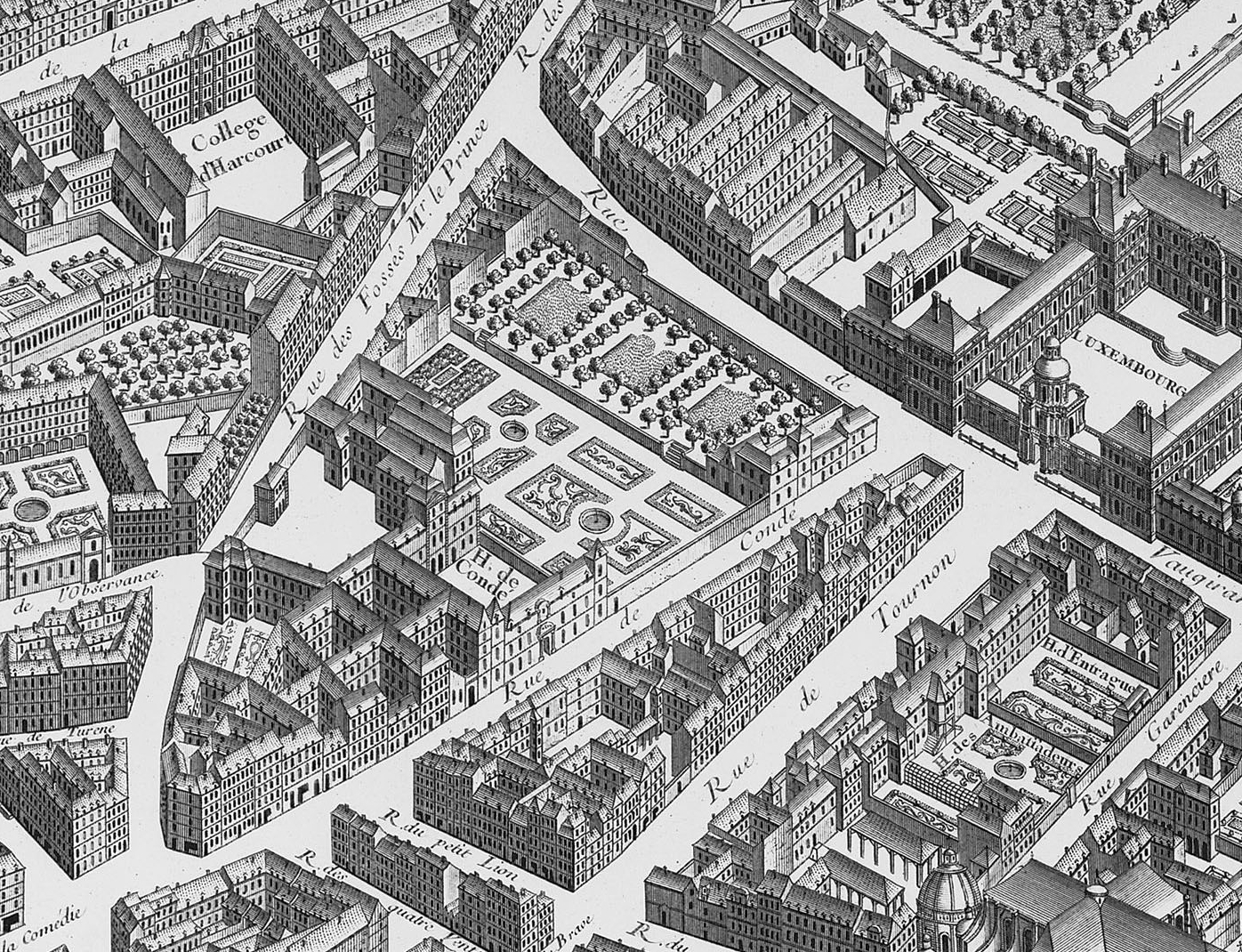
The hôtel de Condé (c. 1736), as depicted on the Turgot map of Paris

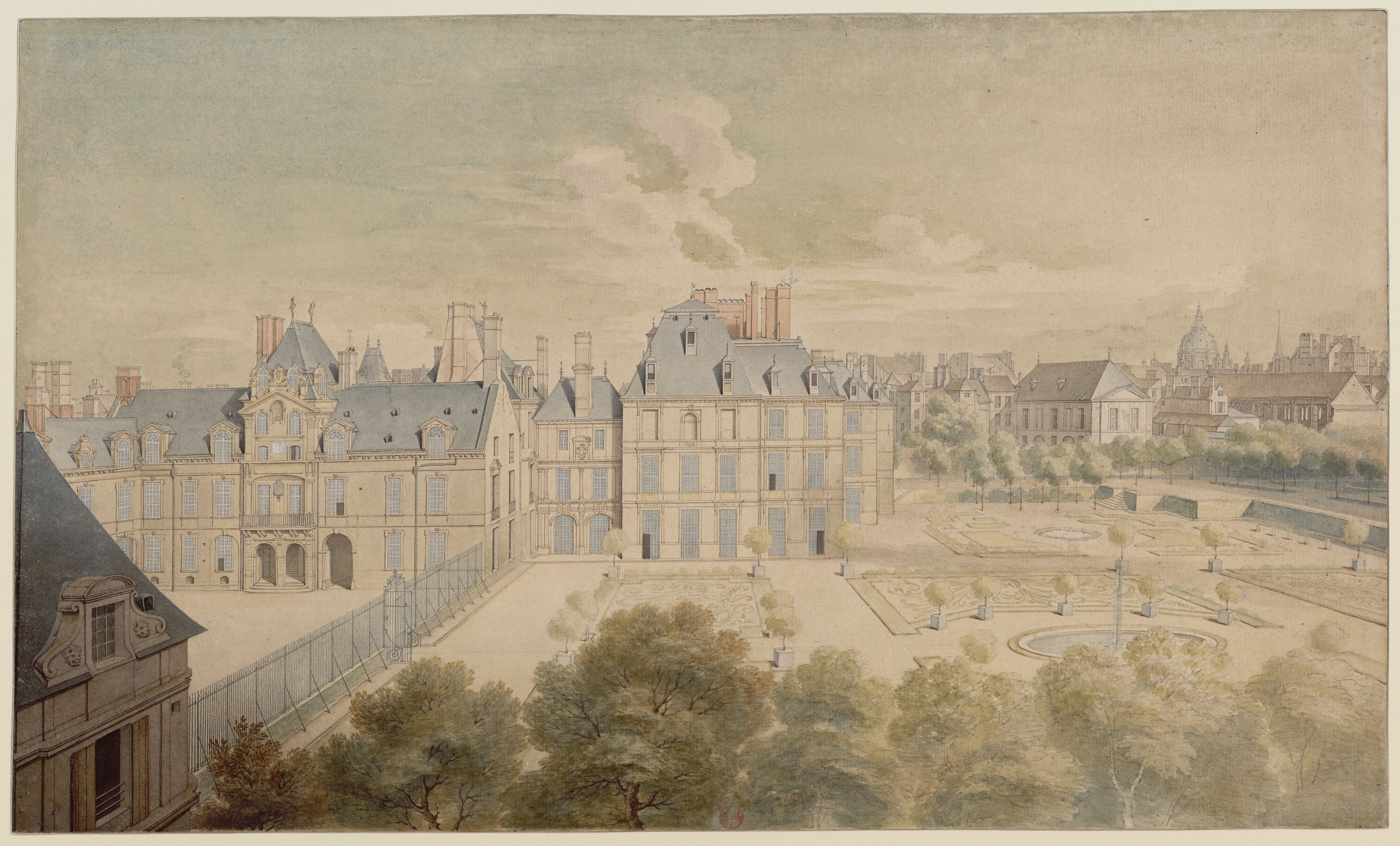
View of the inner courtyard of the hôtel de Condé

The hôtel de Condé (French pronunciation: [otɛl də kɔ̃de]) was a private mansion and the main Paris seat of the princes de Condé, a cadet branch of the House of Bourbon, from 1612 to 1764/70.

The hôtel gave its name to the present rue de Condé, on which its forecourt faced. The théâtre de l'Odéon was constructed in the former gardens of the hôtel particulier in 1779–82.

The hôtel de Condé comprised almost all the terrain in the 6th arrondissement of Paris that is now enclosed within rue de Condé, Vaugirard, and Monsieur-Le-Prince and the crossroads of the Odéon. The property was first built upon, in a suburban environment beyond the city walls of Philippe II, by Antoine de Corbie, premier président of the Parlement of Paris. In the reign of Charles IX the property belonged to the naturalised Florentine banker Albert de Gondi, a favourite of the King. In the ruin of Philippe-Emmanuel de Gondi, father of the Cardinal de Retz, the hôtel was seized.

In 1610 Marie de' Medici gave it to Henri II, prince de Condé in part as recompense for his agreeing to marry Charlotte Marguerite de Montmorency, a former mistress of Henri IV. The hôtel was largely reconstructed by its new owner.

The hôtel de Condé formed a vast ensemble of structures, with wings separated by narrow interior courtyards, with awkward intrusions and party walls; however, the main corps de logis opened upon an extensive parterre garden in the French style, separated from the cour d'honneur by a fine wrought-iron railing. A series of three terraces descended to the rue de Vaugirard, facing the palais du Luxembourg. The garden was so spacious that, when it was necessary to close the jardin du Luxembourg to the public, the gates of the princely residence could be opened, and the crowd could be admitted without the least encumbrance.

Germain Brice, in his 1707 Description nouvelle de la ville de Paris, gave an admiring description of the furnishings of the hôtel de Condé:

'The ceiling of the bedroom and study of Madame la Princesse were painted by de Sève (...) As for the furniture, it is difficult to see richer and more numerous in any other palace. There are also paintings by masters of the first rank, including the Baptism of Our Lord by Albani (...), extraordinary tapestries and more jewellery than in any other place. It also houses a large library of curious books and some of the rarest hand-drawn maps.'

Here, where his mother Marie-Éléonore de Maillé de Carman had a suite of rooms, in her place as lady companion to the princess de Condé, was born the Marquis de Sade.

In 1764 Louis-Joseph, prince de Condé, his mistress, the Princess of Monaco, and other members of the Condé family moved into the palais Bourbon; Louis XV bought the property and its gardens in 1770. On 26 March 1770, an order in council authorised the execution of the theatre project intended for the Comédie-Française, designed by Charles de Wailly and Marie-Joseph Peyre in the terraces of the garden. Previously, Peyre, in his Oeuvres d'architecture (1765), illustrated a project, whether executed or not, for a symmetrical staircase in two curving flights placed in the vestibule of the 'hôtel de Condé'; he had exhibited it to the Académie in 1763; it may have been intended for the prince at the palais Bourbon.

In 1778, Louis XVI offered his brother, the comte de Provence, the Luxembourg and the hôtel de Condé. In 1779 the division of the site into building lots sparked a vast construction project, comparable to that undertaken by the duc de Chartres at the Palais-Royal. Streets were driven through the terrain, including the rue de l'Odéon (at first called rue du Théâtre-Français), the first street in Paris provided with sidewalks, which was opened through the middle of the former hôtel de Condé in 1782, at the same time that the new Théâtre-Français, later called the théâtre de l'Odéon, opened.

== Bibliography ==
- Guides Bleu: Paris, Hachette, 1988
- Dominique Leborgne, Saint-Germain des Prés et son faubourg, Parigramme, 2005
