= Charles de Wailly =

French architect (1730–1798)

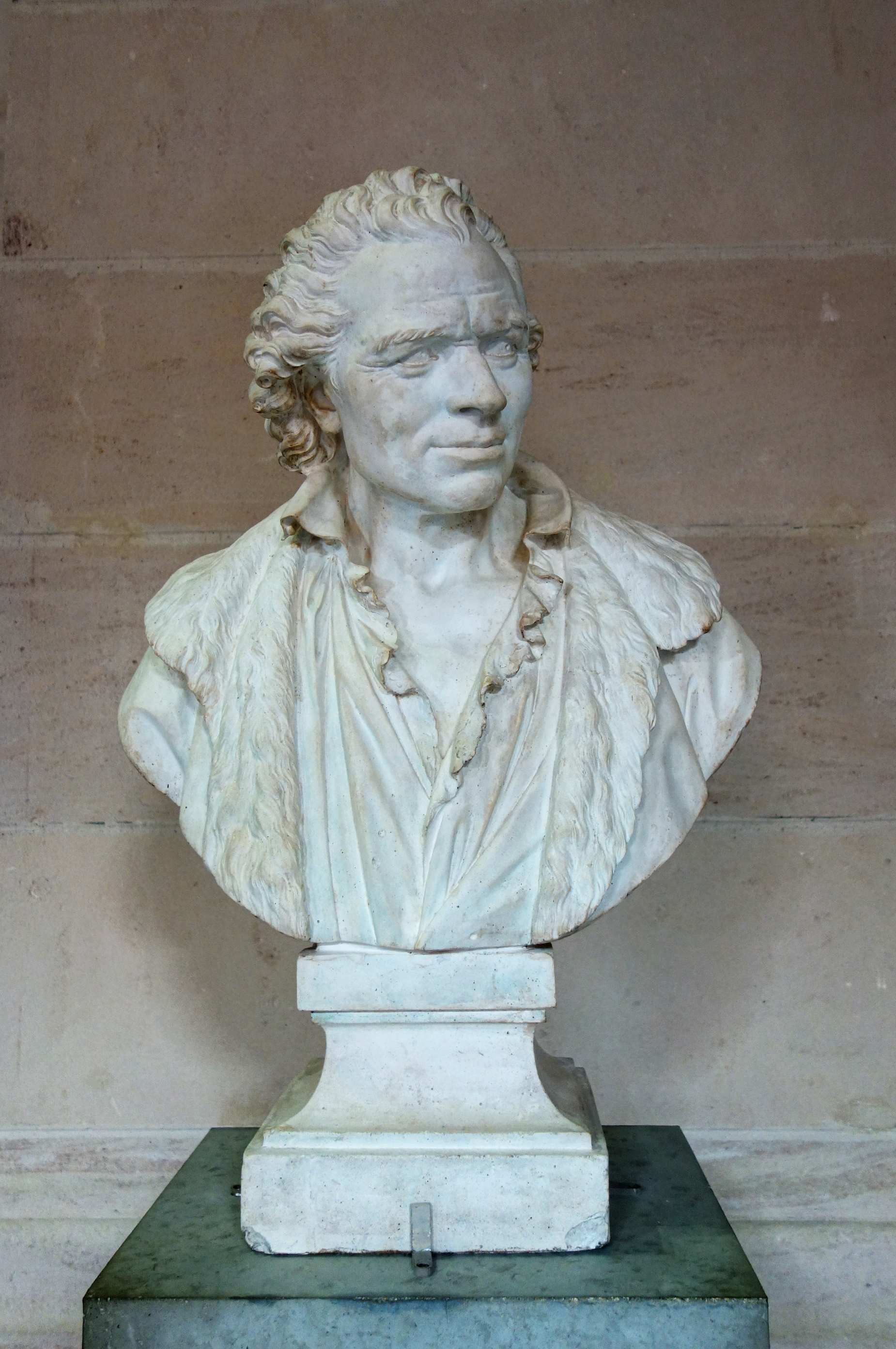
Charles de Wailly (1789), bust by Augustin Pajou

Charles de Wailly (French pronunciation: [ʃaʁl də waji]) (9 November 1730 – 2 November 1798) was a French architect and urbanist, and furniture designer, one of the principals in the Neoclassical revival of the Antique. His major work was the Théâtre de l'Odéon for the Comédie-Française (1779–82). In his designs, de Wailly showed a predilection for the perfect figure, the circle.

== Biography ==
De Wailly was born in Paris. Starting in 1749, he was the pupil of Jacques-François Blondel at l'École des Arts, where he met William Chambers and had as a schoolmate Marie-Joseph Peyre; later he studied with Giovanni Niccolò Servandoni and with Jean-Laurent Le Geay. After having obtained the Prix de Rome for architecture in 1752 he went to the French Academy in Rome for three years until 1755, sharing his prize with his friend Pierre-Louis Moreau-Desproux. Both participated in the excavations at the Baths of Diocletian. In Rome, de Wailly founded a friendship with the sculptor Augustin Pajou, who was to carve his bust and that of his wife and for whom, in 1776, he would build a house adjoining his own, in Paris.

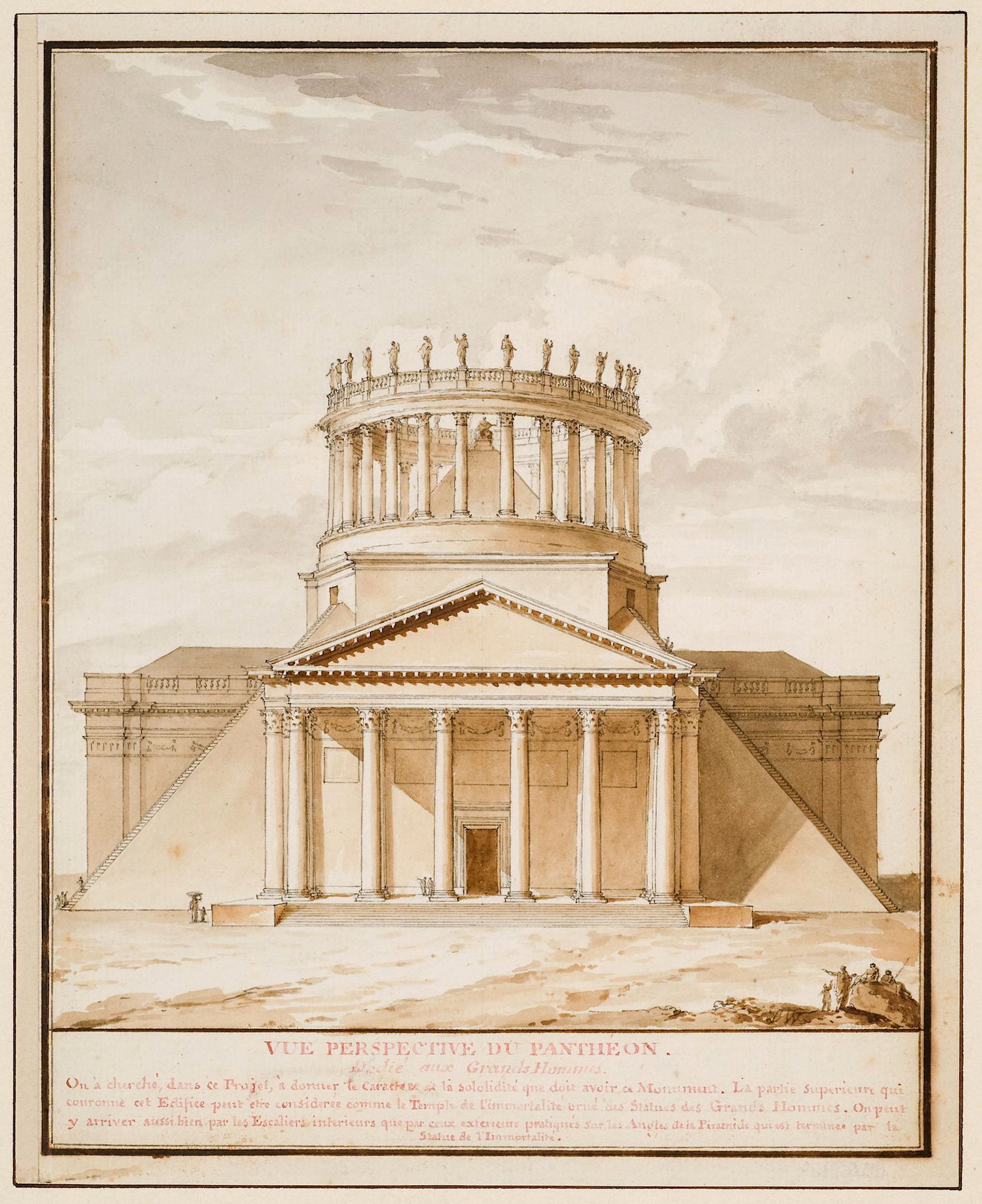
Project for transforming the Panthéon into a temple to the republic.

On his return to Paris, de Wailly showed his mastery of the earliest version of neoclassicism, being called the "Goût grec", by exhibiting a table with a lapis lazuli top and gilt-bronze mounts and a granite vase in the "goût antique" at the Salon of 1761; they were designed to be manifestos of a new taste, as the squib inserted in the Mercure de France states, in a "very noble style, far removed from the frippery manner ("air de colifichet") which has reigned so long in our furnishings."

About 1764, for the sumptuous Hôtel d'Argenson de Voyer, which he remodelled for Marc-René d'Argenson, marquis de Voyez in an advanced neoclassical style, he designed the gilt-bronze mounted marble and porphyry vase on pedestal that is now in the Wallace Collection, London; from de Wailly's drawings the sculptor Augustin Pajou made the wax models for the mounts.

In 1767, de Wailly was accepted as a member of the first class of the Académie royale d'architecture and, in 1771, was accepted in the Académie royale de Peinture et de Sculpture, the only professional architect of the time to win admission, a mark of his great facility as a draughtsman. Henceforth de Wailly regularly exhibited at the Paris Salons his renderings, designs and models. He gained wider publicity when two of his designs were engraved for the Encyclopédie and two more for the monumental Description de la france of the 1780s.

His reputation abroad grew through engravings of his works; he became particularly popular in Russia, where his disciples, some of whom went to Paris to study with him directly, included Vasily Bazhenov, Ivan Starov, and Andrey Voronikhin. Catherine the Great offered him a high post in the Imperial Academy of Arts, St Petersburg, which he refused.

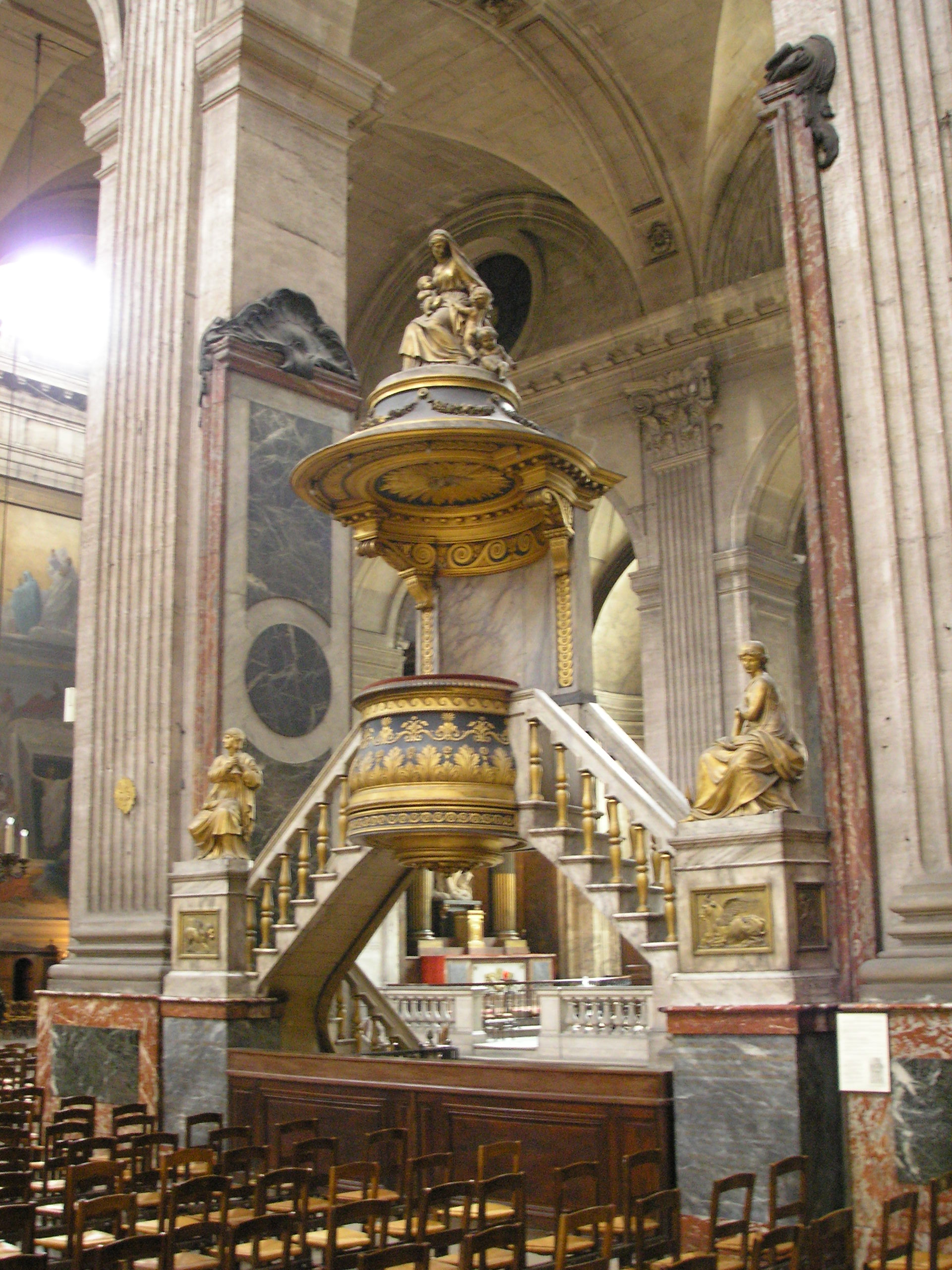
The pulpit, Saint-Sulpice, Paris, 1788-89

In 1772, he was named site architect of the Château de Fontainebleau, jointly with Marie-Joseph Peyre. The following year, he was authorized to leave for a long stay in Genoa, to redecorate the seventeenth-century palace of Cristoforo Spinola in the Strada Nuova, working in tandem with Andrea Tagliafichi: the building was badly damaged in 1942. He was to return on several occasions to work in Italy.

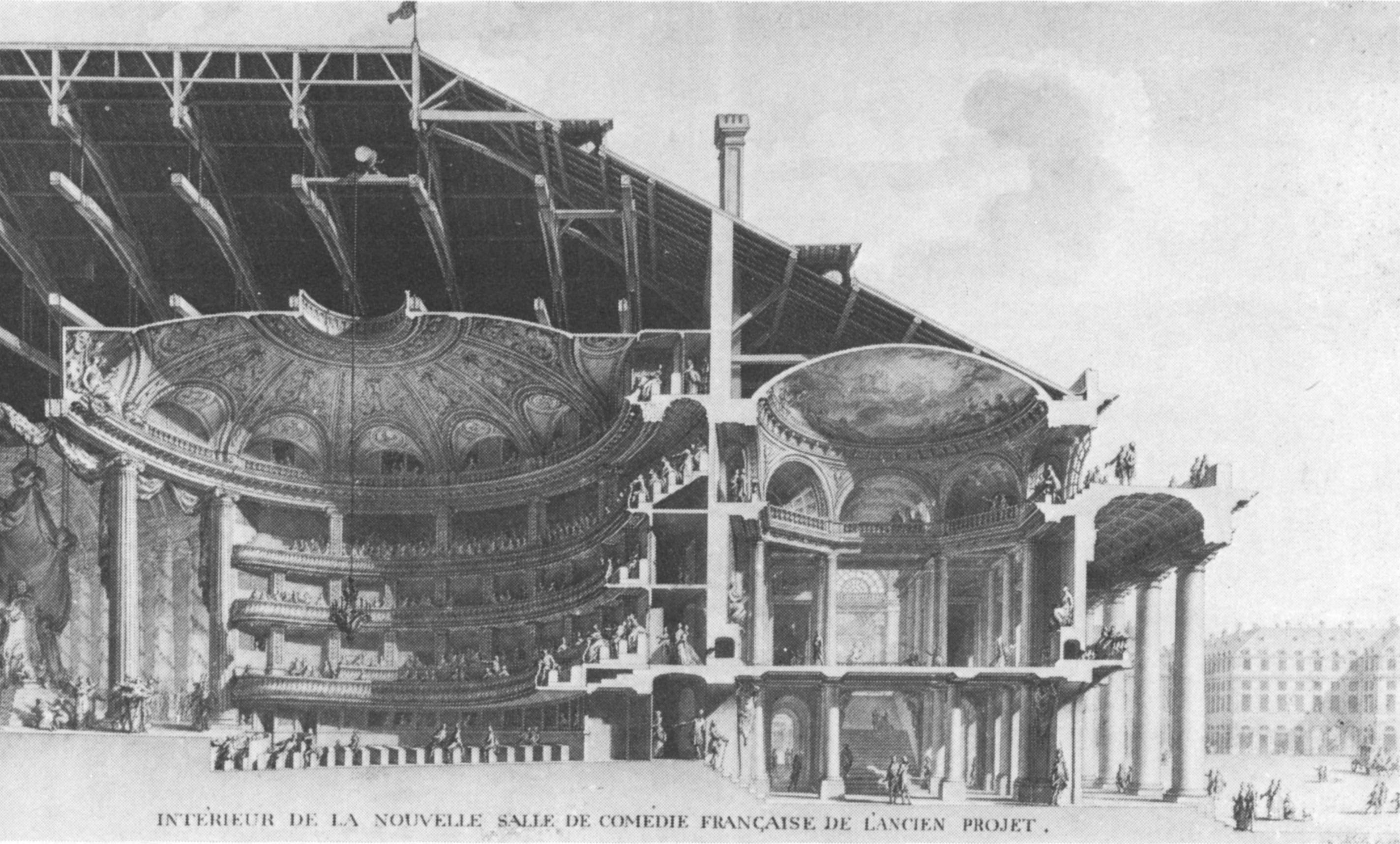
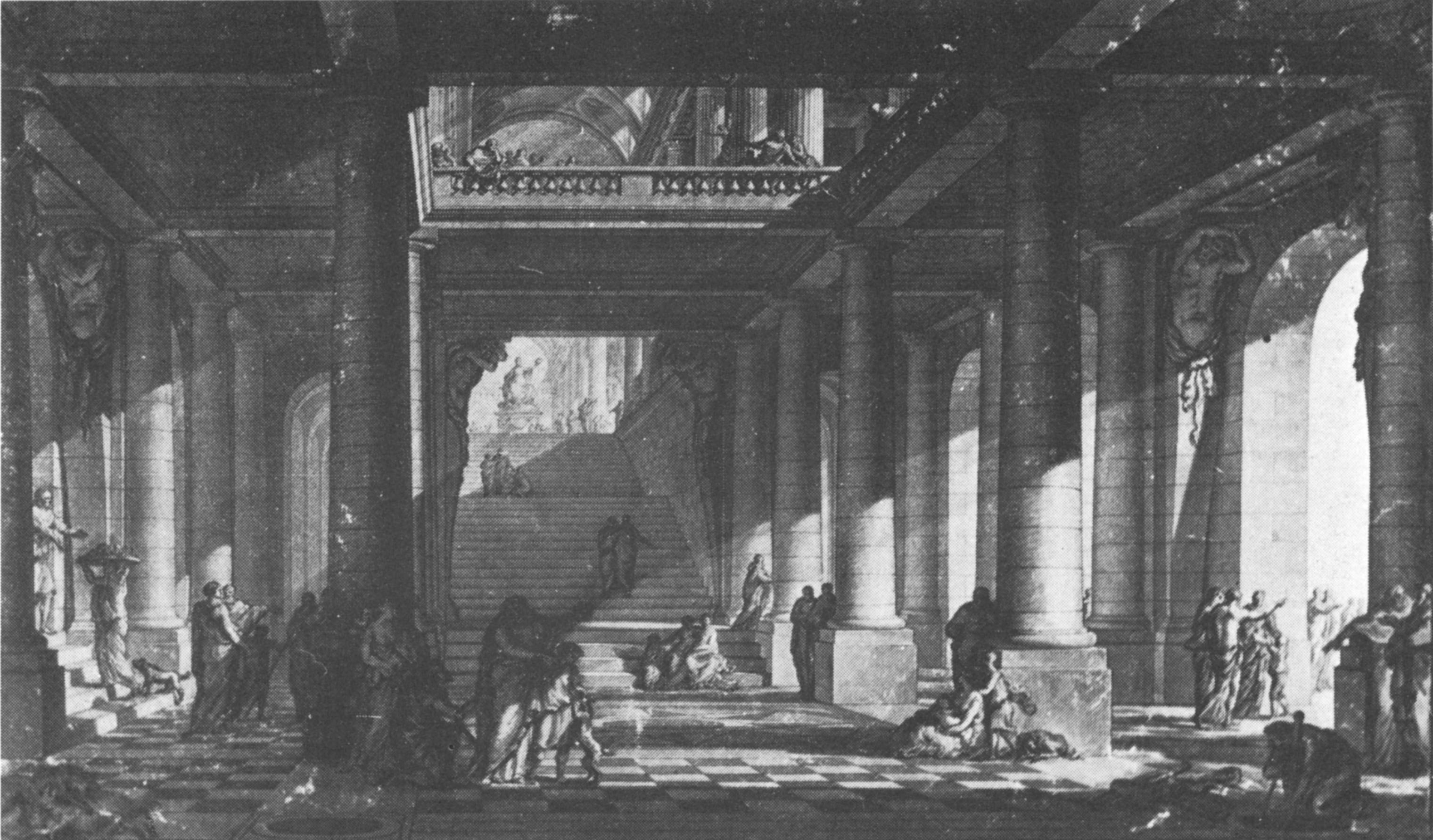
Comédie-Française (Odéon), long section and view of the vestibule, based on the second (1770) project

Noticed by the Marquis de Marigny, brother of Mme de Pompadour and general director of the Bâtiments du Roi, de Wailly worked in the park of Marigny's Château de Menars and, thanks to his support, managed to obtain the commission of a new theatre for the Comédie-Française. In 1779, de Wailly and Peyre built their most famous work, the theatre of Odéon in Paris (see below). De Wailly also designed a project for the Opéra-Comique.

In 1795, he was elected to the Académie des Beaux-Arts – 3rd section (architecture), fauteuil V. With his death, Jean-François Chalgrin succeeded to his seat. He became conservator of the museum of painting in 1795 and was sent to the Netherlands and Belgium to select works of art after the annexation of these countries.

He married Adélaïde Flore Belleville who, after his death, remarried in 1800 to the chemist Antoine François, comte de Fourcroy. He was the brother of lexicographer Noël François de Wailly.

De Wailly died in Paris in 1798.

== Works ==
=== France ===
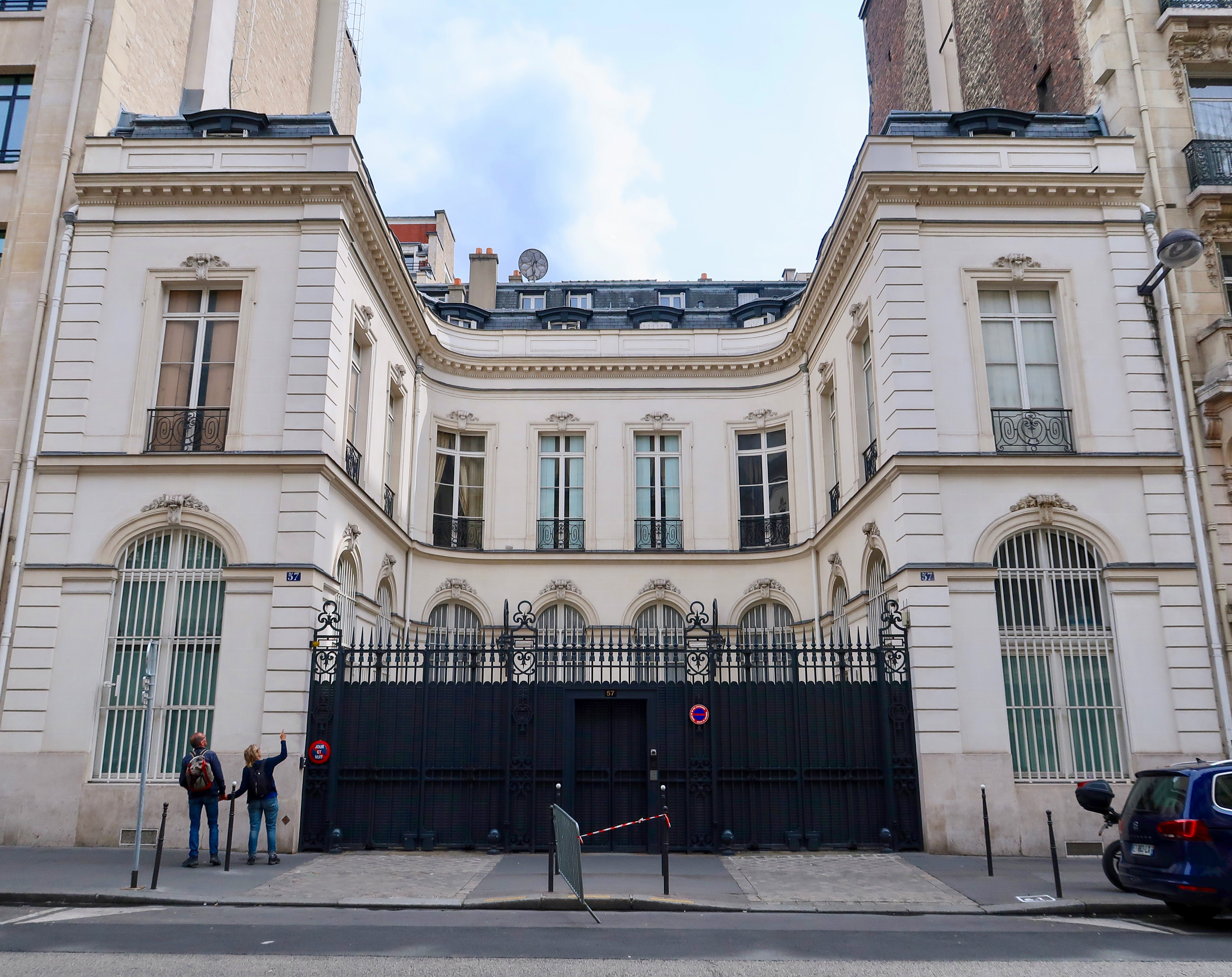
Maison 57 rue La Boétie, Paris, 1776.

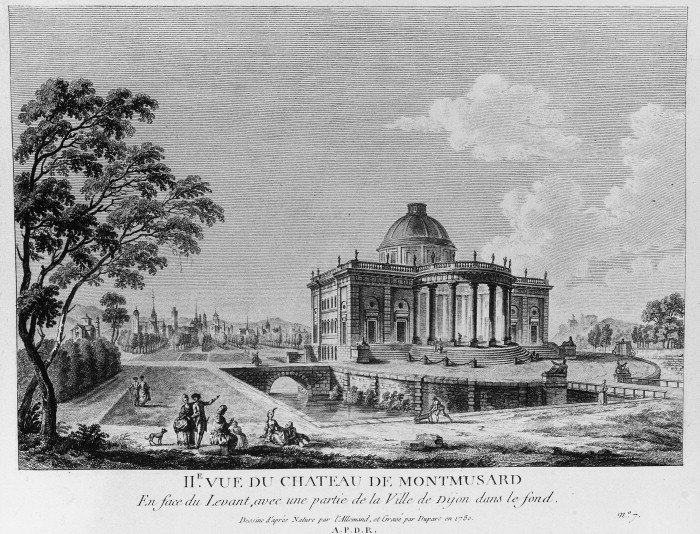
View of the Château de Montmusard. 1765 engraving by de Wailly.

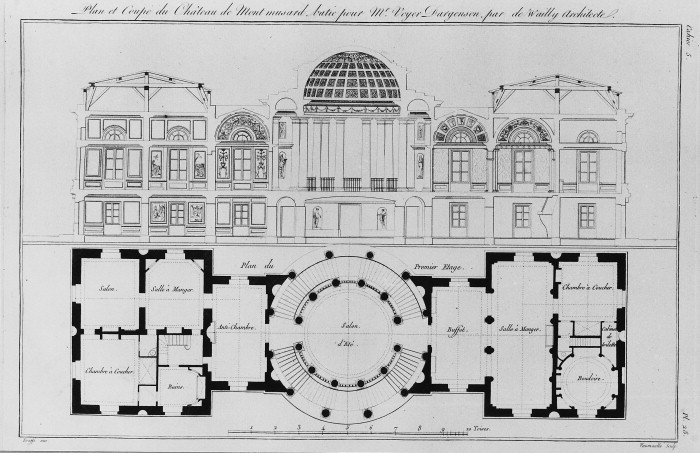
Chateau de Montmusard: section and plan

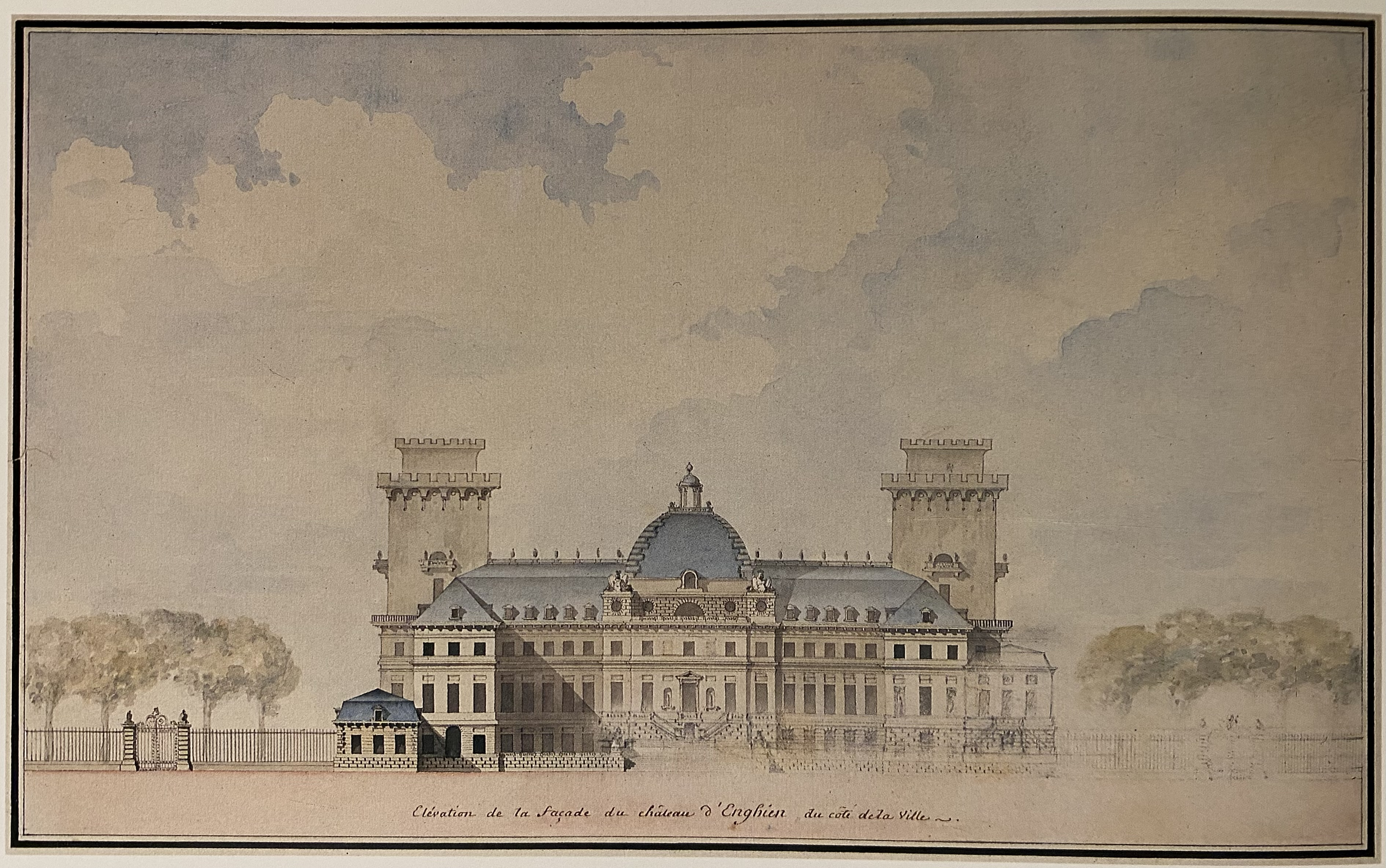
Design for a new château in Enghien, 1781 (not realized)

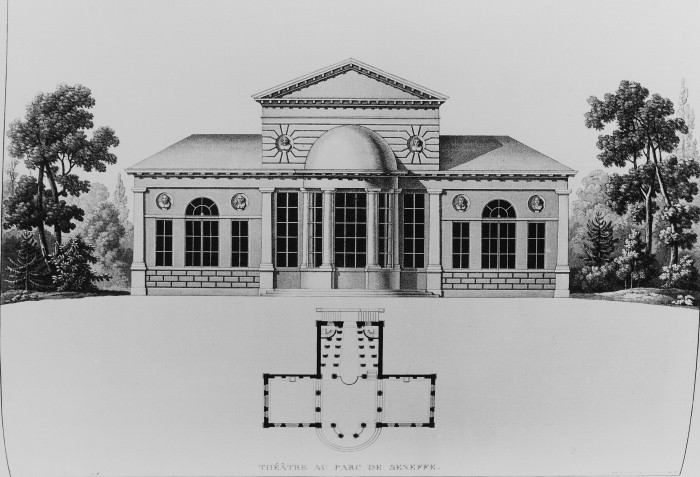
Theatre of the Château de Seneffe, 1779. Elevation and plan.

- Hôtel d'Argenson (also called the Hôtel de la chancellerie d'Orléans), near the Palais Royal in Paris (destroyed in 1923): interior installations carried out for the Comte d' Argenson (1762–1770).
- Transformation of the Château des Ormes in Les Ormes (Vienne) for the comte d'Argenson.
- Château de Montmusard near Dijon (Côte d'Or) (1765–1768): main architectural work of the Goût Grec in France, unfortunately mainly destroyed as of 1795.
- Maison 57 rue La Boétie in Paris, constructed by de Wailly for himself (1776).
- Maison 87 rue de la Pépinière, today rue La Boétie, for the sculptor Augustin Pajou.
- Decoration of the chapel of the Virgin in Saint-Sulpice (1774–1777).
- Temple des Arts at the Château de Menars (Loir-et-Cher) for the marquis de Marigny. De Wailly also provided and project for a Temple du Repos for the park at Ménars, which was not executed.
- Théâtre de l'Odéon (1779–1782) : From 1767, on commission from Marigny, Directeur des Bâtiments du Roi, Marie-Joseph Peyre and de Wailly designed the new theatre of the Comédie-Française. On 26 March 1770, an order in council authorized the execution of the project on the grounds of the garden of the hôtel of the prince de Condé, who expected to be rid of the property in expectations of setting up in the Palais-Bourbon. De Wailly was the protégé of Marigny and Peyre the architect of the Condé, a friend of de Wailly since their days as pensionnaires in Rome. The project, revised more than once, had to undergo the approval both of the architects from the royal department in charge of fêtes and other entertainments, the Menus Plaisirs, Denis-Claude Liégeon et Jean Damun, who were backed by the members of the Comédie and also by the City of Paris, represented by its architect, Pierre-Louis Moreau-Desproux. In the outcome, and thanks to the protection of Monsieur, brother of the King, the plans of Peyre and de Wailly finally won the day in the autumn of 1778. Works began in May 1779. Peyre would be principally responsible for the exterior and de Wailly for the interiors. On 16 February 1782, the troupe of the Comédie-Française were established in their own precincts. The theatre was inaugurated by Marie Antoinette, 9 April 1782.
- De Wailly gave an overall plan for the construction of the district around the new theatre, allotting a Cartesian plan. The buildings however were not carried out until a long time after the completion of the theatre, towards 1794.
- At the Église Saint-Leu-Saint-Gilles, Rue Saint-Denis in Paris: de Wailly created a choir for the Order of the Holy Sepulchre, and an underground crypt decorated in an original Doric order.
- Project for embellishment of the town of Paris (1789): this first plan for remanagement acts to foreground the overall refitting of the capital, with creating new passageways, reuniting the îles de la Cité and Saint-Louis, correction of the course of the Seine, etc.
- Plan of new Port-Vendres.
- Chapelle du Reposoir, Palace of Versailles.

=== Belgium ===
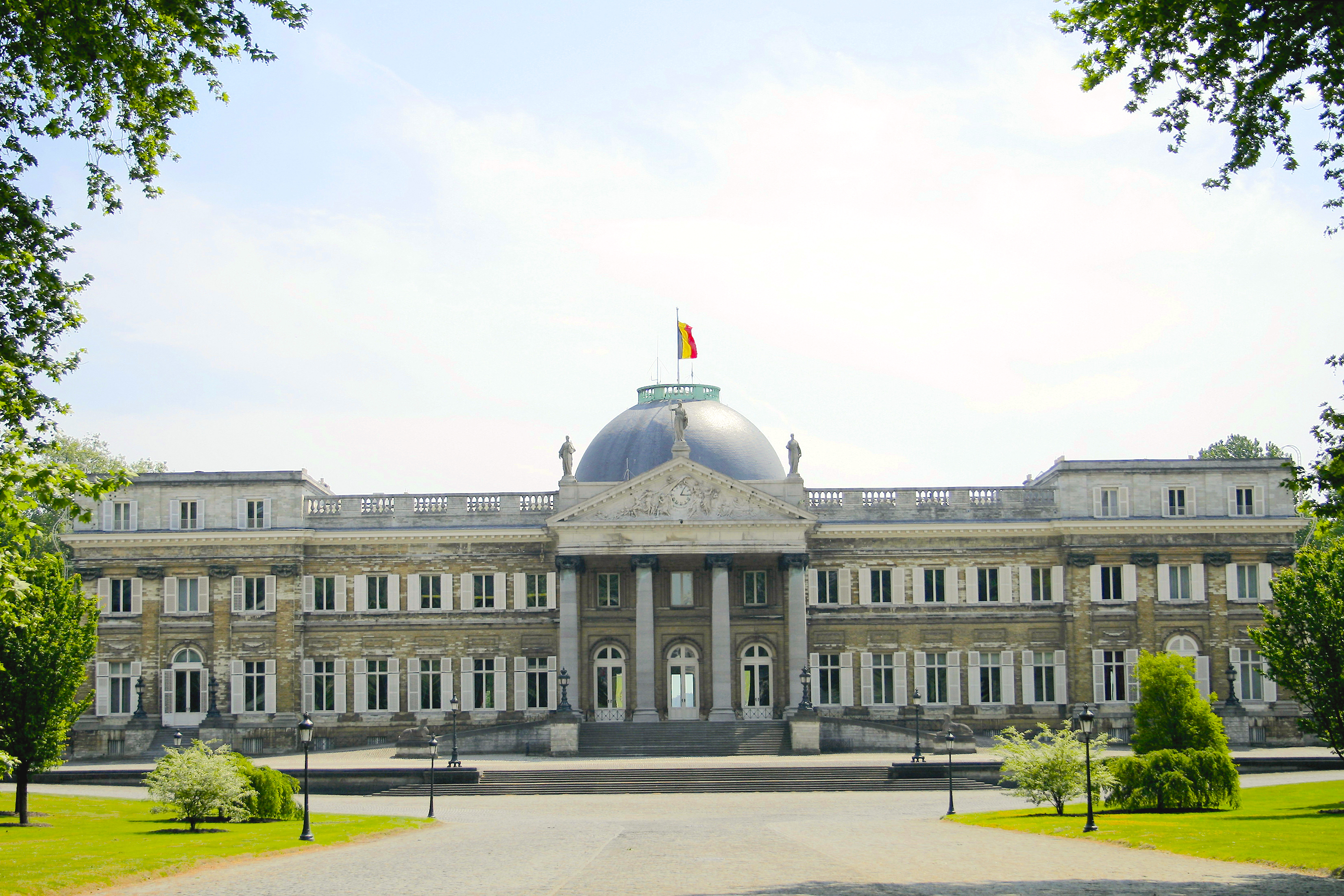
Royal Castle of Laeken.

- Design for a new château for the Arenberg family in the Enghien Gardens (1784 - not realized)
- Small theatre of the château de Seneffe à Seneffe (1779).
- Vaux-Hall (today: Cercle Royal Gaulois), Brussels (1782).
- Théâtre Royal du Parc, Brussels (1783).
- Renovation of La Monnaie, Brussels (1785).
- Château royal de Laeken.
- Castle Ter Rivierenhof, Deurne, Antwerp (1779).

=== Germany ===
- Reorganisation of Kassel city center.

=== Russia ===
- Palais Sheremetev in Kuskovo.
