= Marie-Joseph Peyre =

French architect (1730–1785)

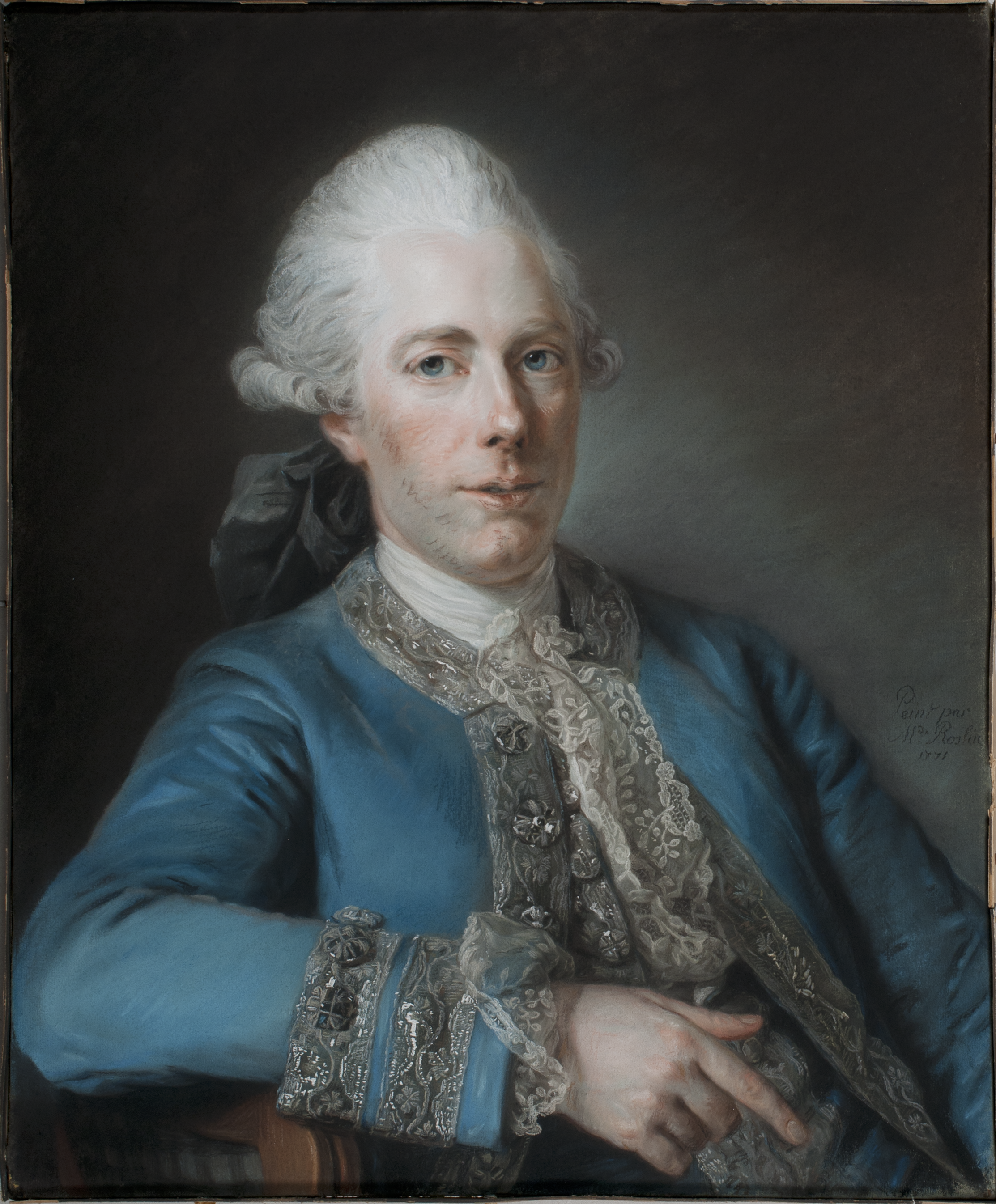
- Portrait by Marie-Suzanne Giroust, 1771
- Born: 1730; Paris, France
- Died: 30 August 1785 (aged 54–55); Choisy-le-Roi, France
- Other name: Peyre l'Ancien
- Education: l'École des Artes; French Academy in Rome
- Occupation: Architect
- Awards: Prix de Rome
- Practice: Neoclassicalism
- Buildings: Théâtre de l'Odéon

Marie-Joseph Peyre (French: [maʁi ʒozɛf pɛʁ]; 1730 – 11 August 1785) was a French architect who designed in the Neoclassical style.

== Biography ==
He began his training in Paris with Jacques-François Blondel at l'École des Arts, where he met Giovanni Niccolo Servandoni and formed a lifelong friendship with Charles De Wailly. He won the Prix de Rome for architecture in 1751 and was a pensionnaire at the French Academy in Rome from 1753, where he was soon joined by De Wailly, the following year's winner, who brought with him Pierre-Louis Moreau-Desproux, whose sister Peyre eventually married. Peyre stayed in Rome until early in 1756, during the years when the students at the Academy were creating temporary projects in the new Neoclassical manner.

In 1762 he built a villa for Mme Leprêtre de Neubourg in the southwest suburbs of Paris near the Gobelins; demolished in 1909, it is known only through the engravings in his Oeuvres d'architecture and two photographs taken in 1900 by Eugène Atget. It was an exercise in a purely Palladian manner, (Eriksen 1974:212, and pl. 48) quite unlike anything else done in France at that time.

In 1765 he produced a volume of Oeuvres d'Architecture de Marie-Joseph Peyre, which he dedicated, as "the fruit of my studies in Italy", to the marquis de Marigny, Pompadour's brother, who had been carefully trained for his opposition as Directeur des Bâtiments du Roi, and was attuned to the new classicism in the arts. Peyre interspersed his own work with carefully drawn views and sections of Roman monuments, such as a reconstruction of the tomb of Caecilia Metella, not as it was to be seen in Rome, but as it had originally been constructed. Peyre included grand designs for an academy and for a cathedral that was quickly identifiable as a "purified" neoclassical rendering of St. Peter's. Peyre's volume added to the repertory of architectural design that fed Neoclassicism. A mark of its continued usefulness was its reissue in 1795, after his death, with a Supplement, composé d'un Discours sur les monuments des anciens and its use by the English architect John Soane. Partly on the credibility the publication lent him, Peyre was named architect at Fontainebleau in 1772, jointly with his friend Charles De Wailly.

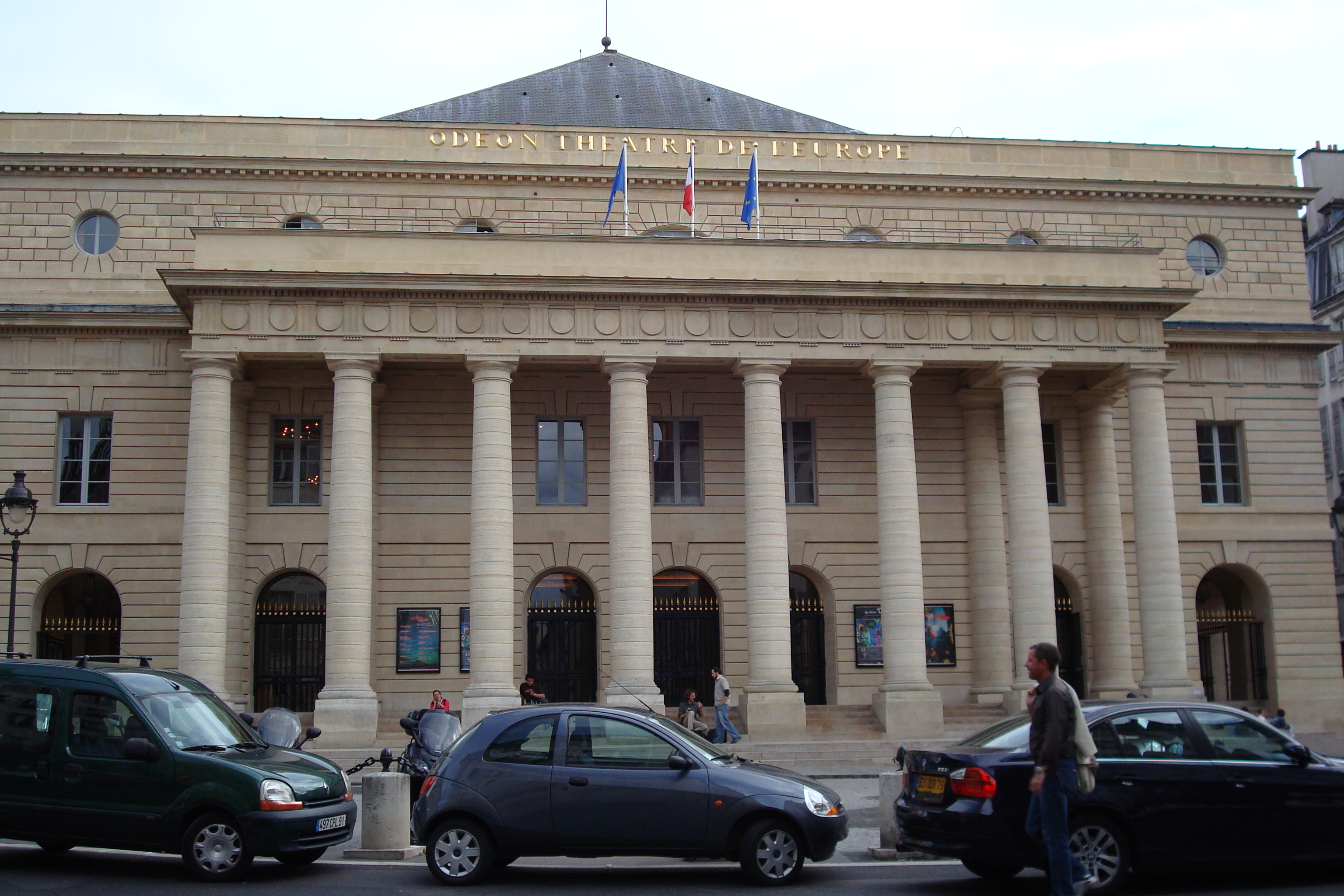
Théâtre de l'Odéon, Paris

From 1767 he worked with De Wailly on a project for the new Théâtre-Français, the present Théâtre de l'Odéon, Paris, which was at the heart of a complicated urbanistic scheme battered by many conflicting interests. De Wailly and Peyre were commissioned in 1767 to begin designs the project on the orders of Marigny, on the momentum gained by their joint success at the Opéra of Versailles. First designs were approved by the kind at the end of 1769, and revised designs the following spring; an arrêt in council, 26 March 1770, authorising the project's execution in the gardens of the former Hôtel de Condé. Further delays in acquiring additional land for the project, jointly financed by the King and the City of Paris, were partly occasioned by a long absence of Condé from 1771. De Wailly returned ti Italy and in his absence Marigny resigned; his successor, the abbé de Terray, championed a rival project urged by the City of Paris, that was the design, awkwardly enough, of Peyre's brother-in-law and De Wailly's friend from Roman days, Pierre-Louis Moreau-Desproux, now architect to the City of Paris. Thanks to the efforts of Monsieur, the Comte de Provence, brother of the king, the Peyre-De Wailly project was finally confirmed in 1778 with a slight modification to its planned orientation, to bring it into accord with the comte de Provence's residence, the Palais du Luxembourg. Work, on foundations already constructed by Moreau, began in May 1779, paid for by Monsieur, and by 16 February 1782, the players of the Comédie Française, who had objected to the project from the start, were installed in the new theatre, which was inaugurated by Marie-Antoinette, 9 April 1782, with a performance of Jean Racine's Iphigénie.

Peyre was the architect of the Hôtel de Nivernais, rue de Tournon, which was praised by his former master Blondel and the Hôtel de Luzy, rue Férou.

His portrait was painted by Marie-Suzanne Roslin, 1771. Among his pupils were Charles Percier, Pierre-François-Léonard Fontaine and Jules de Mérindol. Peyre's younger brother, Antoine-François Peyre (1739–1823), and his son Antoine-Marie Peyre (1770–1843) were also architects.
