= Pierre-Louis Moreau-Desproux =

Neoclassical French architect (1727–1793)

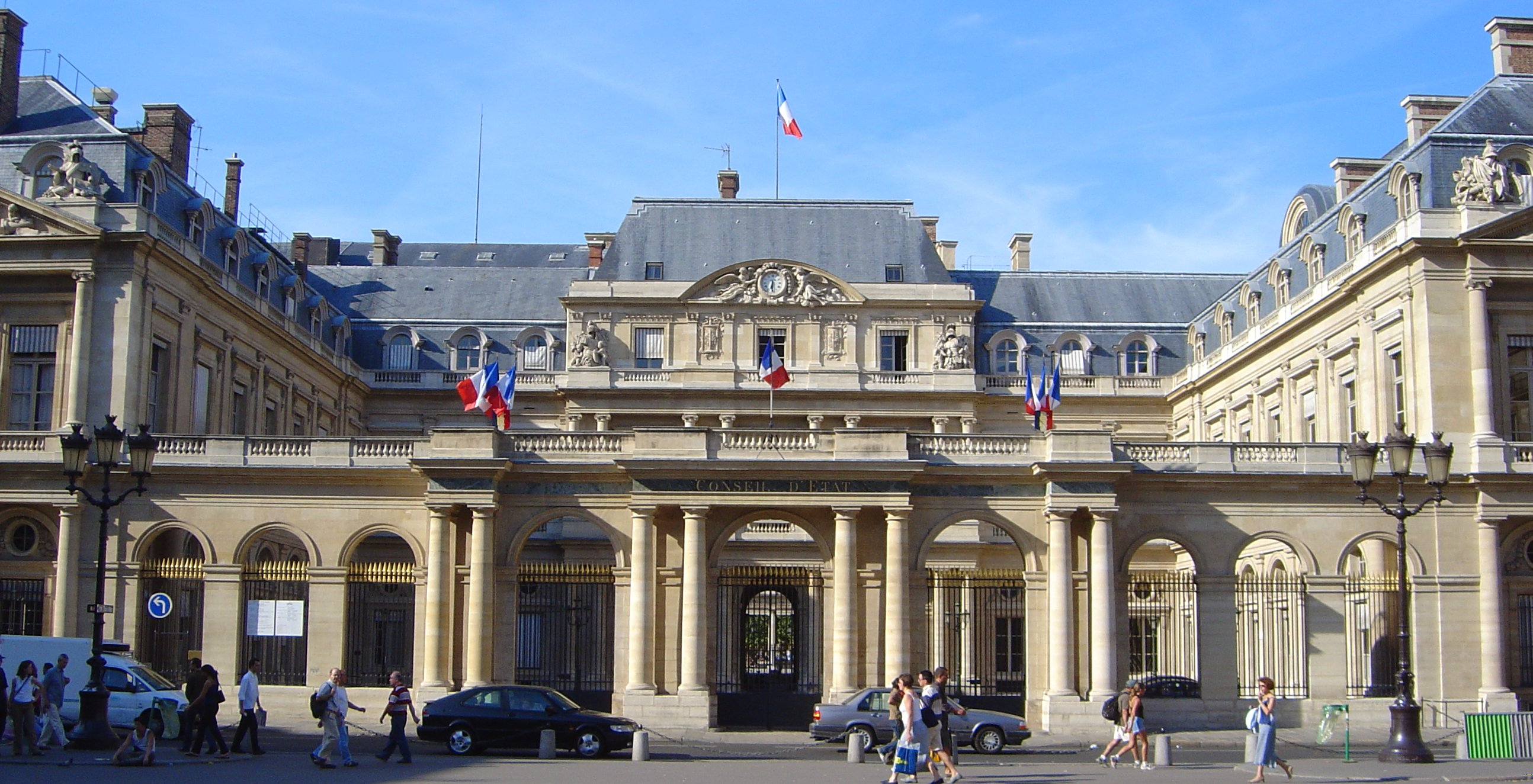
Moreau-Desproux's Neoclassical screen across the cour d'entrée of the Palais-Royal, Paris

Pierre-Louis Moreau-Desproux (French: [pjɛʁ lwi mɔʁo depʁu]; Paris 1727 — Paris 1793) was a pioneering French neoclassical architect.

== Training ==
Though he did not gain the Prix de Rome that was the dependable gateway to a prominent French career in architecture, his fellow-student Charles de Wailly invited him to share his prize. In Rome, from September 1754 to December 1756, half the customary three years, they were exposed to the ferment of the new neoclassical style and took part, with Marie-Joseph Peyre, in the archaeological excavations of the Baths of Diocletian; their speculative reconstructions of the complex attracted the attention of Piranesi.

== Career ==
On his return to Paris, Moreau-Desproux’s first commission was the fully neoclassical Hôtel de Chavannes near the Porte du Temple, at that time on the outskirts of the city; the house was completed by May 1758 and was demolished in 1846 (Eriksen); it earned a critical analysis from the Abbé Laugier, theoretician of neoclassicism, in his Observations sur l'architecture 1765. A colossal order of Ionic pilasters distinguished its façade, where the two floors were articulated by a plain banding of Greek key fret.

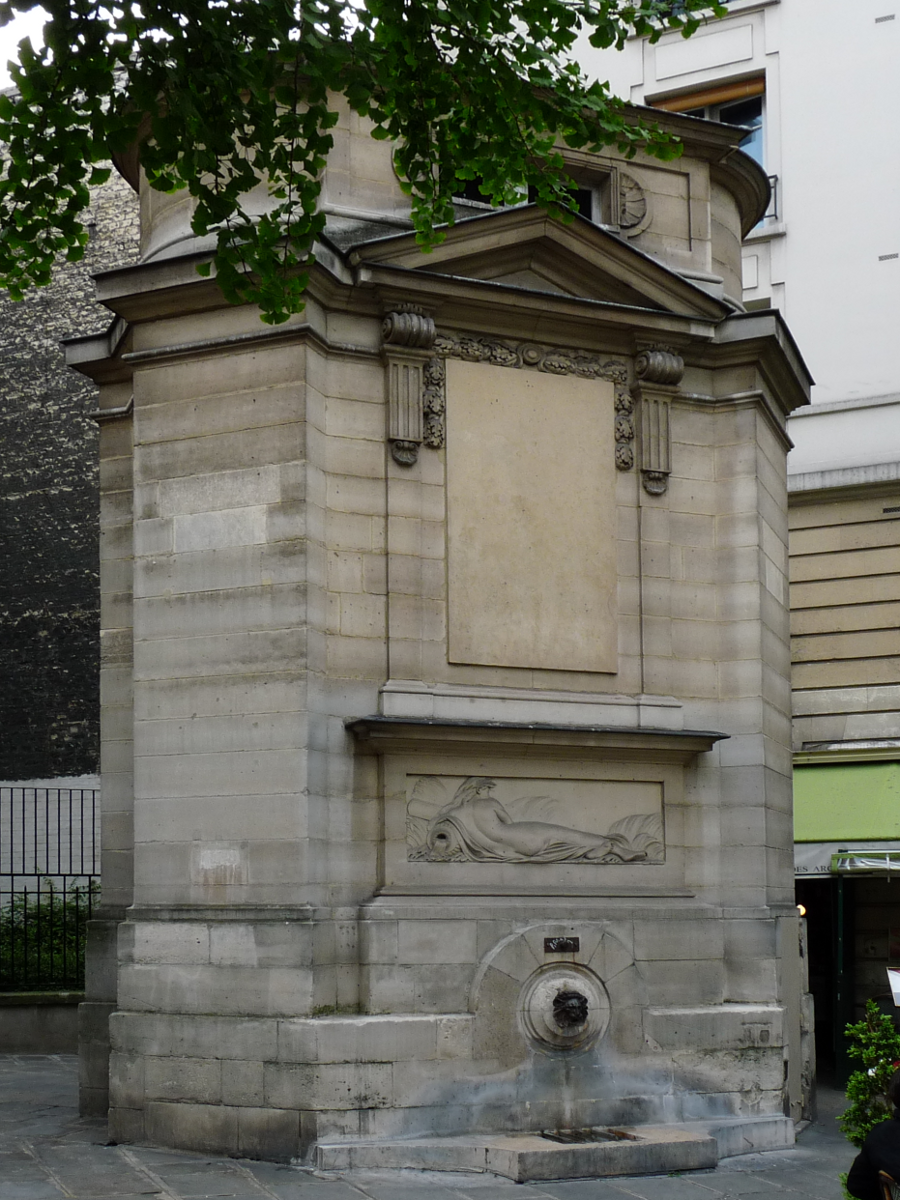
Fontaine des Haudriettes

Officially Moreau-Desproux was appointed architect-in-charge (maître des bâtiments) to the city of Paris in 1763 and held the appointment until 1783. His great-uncle Jean-Baptiste-Augustin Beausire had formerly held the position. His position enabled him to influence the appointment of Jean-François Chalgrin to a place in the city's office of works. Probably in 1763-64 Moreau-Desproux designed and built the severely neoclassical plinth-like free-standing Fontaine des Haudriettes at the juncture of the rue des Archives and the rue des Vieilles-Haudriettes, Paris IIIe. His official position required that he design and see constructed numerous temporary decorations erected for festive occasions: his designs for the masked ball given for the King and Queen, 23 January 1782, on the occasion of the birth of Monseigneur the Dauphin was engraved by Jean-Michel Moreau le Jeune.

Among his private commissions was the distinctly Neo-Palladian pavilion erected for M. Nicholas Carré de Baudouin on the heights of Ménilmontant (now in the rue de Menilmontant) in 1770. He also designed and built the Hôtel Gontaut in rue Louis-le-Grand, 1772 and was commissioned to remodel the Hôtel de Luynes (c. 1770-75, demolished in 1901 with the piercing of the Boulevard Raspail and the rue de Luynes) Behind Gabriel's facades on Place Louis XV, west of rue Royale, he constructed in 1772 two residences, one for himself, the other for his friend Rouillé de l'Estang.

From 1764 to 1770, after a fire, he rebuilt the theatre of the Palais-Royal on a site slightly further to the east, so that the cour d'entrée (now the "Cour de l'Horloge") of the Palais-Royal could be extended eastward to match the width of the garden court. A corresponding westward extension of the Place du Palais-Royal allowed the principal street entrance of the Palais-Royal for the first time to be centered on the square, as well as the corps de logis. For the auditorium of the theatre he used an oval plan and introduced structural iron. He also designed new façades for the Palais-Royal on the rue Saint-Honoré, work that was paid for by the city of Paris. The novel entrance screen incorporated arcades which recapitulated those of the opera house facade. Pierre Contant d'Ivry, who worked on the reconstruction of the Palais-Royal at the same time, designed a new facade for the corps de logis on the side facing the garden court, as well as interiors that included a grand staircase at its eastern end. Moreau-Desproux's theatre was destroyed by a fire on 8 June 1781, but the remainder of his work has survived mostly intact.

One of his sisters married the architect Marie-Joseph Peyre. Moreau-Desproux met his end under the guillotine during the Terror.

== Gallery ==
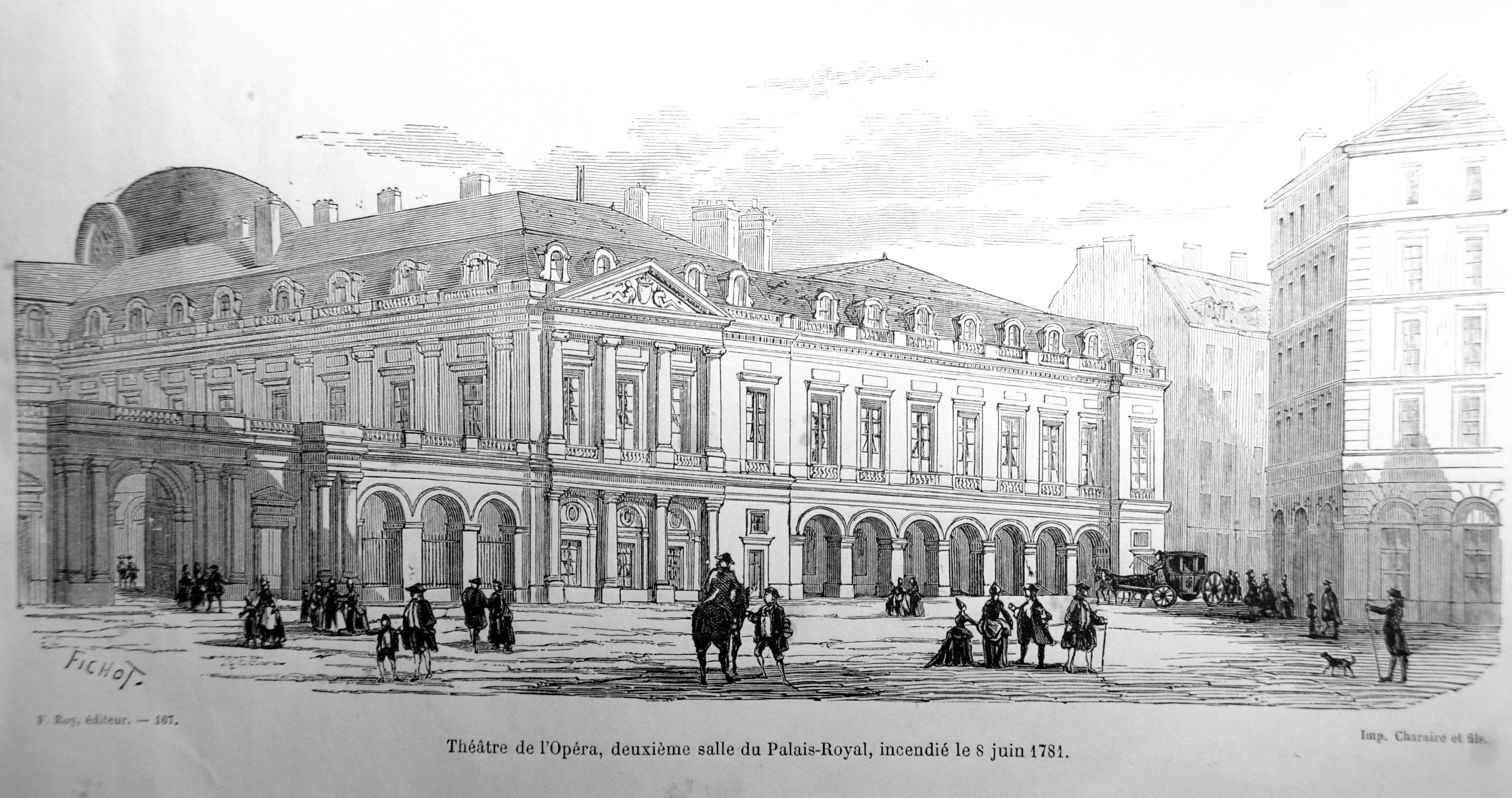
Facade of the Palais-Royal and Moreau's opera house

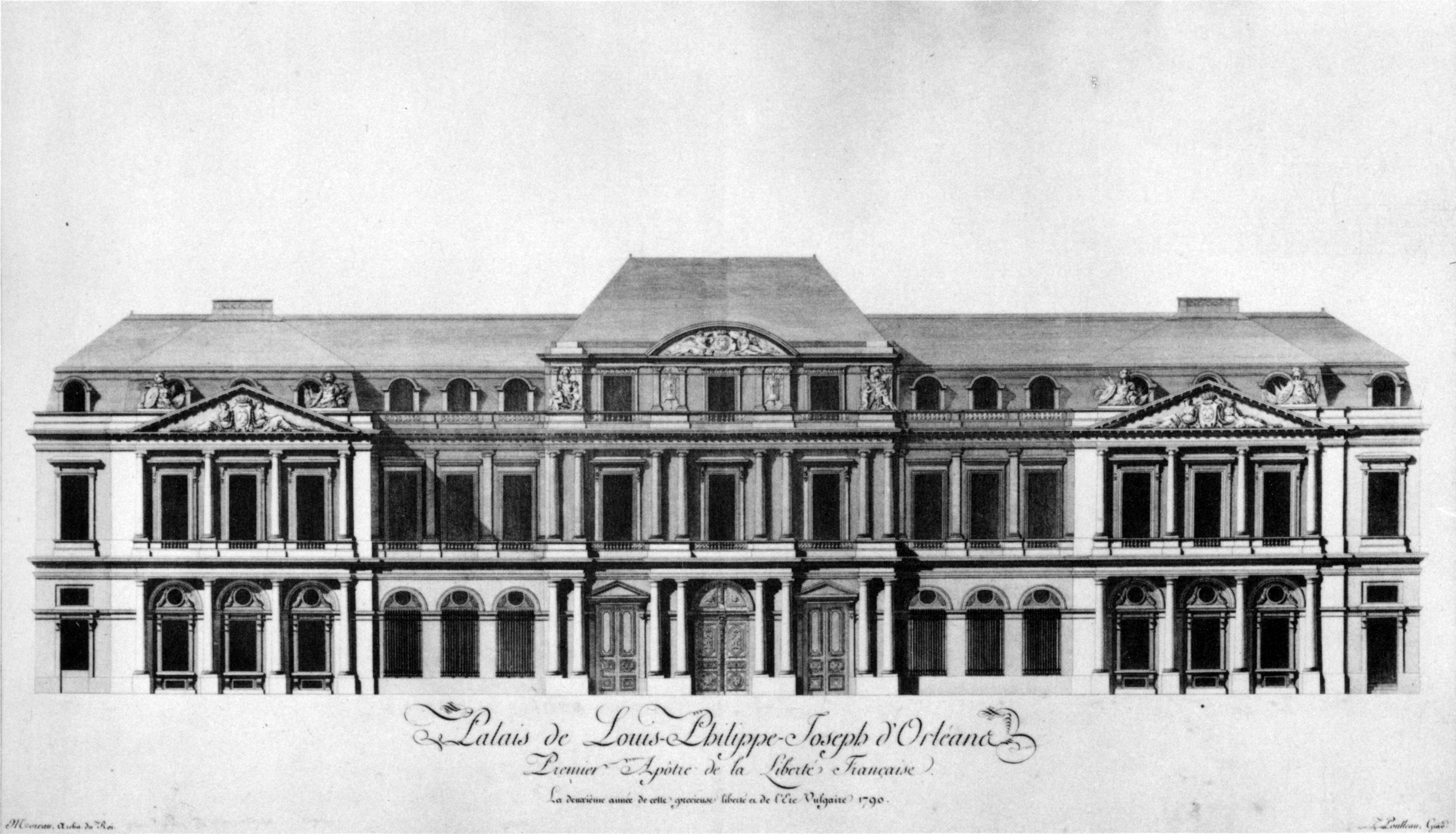
Elevation of the Palais-Royal on the rue Saint-Honoré, 1790

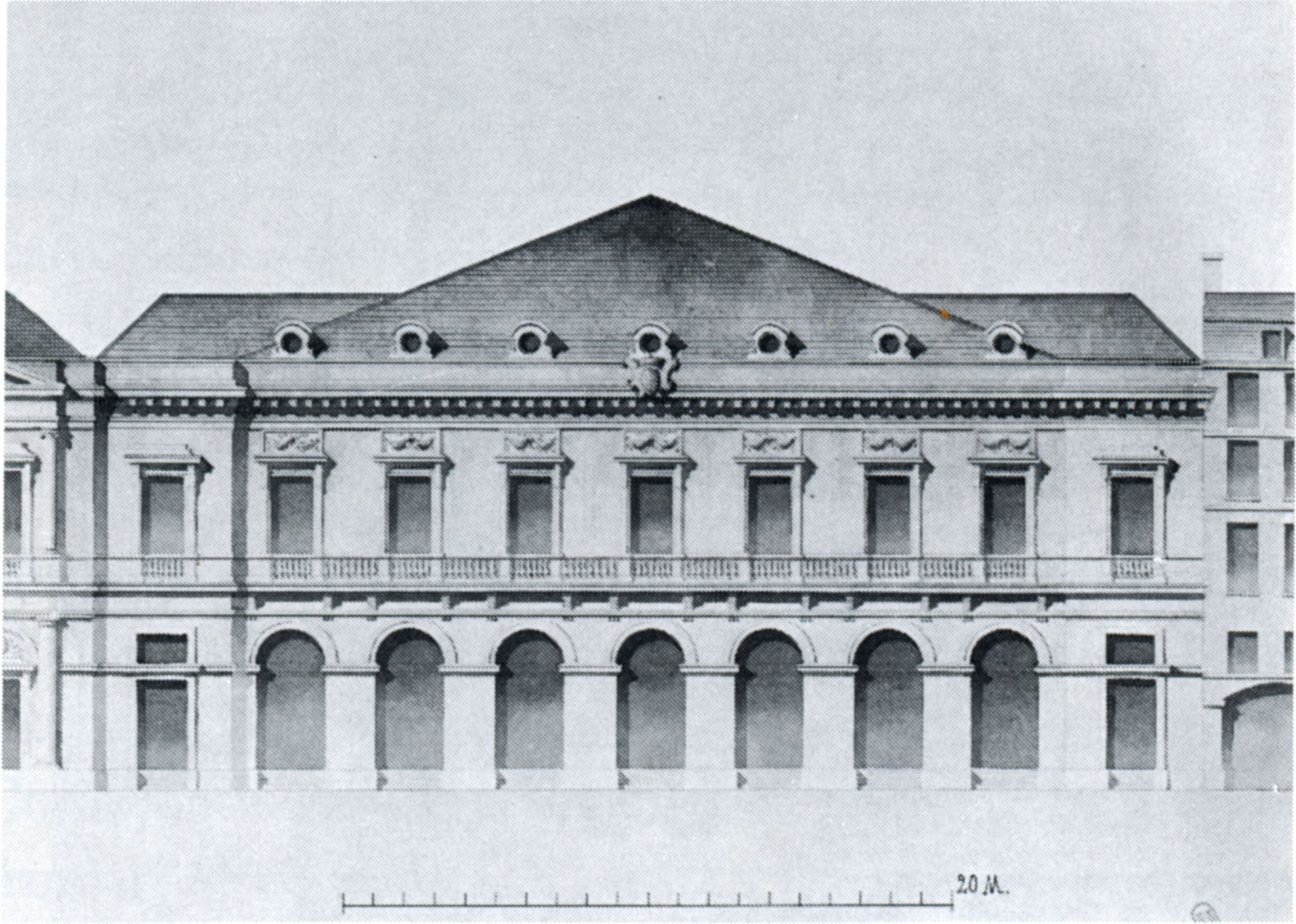
Elevation of the facade of Moreau's opera house
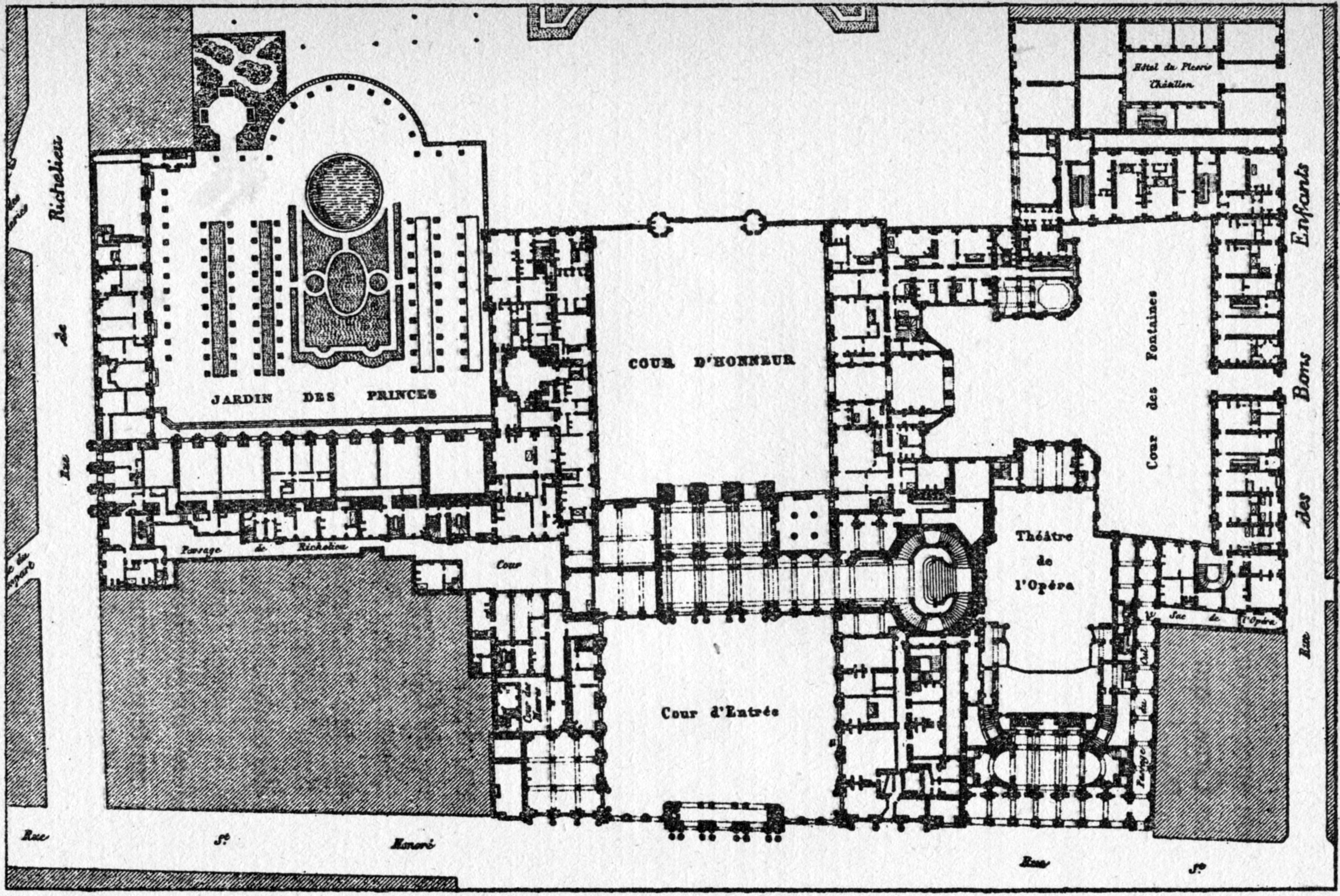
Plan of the Palais-Royal, 1780

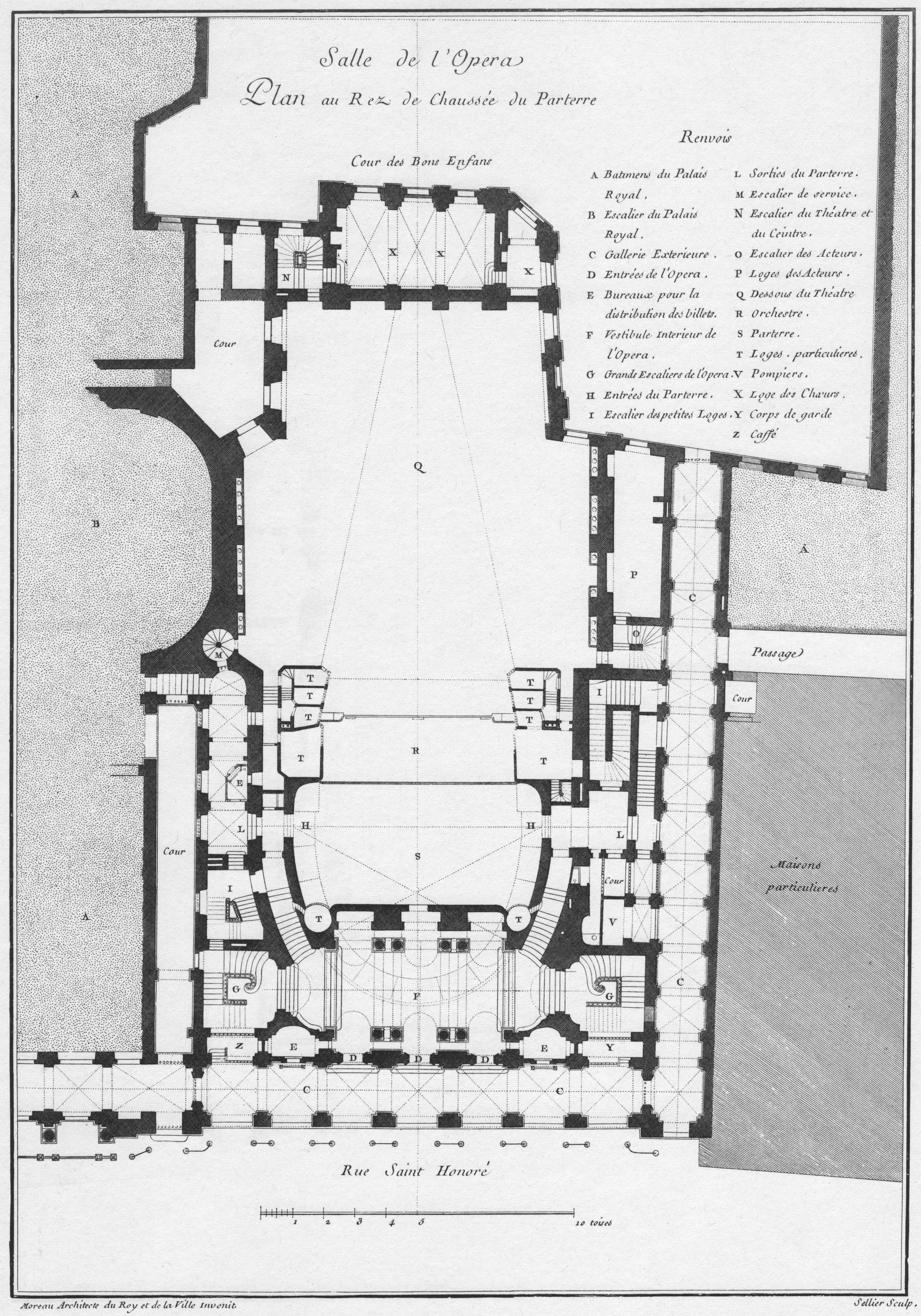
Ground floor

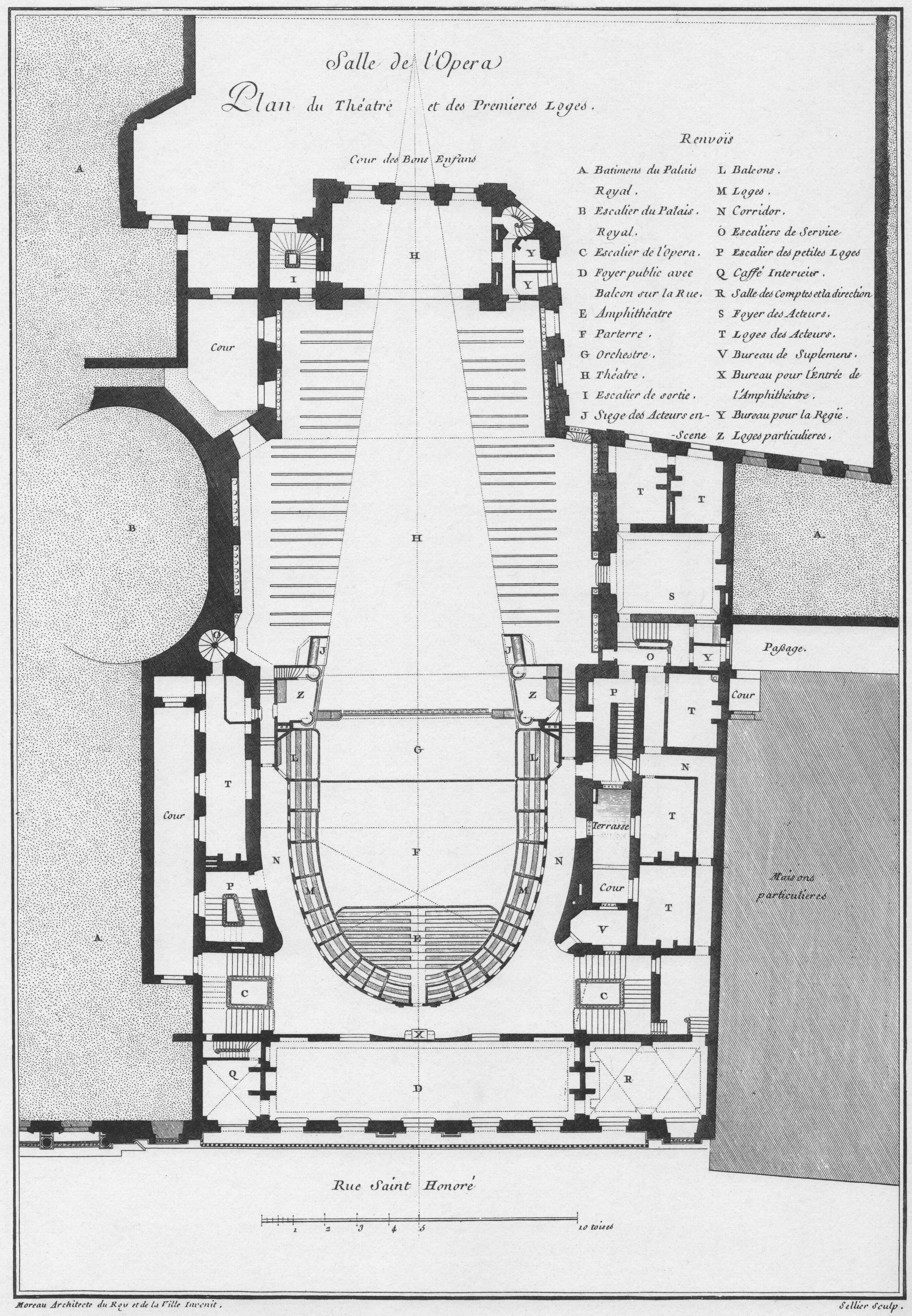
First loges

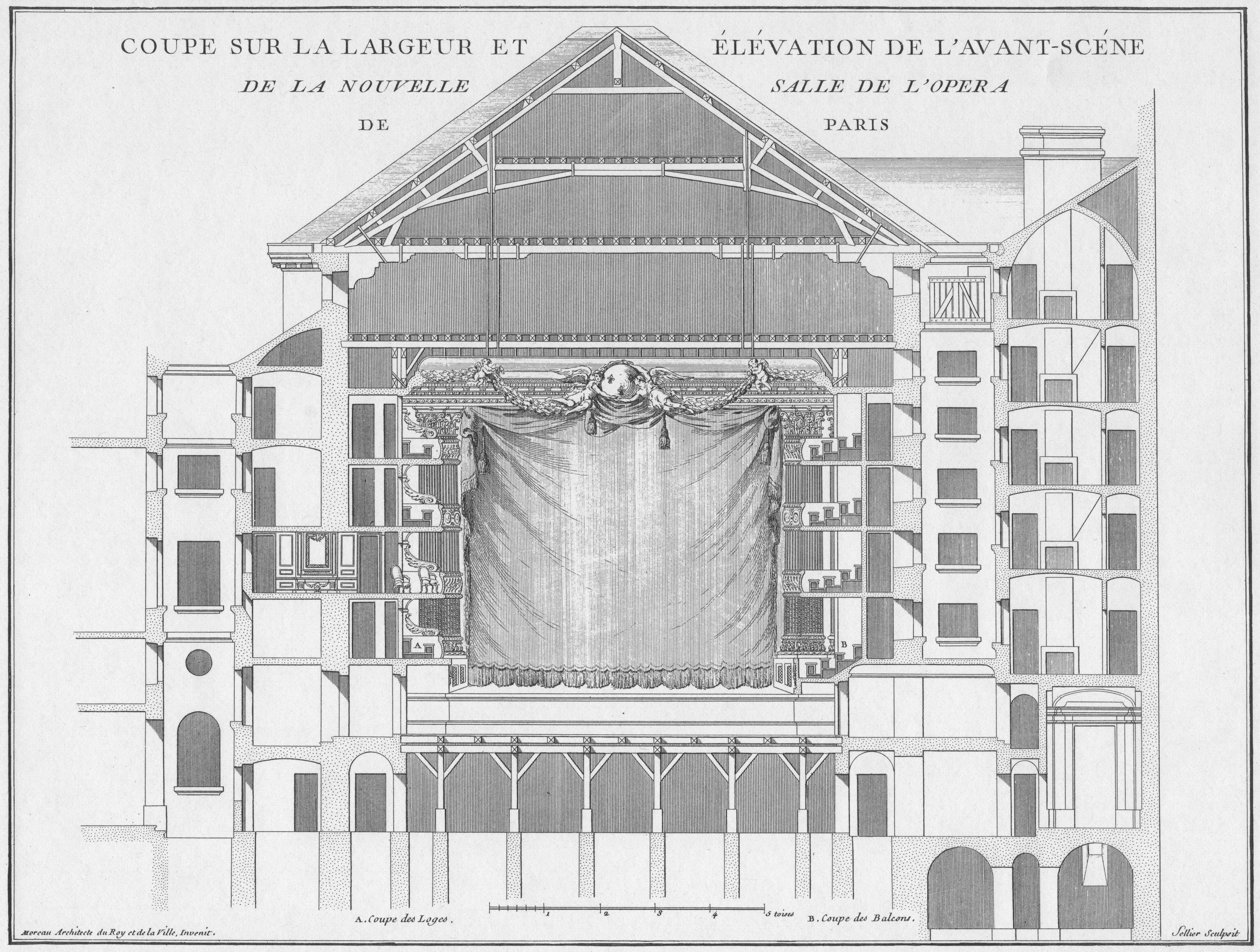
Transverse section
