= Goût grec =

18th-century French style of art and architecture

The French term goût grec ([ɡu ɡʁɛk]; "Greek taste") is often applied to the earliest expression of the Neoclassical style in France and refers specifically to the decorative arts and architecture of the mid-1750s to the late 1760s. The style was more fanciful than historically accurate, though the first archaeological surveys of Greece had begun to appear at this time. It was characterized by severe rectilinear and trabeated forms with a somewhat crude Greek detailing incorporating bold pilasters, Ionic scrolls, Greek key and scroll frets and guilloche.

The style's origin may be found in the suite of furniture designed by Louis-Joseph Le Lorrain for the Parisian financier Ange-Laurent de La Live de Jully (now in the Musée Condé, Chantilly). In comparison to the prevailing Rococo style, the austerity of these pieces is stark, and found praise from the contemporary authority on Greek antiquity, the Comte de Caylus. Also influential were the engravings of the architect Jean-François de Neufforge, the architecture of Charles De Wailly, and the designs of Philippe de La Guêpière. The goût grec was a style of avant-garde circles in upper-class Paris, but was ignored at the court at Versailles, where a more conservative, stiffened Louis XV style and modified "Transitional" style obtained.

The goût grec was short-lived and replaced quickly by the delicate, linear (or insipid, according to preference) goût étrusque and goût arabesque, neo-Etruscan and "arabesque" fashions with closer parallels in contemporary British Adam style of the 1770s and 80s.

== See also ==
- Neo-Grec
