= Neoclassical architecture in Belgium =

Historical Belgian style of architecture

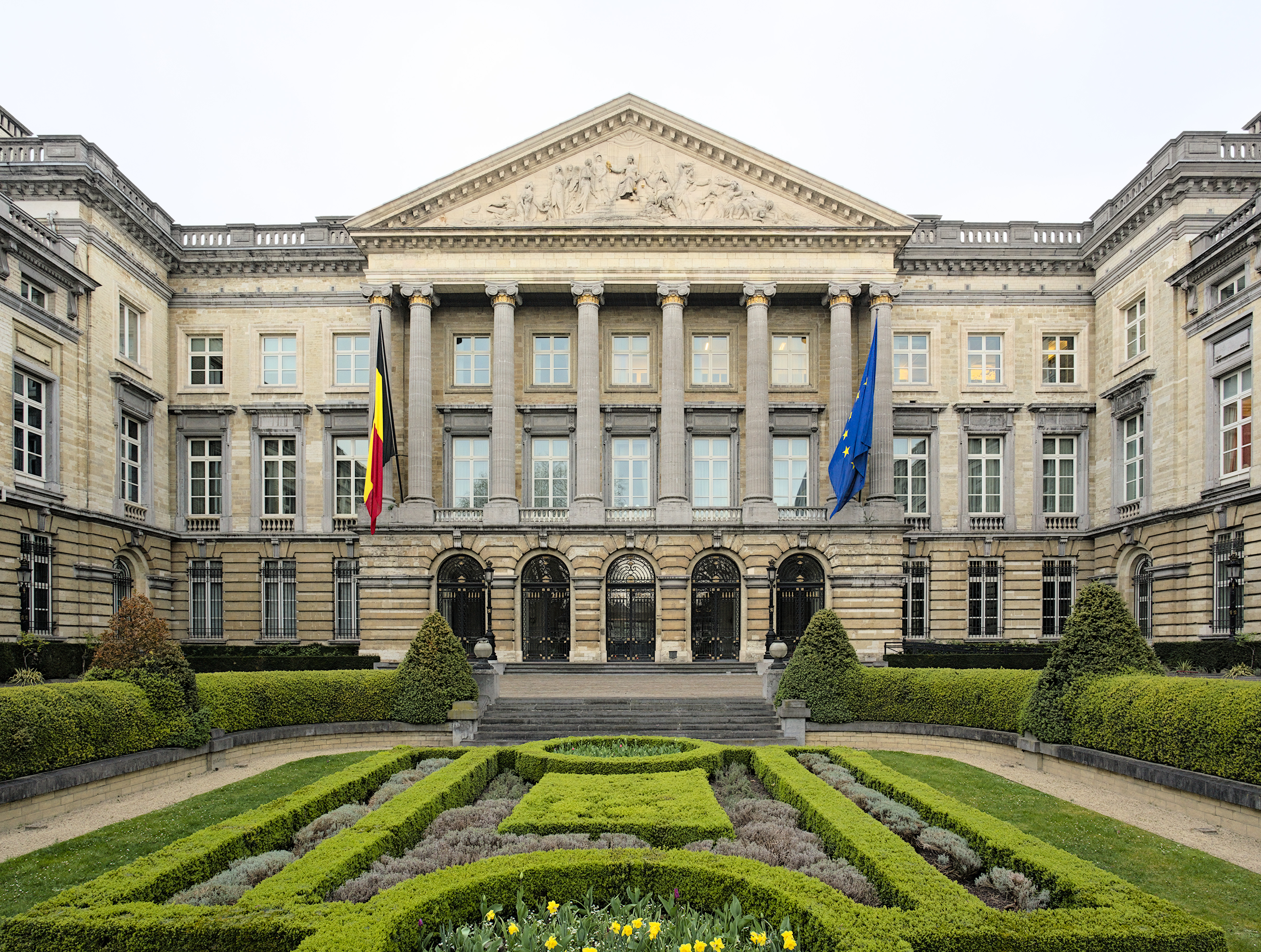
Palace of the Nation in Brussels, Gilles-Barnabé Guimard, 1778–83

Neoclassical architecture appeared in Belgium during the period of Austrian occupation in the mid-18th century and enjoyed considerable longevity in the country, surviving through periods of French and Dutch occupation, and the birth of independent Belgium, surviving well into the 20th century.

== Origins of neoclassical architecture ==
Neoclassicism in architecture was the result of renewed interest in the architectural forms of Greco-Roman antiquity discovered in the excavation of sites such as Pompeii and Herculaneum in the 18th century.

Its spread in Europe was driven by:

- the writings of Johann Joachim Winckelmann, who can be regarded as the founder of art history and archaeology as modern disciplines;
- the practice of the Grand Tour, a trip made by young men of the upper classes of European society, which had the effect of bringing together northern European high society together with ancient art;
- visits to Italy by many young artists and architects.

== Neoclassicism in the Austrian Netherlands ==
Growth of the neoclassical style in the Austrian Netherlands took place from 1759 during the reign of the Empress Maria Theresa of Austria and the governorship of her brother-in-law Charles Alexander of Lorraine.

The growth of the style was aided by various elements including:

- The architect Laurent-Benoît Dewez's stay in Italy from 1754 to 1757;
- The decision in 1774 by the Governor Charles Alexander of Lorraine to redevelop the site of the old palace of Coudenberg, destroyed by fire in 1731 and left in ruins for more forty years, and to entrust the construction area of the Place Royale/Koningsplein and Brussels Park to two French neoclassical architects, Jean-Benoît-Vincent Barré, who designed the Place Royale and the Church of St. James on Coudenberg, and Gilles-Barnabé Guimard.

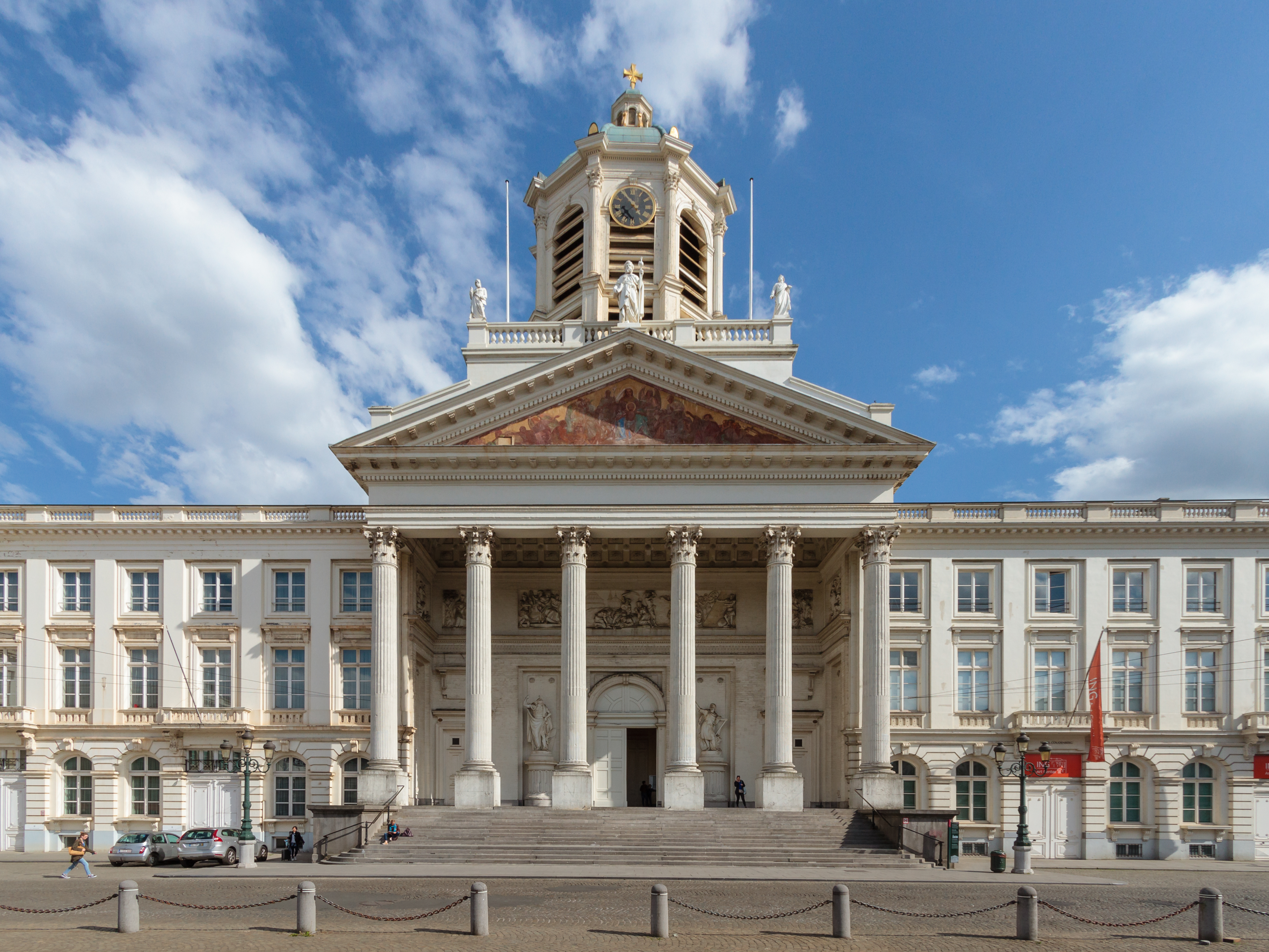
Church of St. James on Coudenberg, Brussels, Jean-Benoît-Vincent Barré and Gilles-Barnabé Guimard, 1776–87

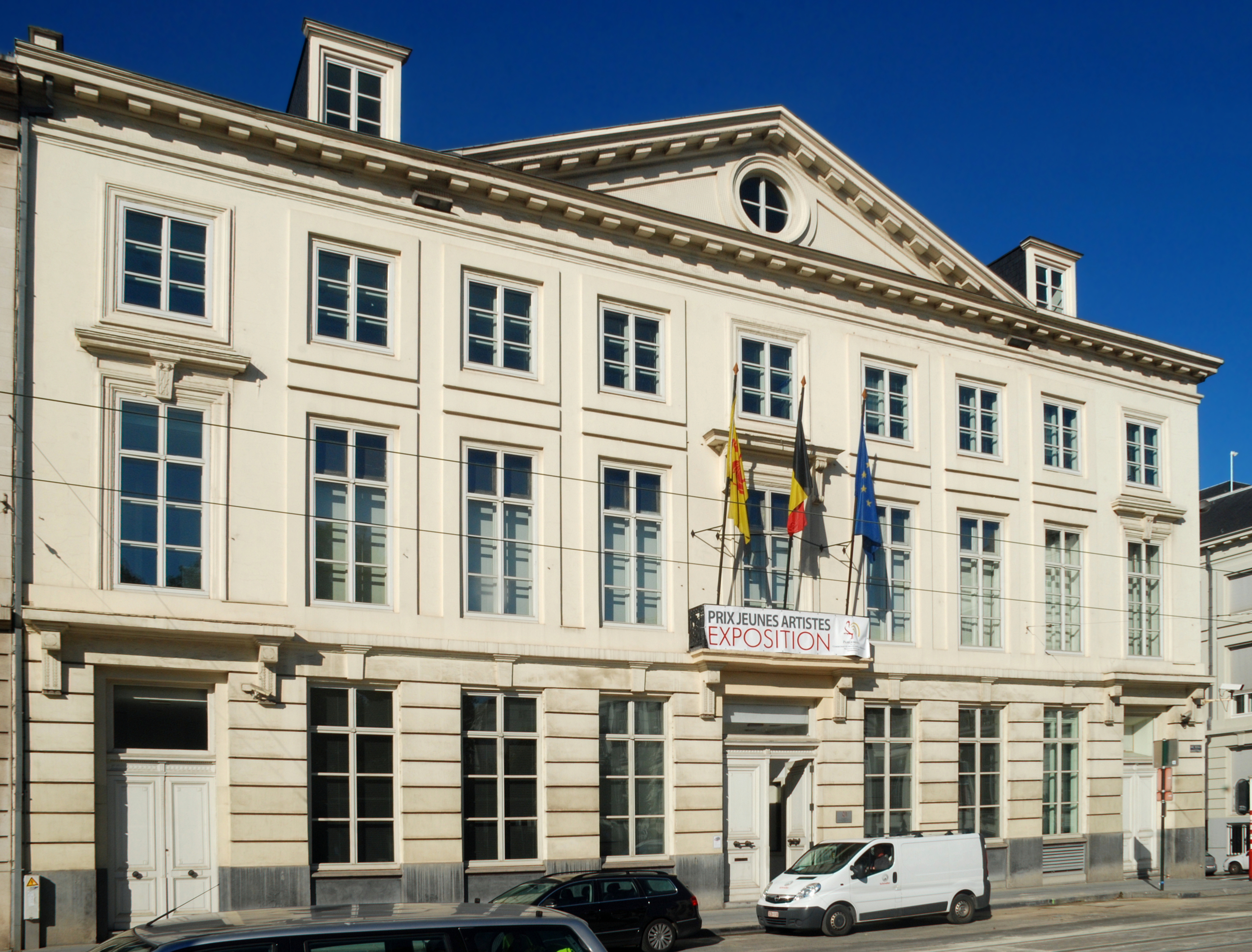
Hôtel de Ligne, Brussels, Gilles-Barnabé Guimard, 1777

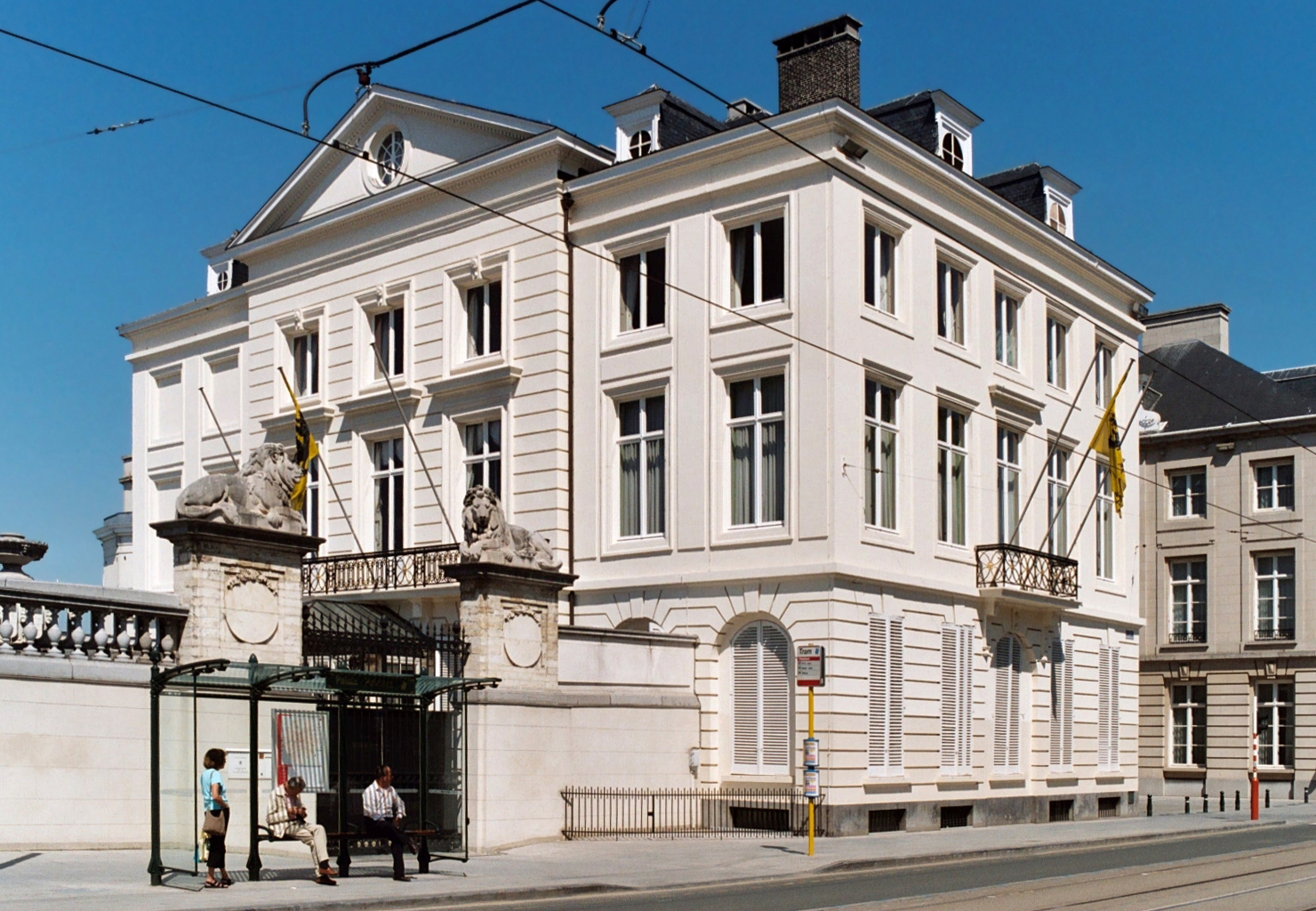
Hôtel Errera, Brussels, Gilles-Barnabé Guimard, 1779–82

=== Theresian style ===
The neoclassical style is known as the Louis XVI style in France; however, the parallel development of the style in the Austrian Netherlands is sometimes called "Theresian style" (French: Style thérésien) in reference to the Empress Maria Theresa of Austria.

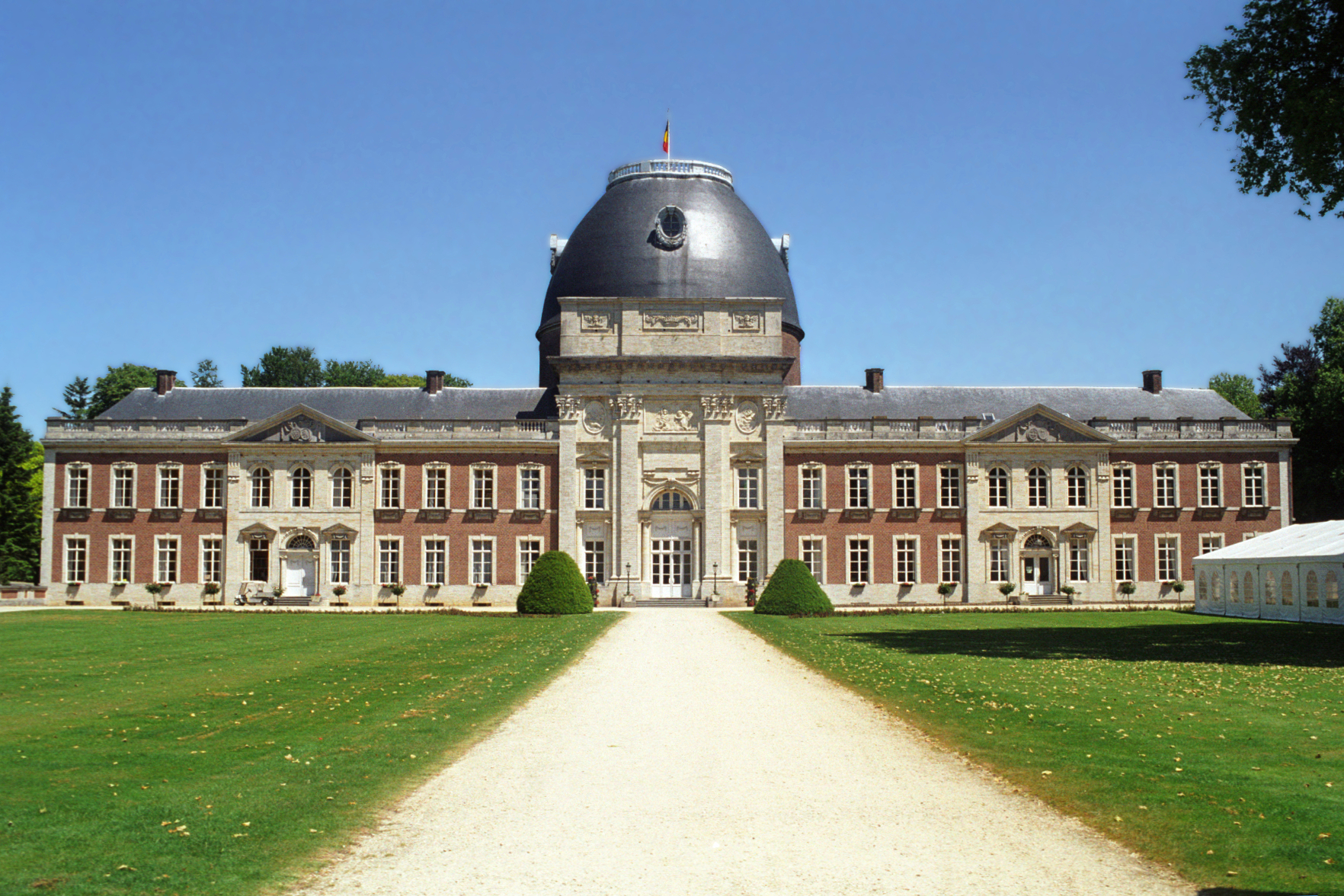
Opheylissem Castle, Hélécine, Laurent-Benoît Dewez, 1762–80

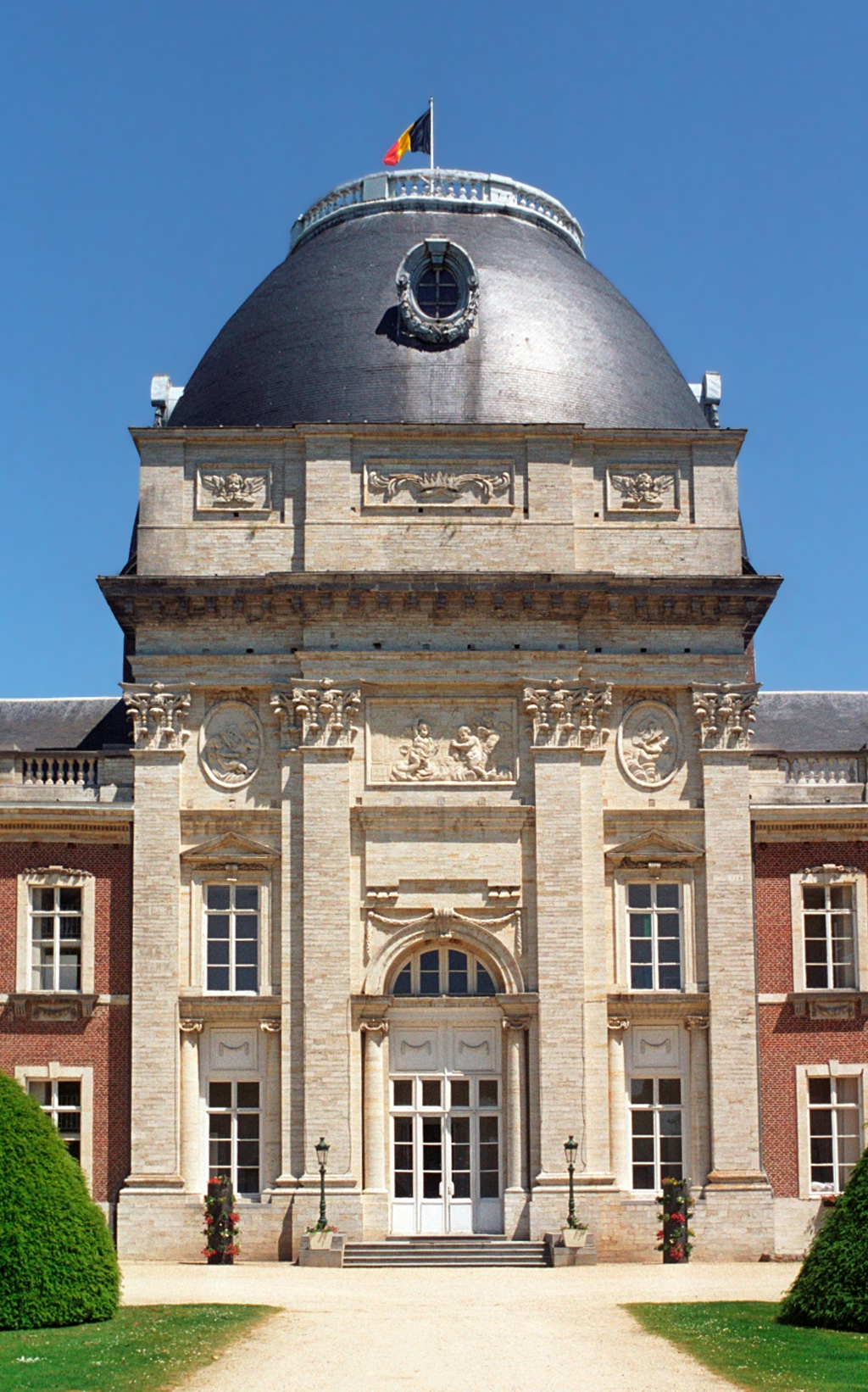
Opheylissem Castle, Hélécine, Laurent-Benoît Dewez, 1762–80

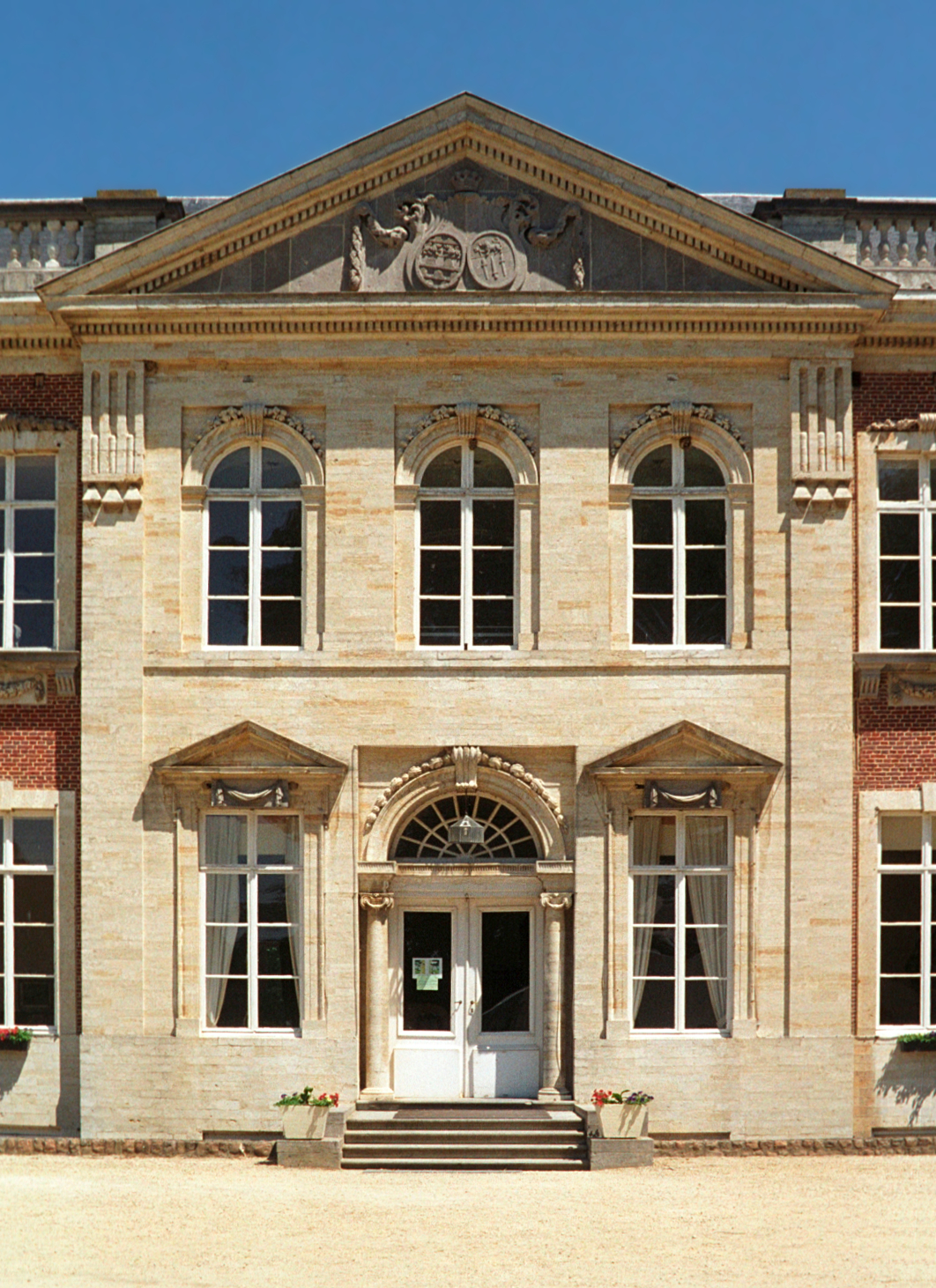
Opheylissem Castle, Hélécine, Laurent-Benoît Dewez, 1762–80

== Phases ==
It is possible to divide the architects and their major works according to the diverse phases of neoclassicism in Belgium and the distinct periods of political occupation.

=== Pure neoclassicism (1759–1865) ===
==== Austrian period (1759–92) ====
- 1759 Laurent-Benoît Dewez

Orval Abbey Church (1759–82, destroyed), Hélécine Abbey (1762–80), Gembloux Abbey (1762–79), Château de Seneffe (1763–68), Abbey of St. Martin of Tournai (1763), Forest Abbey (1764), Church of St. Begga of Andenne (1764–78), Valduc Abbey in Hamme-Mille (1765, destroyed), Bonne-Espérance Abbey in Estinnes (Vellereille-les-Brayeux) (1770–76), Floreffe Abbey interior (1770–75), Sint-Truiden Abbey (1770), Affligem Abbey (1770–79, destroyed), Church of St. Peter in Jette (1776), Vlierbeek Abbey (1776)

- 1760 Jean Faulte

Chapel of the Palace of Charles of Lorraine (known as the "Royal Chapel") in Brussels (1760), Sections of the Palace of Charles of Lorraine (1760)

- 1766 Jacques-Barthélemy Renoz (Note: The reconstruction of the Collège Saint-Jean-en-isle of Liège, after 1754, was the work of the Italian architect Gaetano Matteo Pisoni, although Renoz is responsible for the implementation, the production is not neoclassical Pisoni but rather the result of a mixture of Baroque and classicism is can not be traced back to the start of production by Renoz in 1754.)

Church of the Holy Sacrament in Liège (1766), Waux-hall of Spa (1769–71), Hasselbrouck Castle in Gingelom (Jeuk) (1770), Verviers Town Hall (1775–80), Beaumont Château (1775–76)

- 1774 Claude Fisco

Place des Martyrs/Martelaarsplein (1774), Nouveau Marché au Grain in Brussels (1787, with Nivoy)

- 1775 Jean-François Wincqz

Church of Cambron Abbey (1775–80), Church of Grand-Leez in Gembloux (1776), Church of St. Peter of Uccle (1782), Church of Neufchâteau-lez-Visé (1789)

- 1776 Jean-Benoît Vincent Barré (French architect)

Plans of the Church of St. James on Coudenberg and the Place Royale in Brussels (1776)

- 1776 Gilles-Barnabé Guimard (French architect)

Facade of the Church of St. James on Coudenberg (1776–87), former Hôtel Bellevue, now the BELvue Museum (1776), Place Royale (1776–81), Hôtel de Ligne (1777), Palace of the Nation (now the Belgian Federal Parliament) (1778–83), Hotel Errera (1779–82), all in Brussels

- 1779 Charles De Wailly (French architect)

Little theatre of the Château de Seneffe (1779), Royal Palace of Laeken (1782–84), Hunting Lodge Castle d'Ursel (pavilion called "Notelaer") in Hingene (1791–94)

- 1782 Louis Montoyer

Royal Park Theatre in Brussels (1782), Château de Seneffe (1782), supervision of construction of the Royal Palace of Laeken (on plans by Charles de Wailly), former refuge of the Abbey of St. Gertrude of Leuven (1782–84), former Hôtel Walckiers, at 12, rue de la Loi/Wetstraat, in Brussels (1782–84, current Hôtel des Finance), Hôtel Bender, Belgiojoso and Walckiers (1783–86, parts of the Royal Palace of Brussels), choir, nave and transept of the Church of St. James on Coudenberg (1785–86)

- 1786 Ghislain-Joseph Henry

Château de Duras Sint-Truiden (1786–89)

- Anonymous

Porch of St. Margaret's Church of Tournai (1779–82)

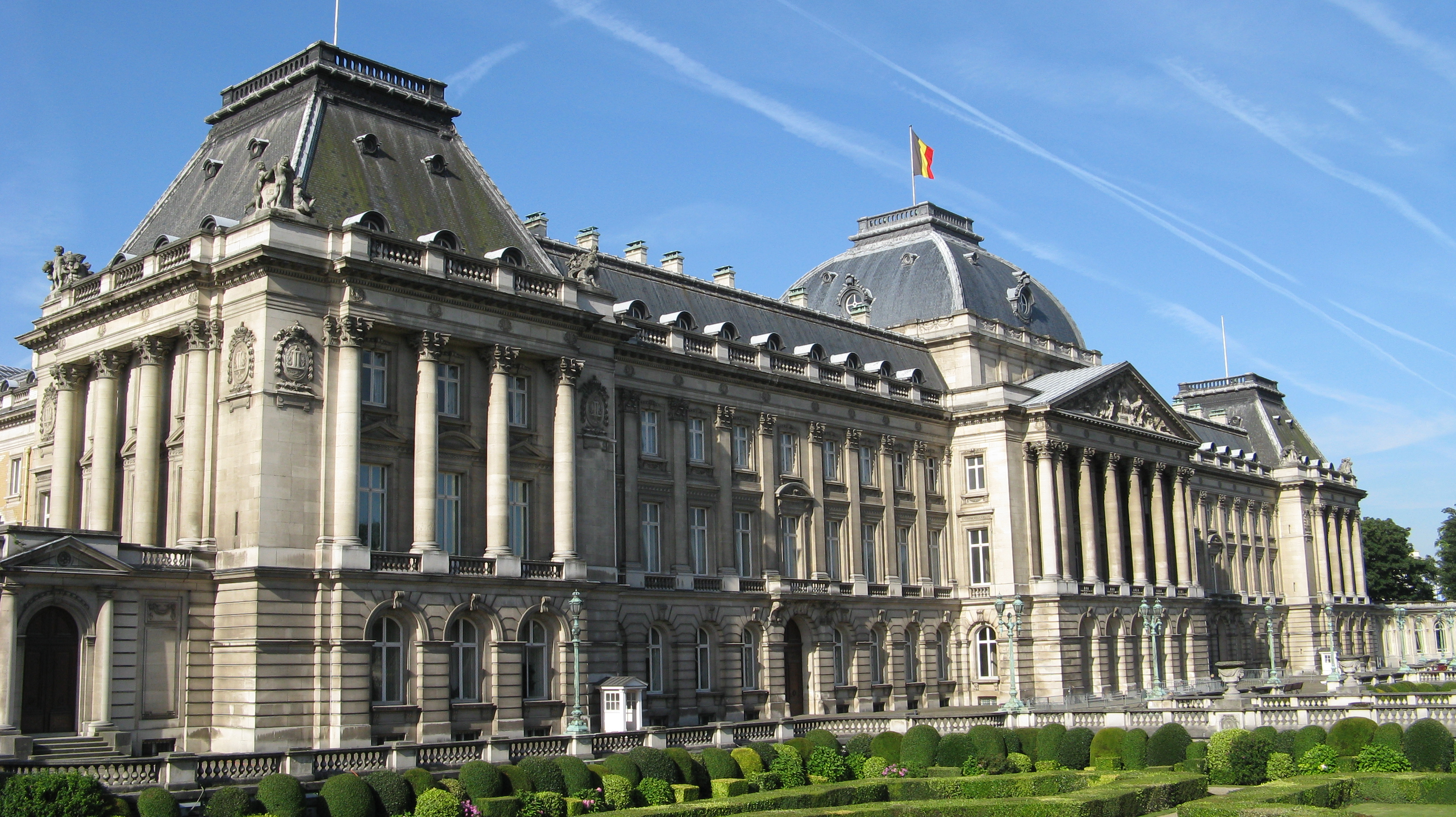
Royal Palace of Brussels, 1818–1934

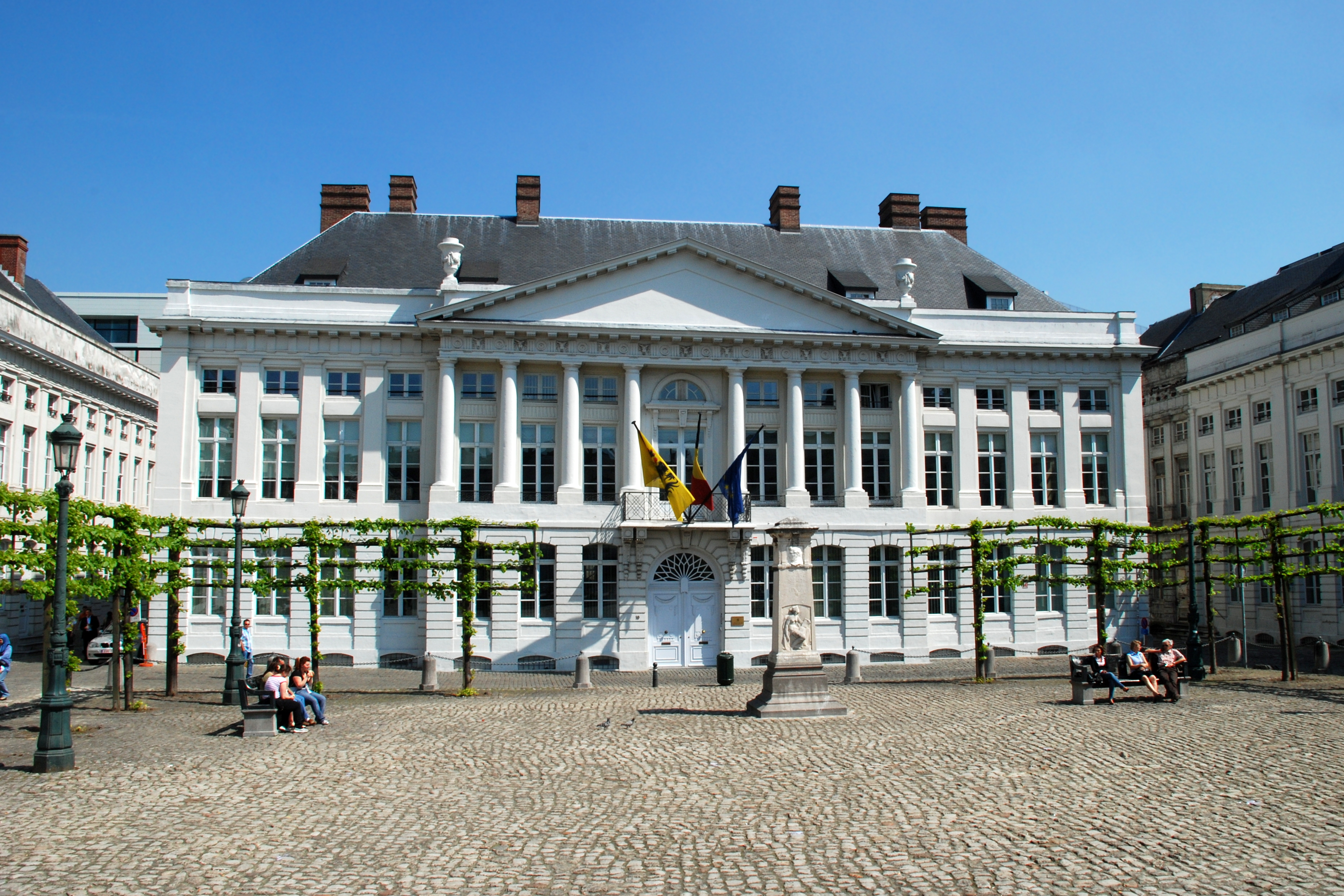
Place des Martyrs, Brussels, Claude Fisco, 1774

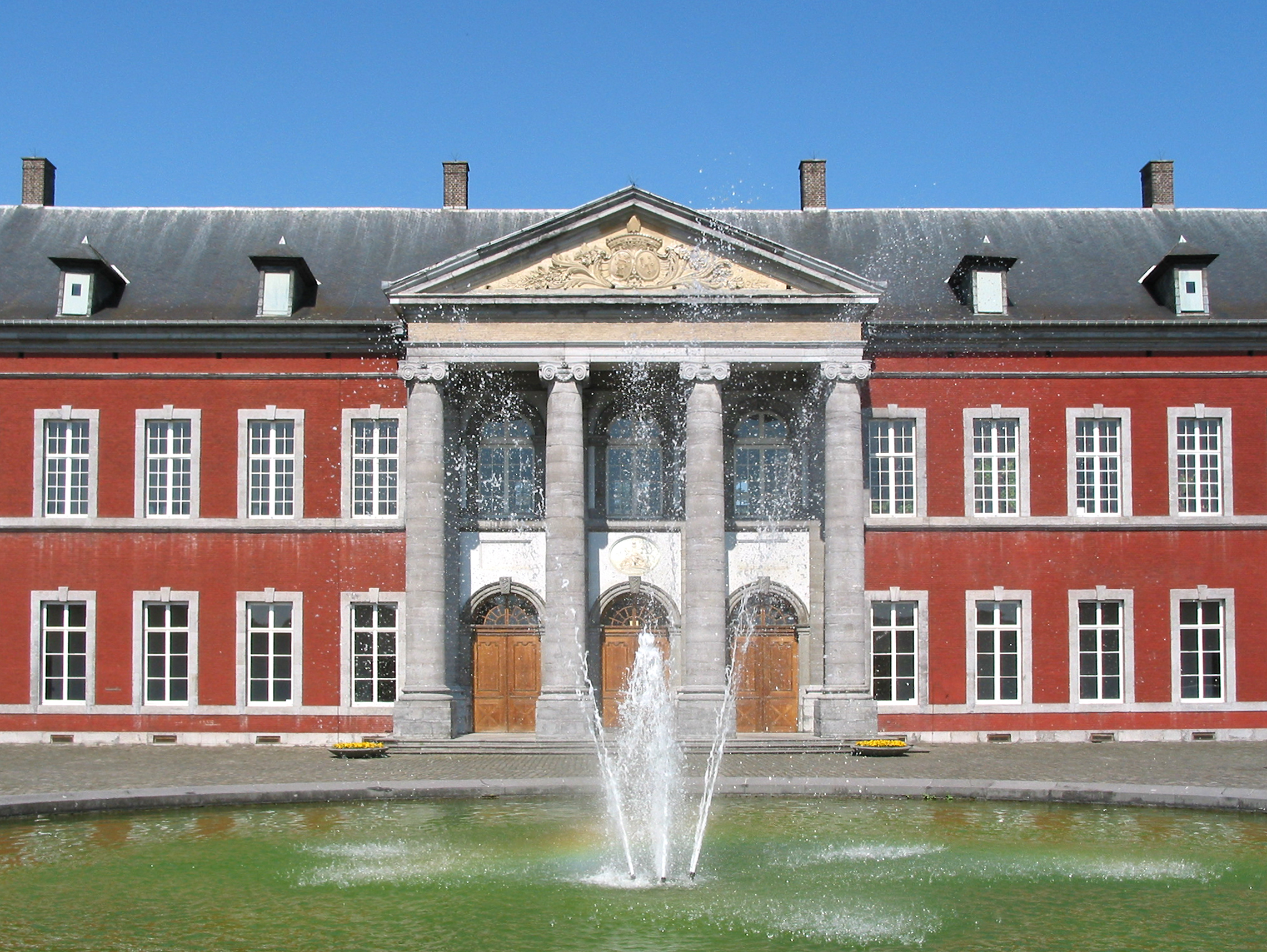
Gembloux Abbey, Gembloux, Laurent-Benoît Dewez, 1762–79

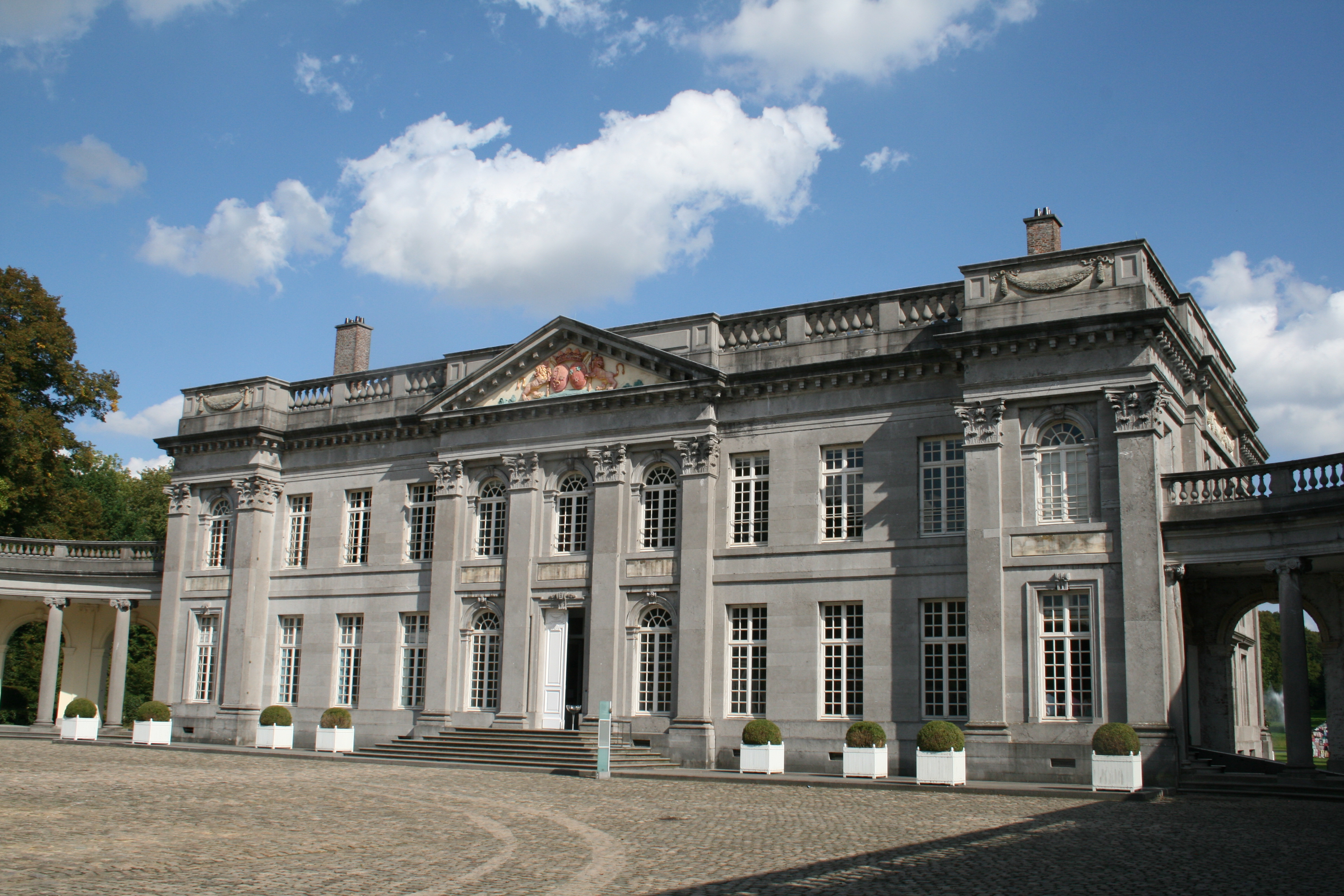
Château de Seneffe, Seneffe, Laurent-Benoît Dewez, 1763–68

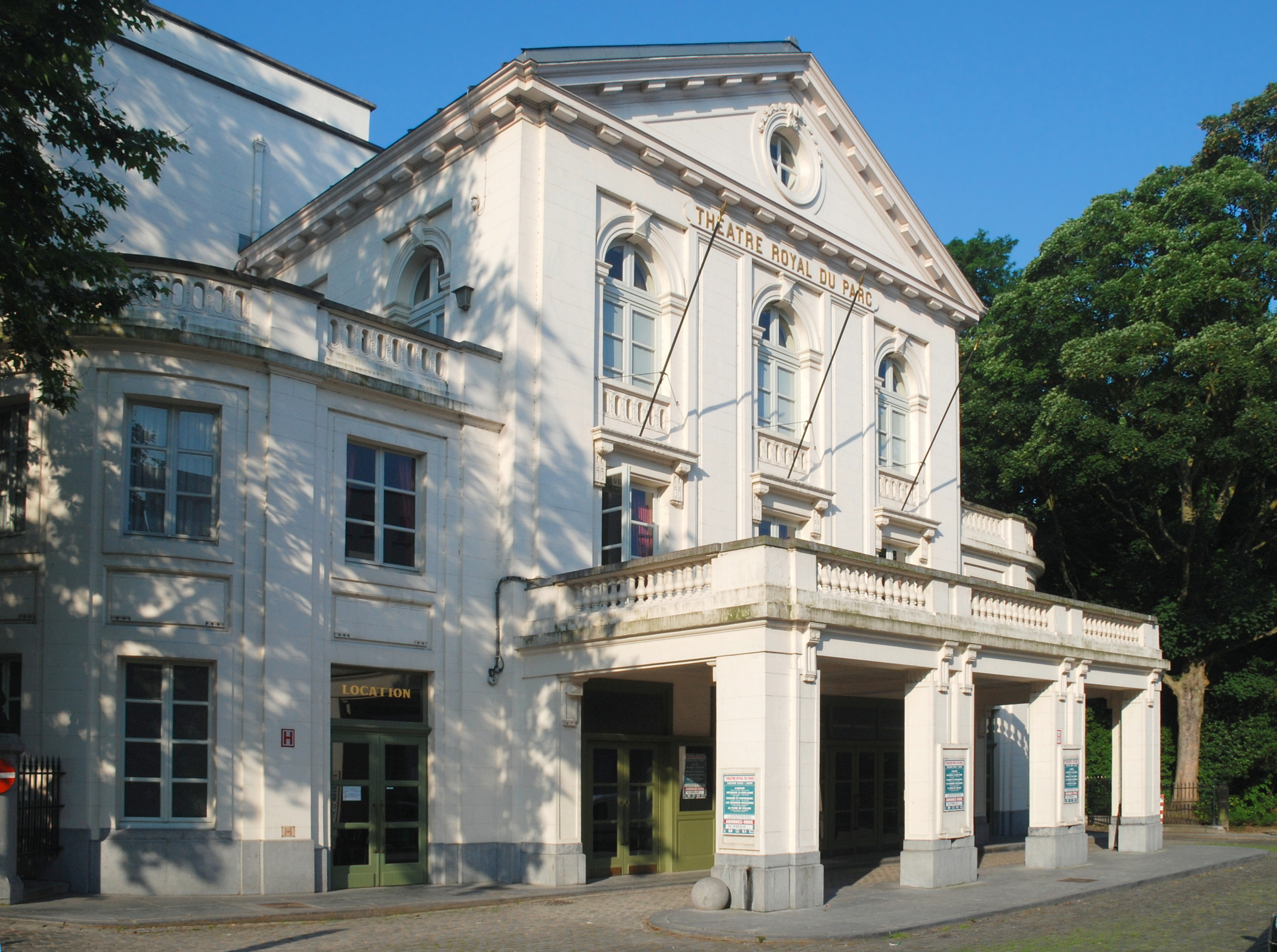
Royal Park Theatre, Brussels, Louis Montoyer, 1782

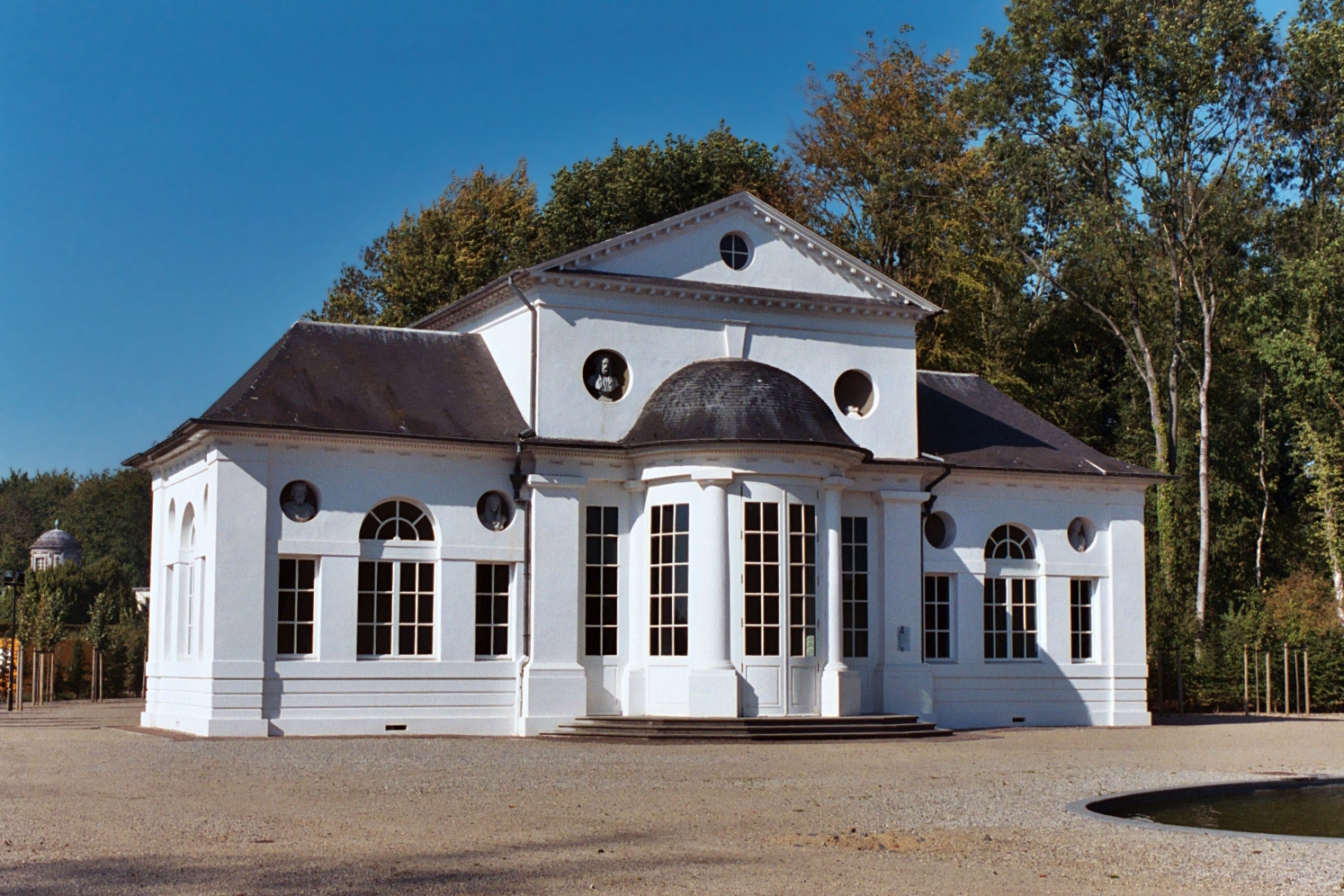
Little theatre of the Château de Seneffe, Seneffe, Charles De Wailly, 1779

==== French period (1792–1815) ====
Since the period of French occupation was characterised by the long-running French Revolutionary and Napoleonic Wars, few outstanding neoclassical works were constructed.

- Ghislain Joseph Henry (already active under the Austrian period)

Orangery and temple near Wespelaar (1798)

- 1791 L. Radelet

Château de la Tour au Bois in Villers-le-Temple (1791)

- 1805 A. Dubois

Château de Sélys-Longchamps in Waremme (1805)

- 1806 J.F. Van Gierdegom

Governor's Residence in Bruges (1806)

- 1807 J.J. Dutry

Château Gavergracht in Drongen (1807)

==== Dutch Period (1815–30) ====
In 1815, the Southern Netherlands were united by the Congress of Vienna with the Dutch United Provinces to form the new Dutch-led United Kingdom of the Netherlands.

Under William I, many of the most significant neoclassical buildings were constructed in Brussels, including the Academy Palace, the Royal Theatre of La Monnaie, the Botanical Gardens, the Royal Observatory and the Royal Palace, precursor of the modern palace.

- Ghislain-Joseph Henry (already active under the Austrian period)

Connection of the Hôtel Bender and Belgiojoso (constructed by Montoyer in 1785) to create the palace of William I in Brussels (1820)

- 1815 Charles Vander Straeten

Academy Palace and Royal Stables of Brussels (planned in 1815, built 1823–25), work on the Palace of the Nation (1816–18), Ball room of the Vauxhall of Brussels (after 1820)
(See below for his works after 1830)

- 1816 Louis Roelandt

Aula Academica in Ghent (1816–25), Liberal club of Geraardsbergen (1817), Neoclassical tower of Ninove Abbey (1826–44), south wing of Aalst Town Hall (1828–30)
(See below for his works after 1830)

- 1818 Louis Damesme (French architect)

Royal Theatre of La Monnaie in Brussels (1818–19) (not the current building, which was built by Joseph Poelaert), Street surrounding the theatre (designed 1817–19)

- 1824 Nicolas Roget (French architect)

Place des Barricades/Barricadenplein in Brussels (1824), extension of the Palace of Charles of Lorraine (1825), former Royal Observatory of Brussels (1826–32, with Auguste Payen)

- 1825 Tilman-François Suys

Completion of the Academy Palace (1825–28), designs of the Botanical Gardens of Brussels (1826, construction started by Pierre-François Gineste, then resumed in 1842 by Suys)
(See below for his works after 1830)

- 1825 Bruno Renard

Grand Hornu (1825)
(See below for his works after 1830)

- 1826 Pierre Bruno Bourla

Orangery of the Botanical Garden of Antwerp (1826, demolished), French Royal Theatre (known as the "Bourla Theatre") in Antwerp (1827–34)
(See below for his works after 1830)

- 1827 Henri Partoes

Pacheco Hospice (1827), Orangery of the Château de Belœil (1830)

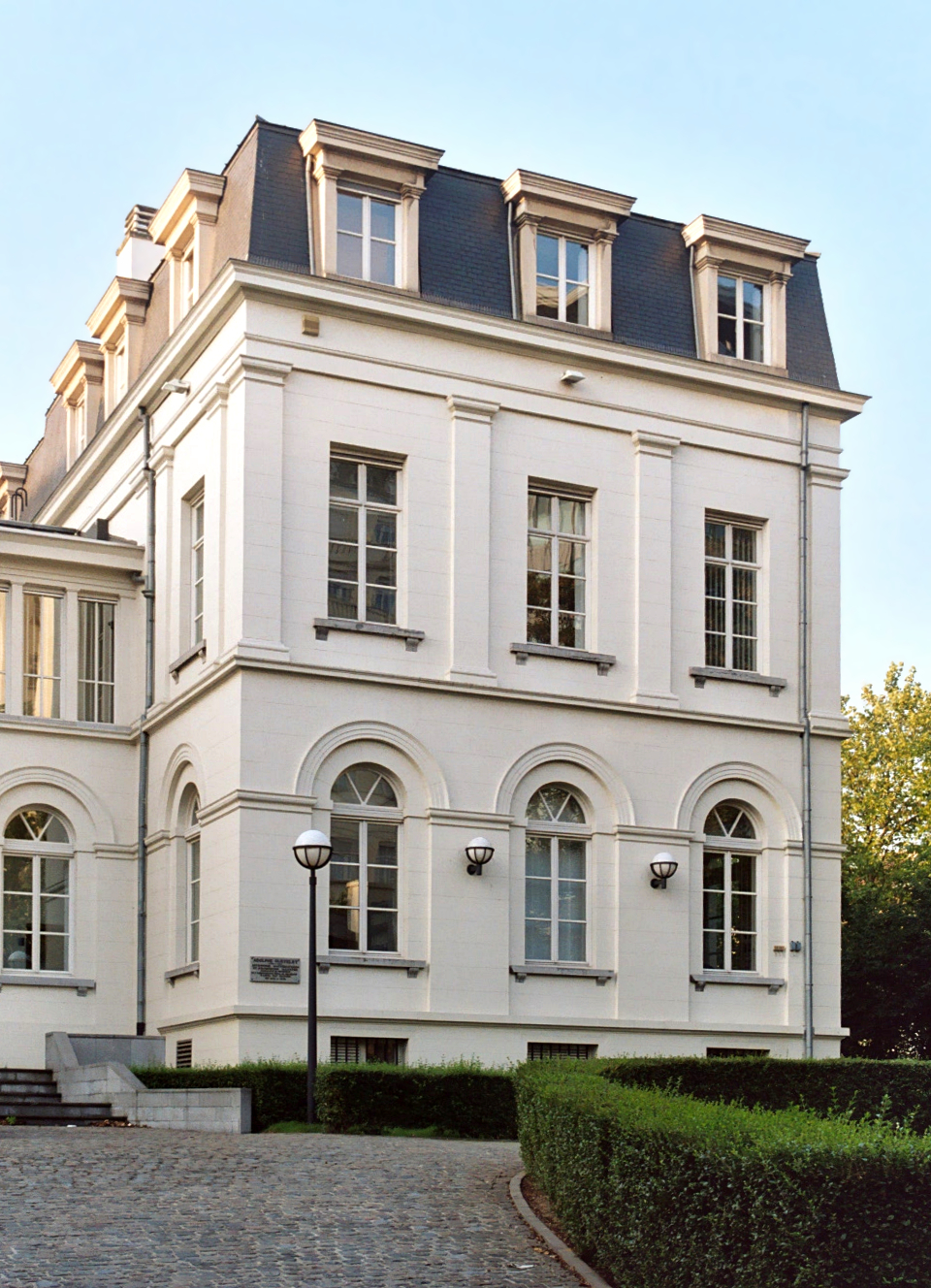
Royal Observatory of Belgium, Uccle, Nicolas Roget and Auguste Payen, 1826–32

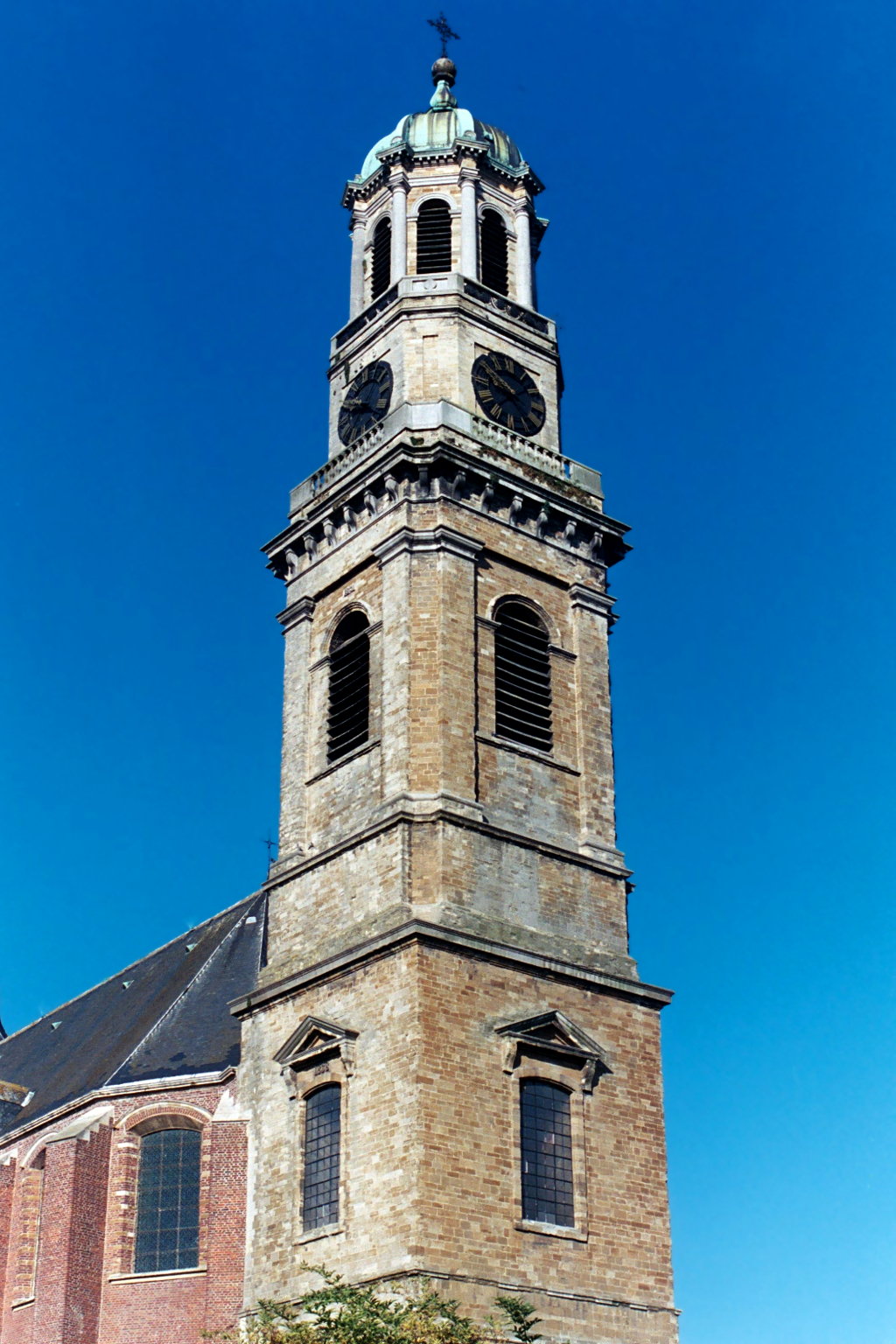
Ninove Abbey bell tower, Ninove, Louis Roelandt, 1826–44

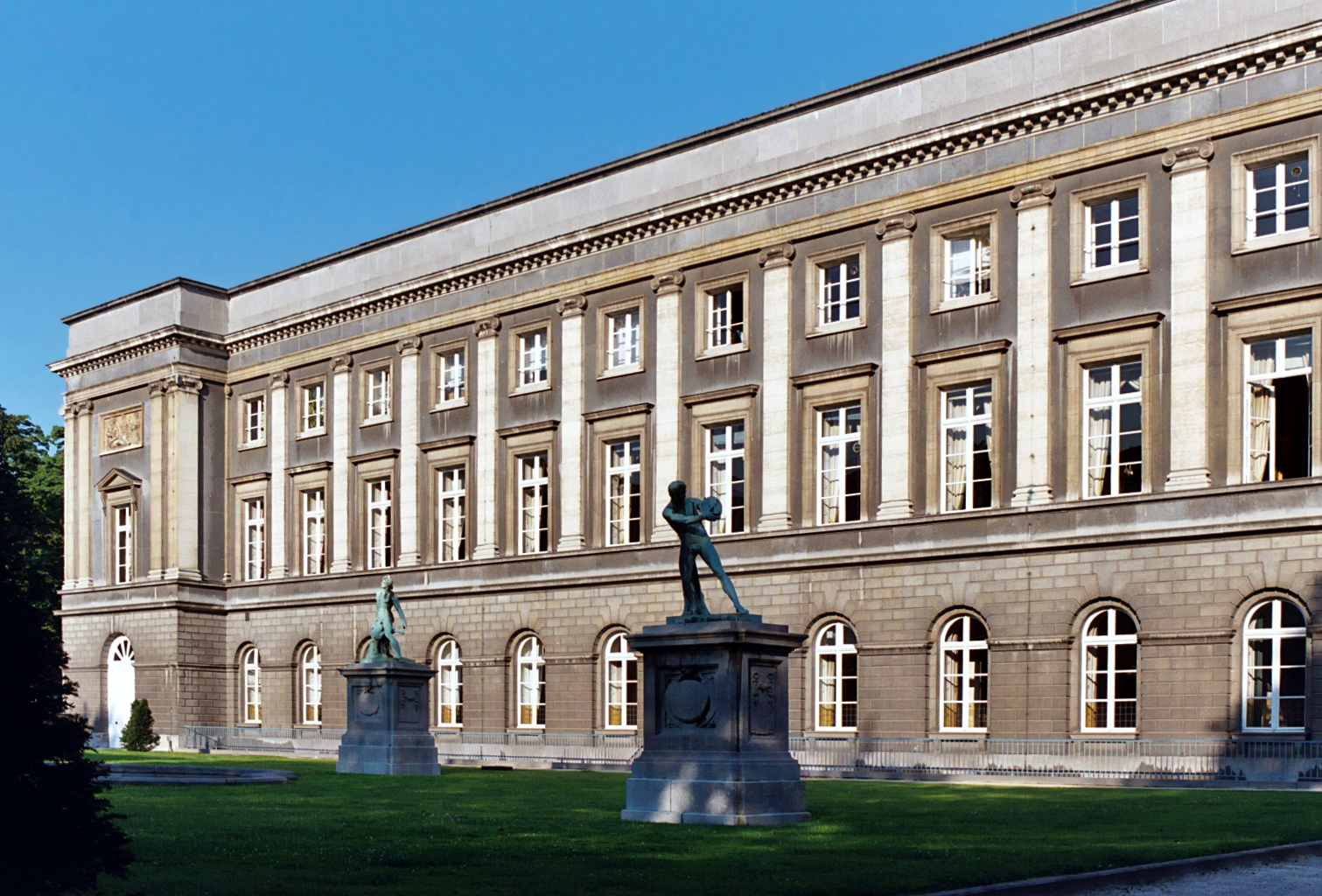
Academy Palace (rear facade), Brussels, Charles Vander Straeten, 1815–25

==== Reign of Leopold I (1830–65) ====
Architects already active under the United Kingdom of the Netherlands

- Louis Roelandt

Royal Opera of Ghent (1837–40), Hall of the Sint-Truiden Academy (1845)

- Cluysenaar family

Family of famous architects and artists

- Charles Vander Straeten

Maison de la Malibran (current Ixelles Municipal Hall, 1835)

- Tilman-François Suys

Plans of the Leopold Quarter (1837), extension of the Botanical Gardens of Brussels (1842–54), modification of the Church of St. James on Coudenberg (side-aisles 1843–45, new front to the facade and bell tower 1849–51), Saint Joseph's Church in Brussels (1849), modification of the Palace of the Nation (Senate Chamber, 1847–49)

- Bruno Renard

Place Saint-Pierre in Tournai (c. 1850)

- Pierre Bruno Bourla

Museum and entry hall of the Academy of Fine Arts in Antwerp (1841)

New Architects

- 1835 Frans Drossaert

Tienen Town Hall (1835–36)

- 1836 Auguste Payen

Former Royal Observatory of Brussels (1826–32, led by Nicolas Roget), Pavilions of the Anderlecht Gate (1832), Pavilions of the Ninove Gate (1832–34), Pavilions of the Namur Gate (1836), Great Lock of Brussels (1840), several railway stations, of which the oldest is the former Brussels-South railway station (1864–69, destroyed)

- 1841 Louis Minard

Church of Saint Martin in Melle (1841), Orangery of the horticultural school of Melle, Church of St. Adrien of Adegem (1843–44), Minard Theatre in Ghent (1847)

- 1847 J.P.J. Peeters and G. Hansotte

Church of St. John and Nicholas in Schaerbeek (1847–50)

- 1849 Joseph Poelaert

Poelaert was an eclectic architect who has some neoclassical achievements to his credit

Extension of Place des Barricades (1849), restoration of La Monnaie theatre following a fire (1855–60)

- 1855 Émile Coulon

Church of St. Martin in Quenast (1855), Church of St. Michael in Nivelles (Monstreux) (1859)

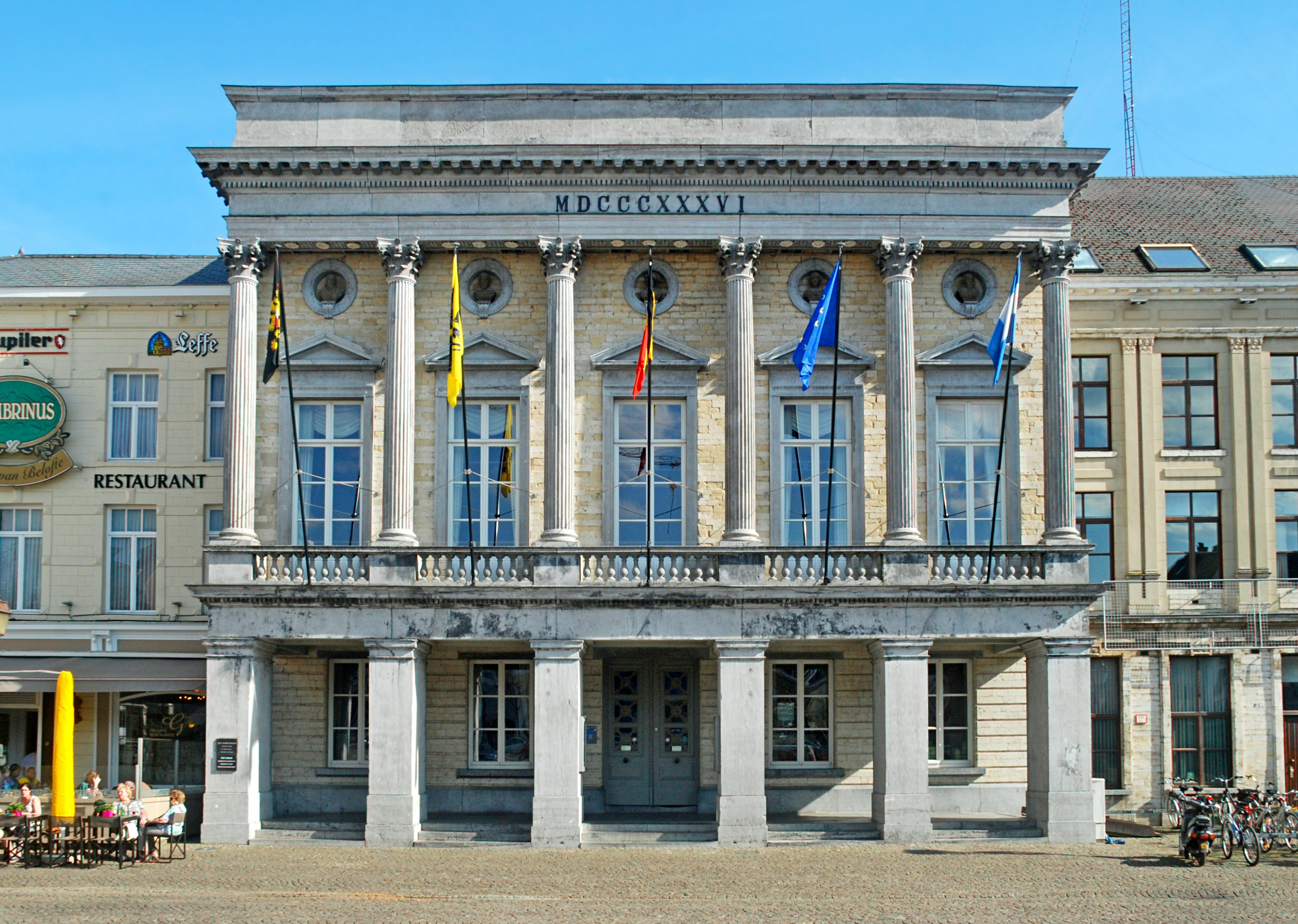
Tienen Town Hall, Frans Drossaert, 1835–36

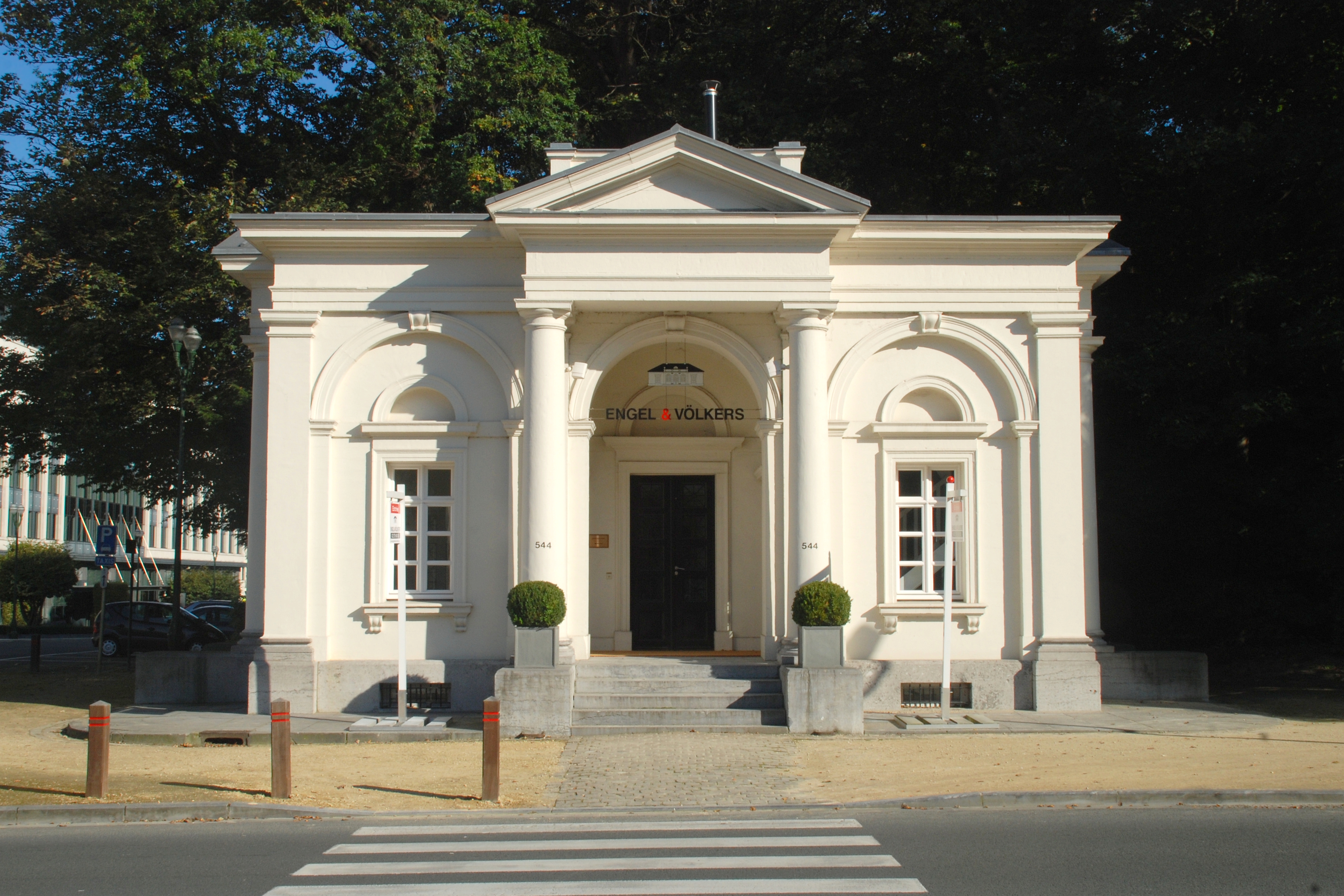
Former pavilions of the Namur Gate, Brussels, Auguste Payen, 1836

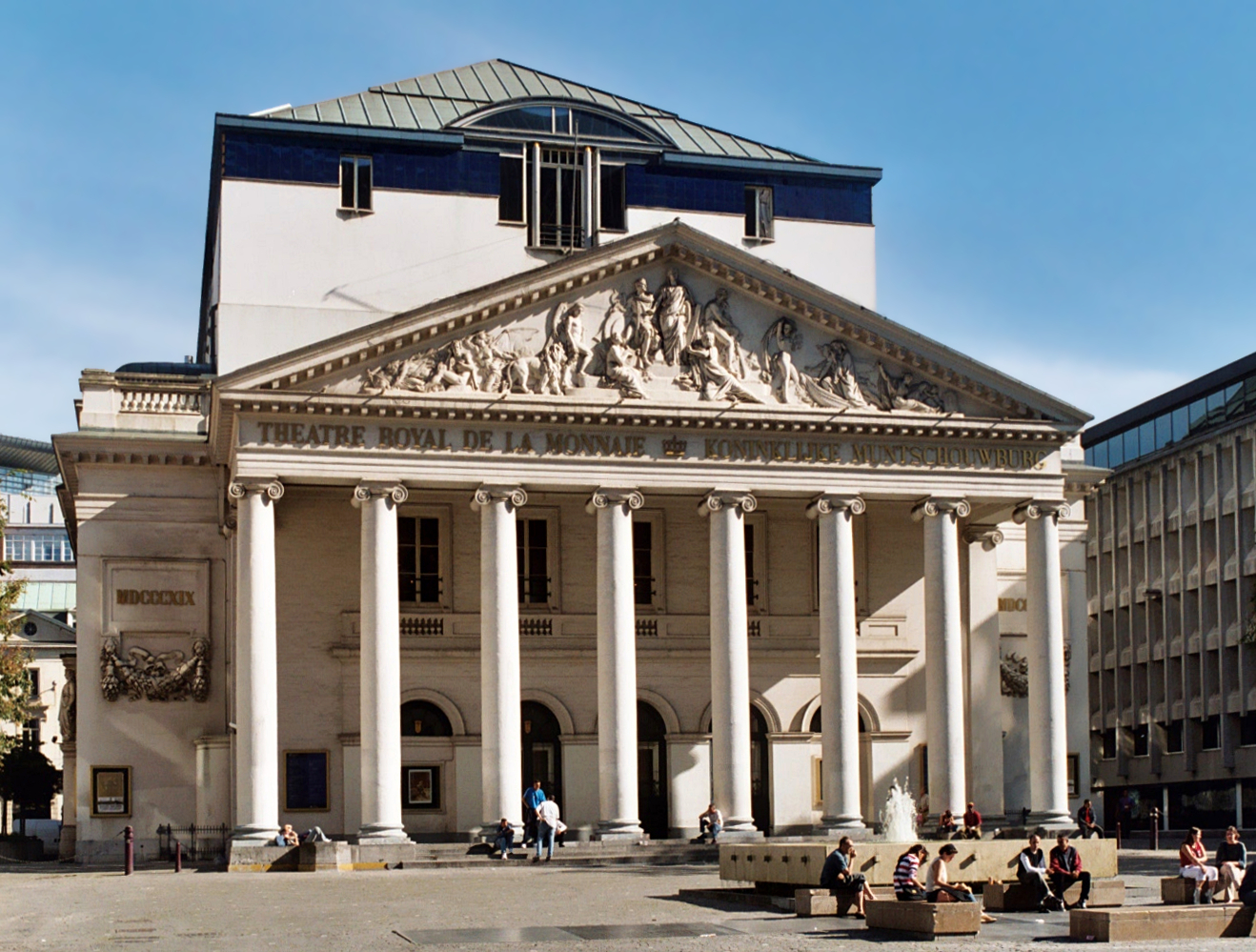
Royal Theatre of La Monnaie Brussels, Joseph Poelaert, 1849

=== Neoclassical Eclecticism (1865–1909) ===
King Leopold II (1865–1909) was a prodigious builder, who launched various constructions of large buildings to demonstrate the prestige of the monarchy. However, during his reign, the Eclectic style, which appeared with Poelaert under Leopold I, became predominant, mixing various forms from neo-Romanesque, neo-Gothic, neo-Renaissance and neo-Baroque, as well as the neoclassical schools.

Neoclassicism under Leopold II was no exception. Some buildings from this period, such as the Bourse Palace and the Palace of Justice were openly eclectic; others cited below, can be broadly considered as neoclassical, without exempting them, however, from the banner of characteristic decorative eclecticism.

Note that many of the buildings commissioned by Leopold II incorporated his monogram, consisting of two symmetrical "L" letters.

- 1867 Hendrik Beyaert (notable eclectic architect)

Cité Fontainas (with the architect Trappeniers, 1867), work on the Senate building (1883–86)

- 1875 Gédéon Bordiau

Design of the Squares Quarter (1875), work on La Monnaie theatre (1876), Cinquantenaire Palace: colonnades (1880), north and north-eastern halls (1880, now the Royal Museum of the Armed Forces), south-eastern hall, known as the Palace of the People (1888, now Autoworld), extension of the Senate Chamber (1903), all in Brussels

- 1892 Charles Thirion

Great Theatre of Verviers (1892)

- 1897 Albert-Philippe Aldophe

Palace of the Colonies in Tervuren (1897)

- 1902 Charles Girault (French architect)

Extension of the Royal Palace of Laeken (1902), Cinquantenaire Arcade (1904), Royal Galleries of Ostend (1905), Royal Museum for Central Africa in Tervuren (1905–10)

- 1904 Henri Maquet

Facade of the Royal Palace of Brussels (1904), Royal Military Academy in Brussels (1907, with Henri Van Dievoet)

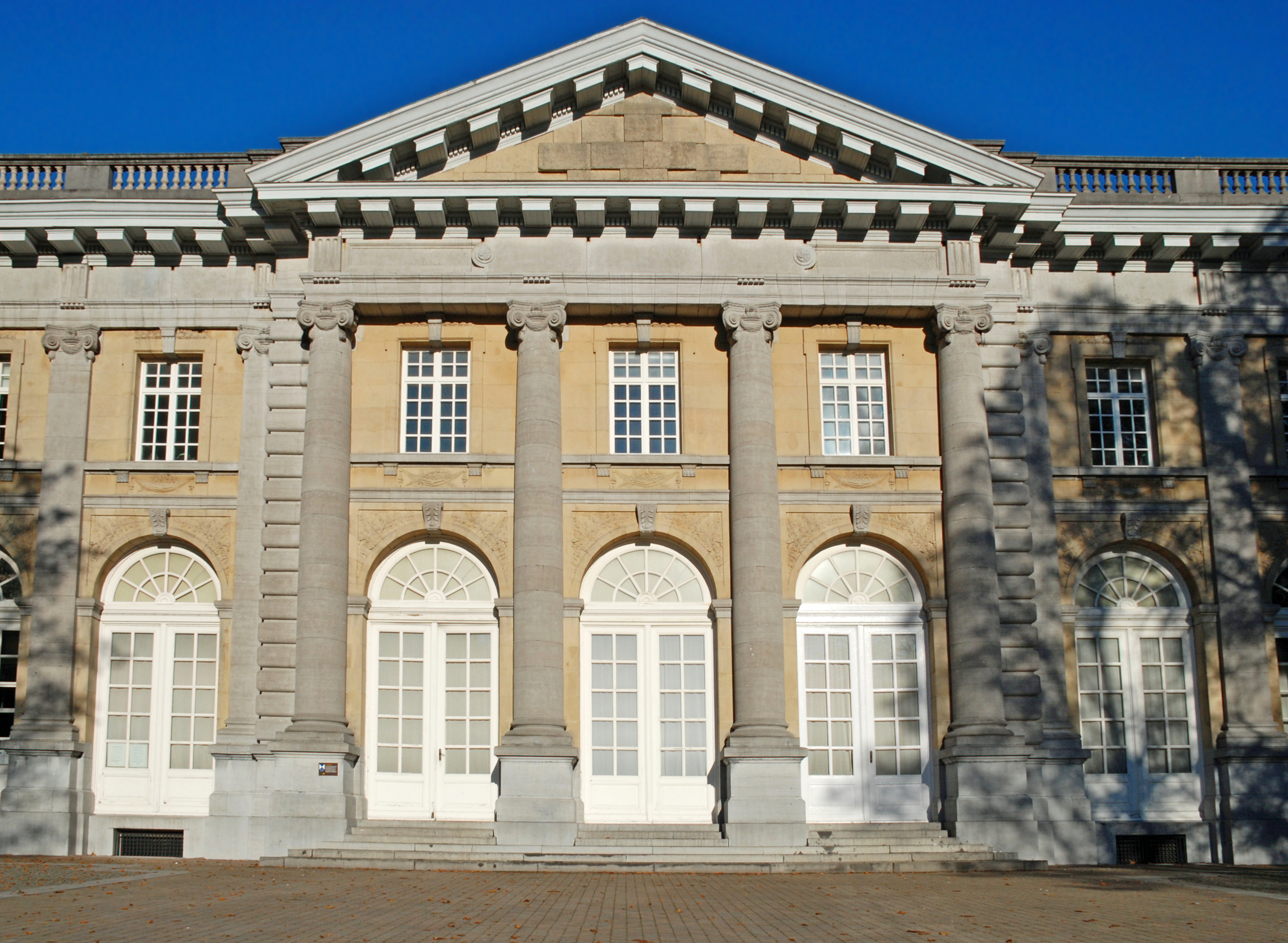
Palace of the Colonies, Tervuren, Albert-Philippe Aldophe, 1897

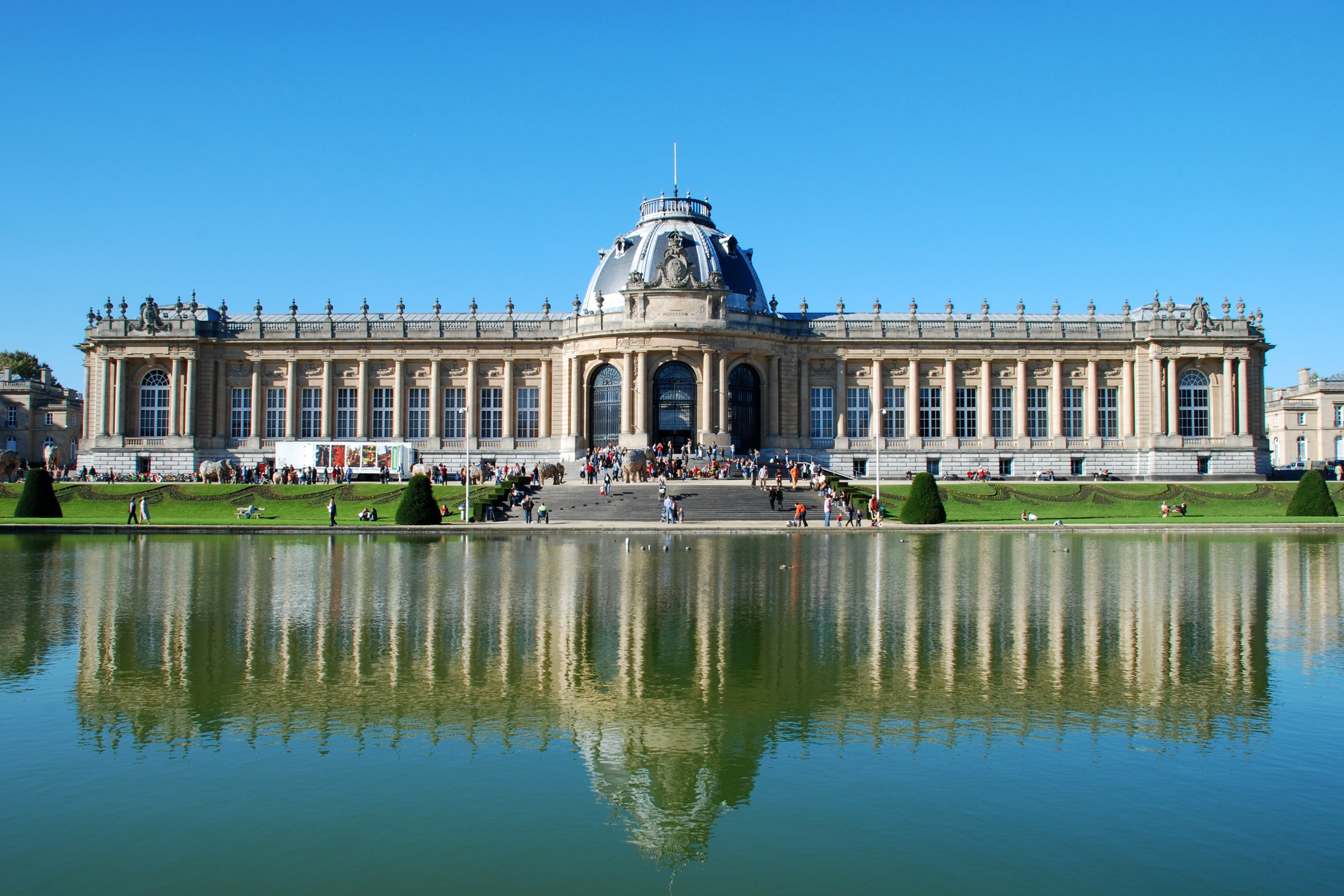
Royal Museum for Central Africa, Tervuren, Charles Girault, 1905–10

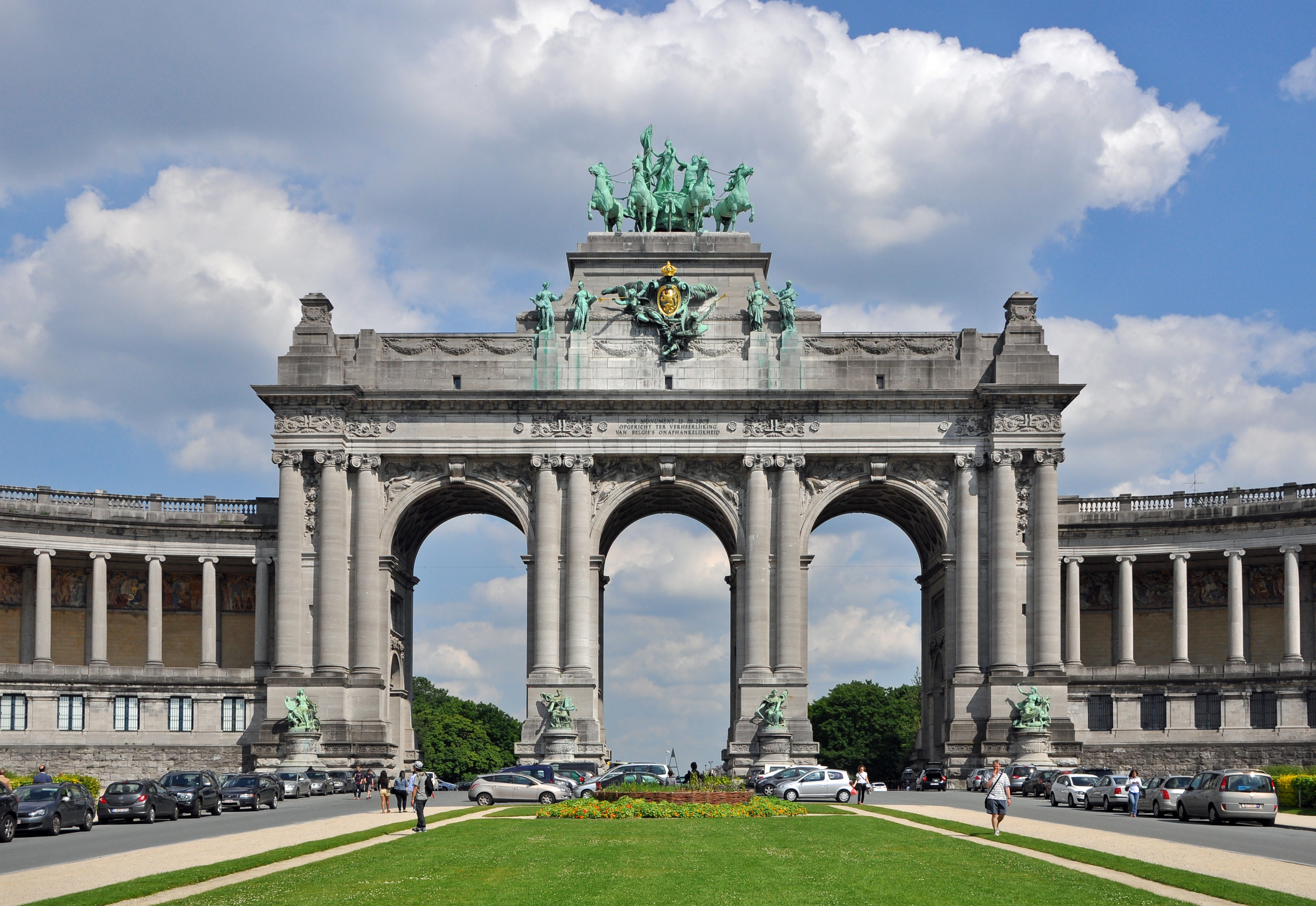
Arcade du Cinquantenaire, Brussels, Gédéon Bordiau and Charles Girault, 1905

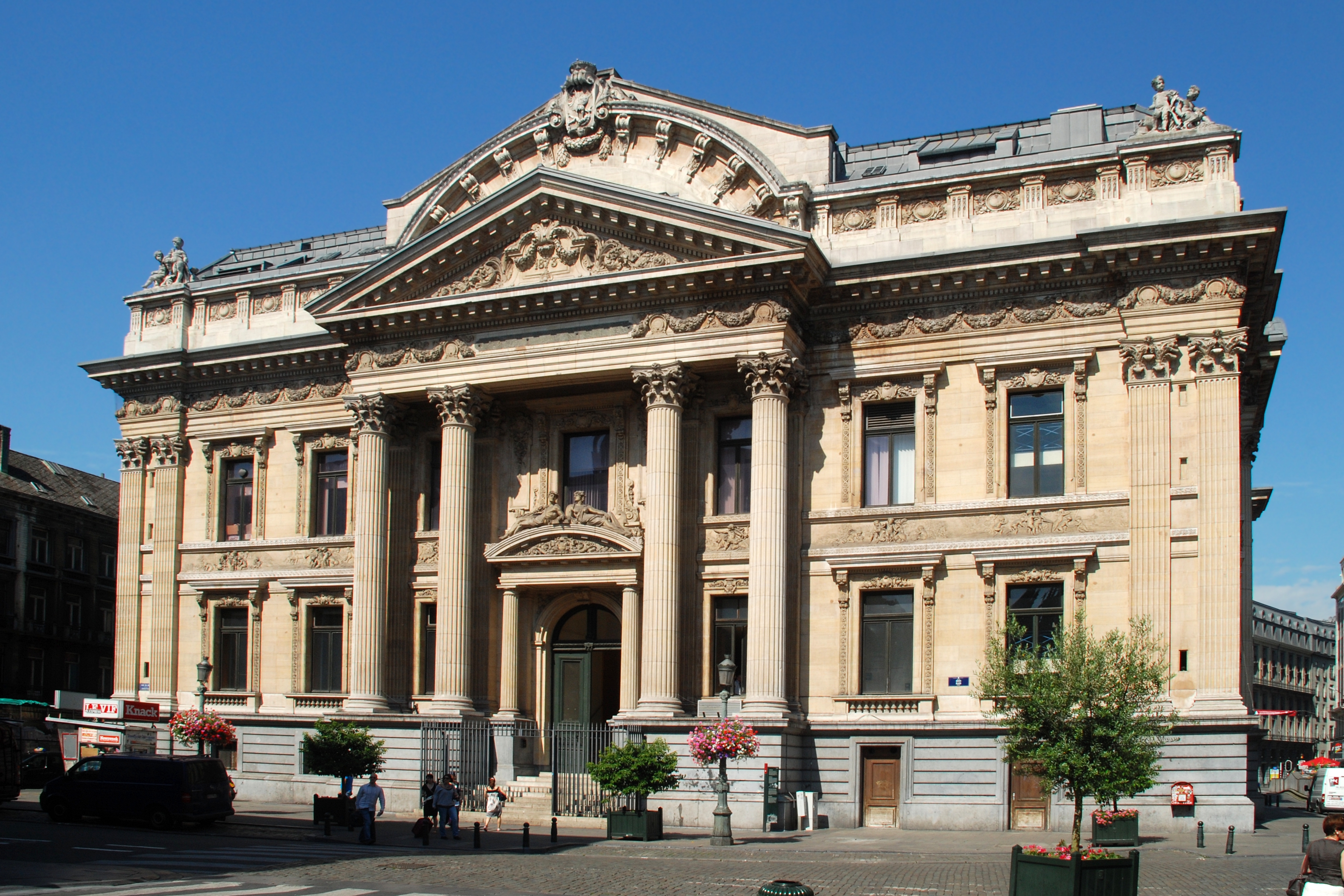
Bourse Palace (rear facade), Brussels, Léon-Pierre Suys, 1868–73

=== Late Neoclascissism (1910–80) ===
In the 20th century, neoclassicism nearly disappeared from the Belgian architectural landscape, swept away by new waves of architectural styles including Art Nouveau (which was very popular in Brussels, see Art Nouveau in Brussels), Art Deco, Modernism and Functionalism.

In Brussels, the survival of the style is owed to the planning laws governing the construction of buildings in the vicinity of Brussels Park, as well as the desire to preserve the stylistic unity of the neighbourhood.

- 1910 François Malfait

Château de la Solitude in Auderghem (1910–12)

- 1920 Oscar Van de Voorde

Belgische Bank van de Arbeid in Ghent (1920)

- 1930 Michel Polak

Tractebel Headquarters in Brussels (1930)

- 1950 André and Jean Polak

"Royal Atrium" at 60–68, rue Royale/Koningsstraat, in Brussels (1950–59)

- 1966 Christian Housiaux, Hugo Van Kuyck, Pierre Guillissen

Headquarters of the Société Générale de Belgique at 20–40, rue Royale, in Brussels (1966–80)

- 1972–74 Christian et Jean-Pierre Housiaux

Extension of the headquarters of the Union Minière du Haut Katanga at 21, rue du Marais/Broekstraat, in Brussels (1977)

==== Monumentalist Classical Architecture (1929–59) ====
During the Interwar period, a style developed in several European countries using neoclassical architecture on a much bigger (monumental) scale.

In the 1930s, this was often associated with totalitarian regimes like Nazi Germany, but the style is often wrongly labeled as Fascist architecture like Stalinist architecture, Nazi architecture or Soft Portuguese style. However, it was also found in democratic countries like Belgium, France (for instance the Palais de Chaillot), Great Britain and the United States.

=== Postmodernism (after 1980) ===
At the end of the 20th century, neoclassicism reappeared in a revitalised form incorporated in the Postmodern style. This postmodern neoclassicism is most commonly used in the construction of offices and municipal buildings.

- 1989 Ricardo Bofill (Spanish architect)

Headquarters of SWIFT in La Hulpe (1989)

- 1989 José Vanden Bossche

"Orion Center" (IWT), at 21-25, boulevard Bischoffsheim/Bischoffsheimlaan, in Brussels (with Fr. Schilling)

- 1993 Bureau d'architectes ASSAR

Town square of Auderghem (1993–94)
"Goemaere" ("Thilly Van Eessel I"), at 1945, chaussée de Wavre/Waversesteenweg, in Brussels (1988–98)

- 1994 Wolf et Conreur

"Rozendal Business Park", at 6, Terhulpsesteenweg and 2, Albert I-laan, in Hoeilaart)

- 1995 Jacques Cuisinier

Hôtel Méridien in Brussels, opposite Brussels Central Station (1995)

- 1996 "Roosevelt Business Park", at 104, Avenue Roosevelt, in Genval)
