= Sewer Museum =

Museum in Brussels, Belgium

- Musée des Égouts (French); Riolenmuseum (Dutch)
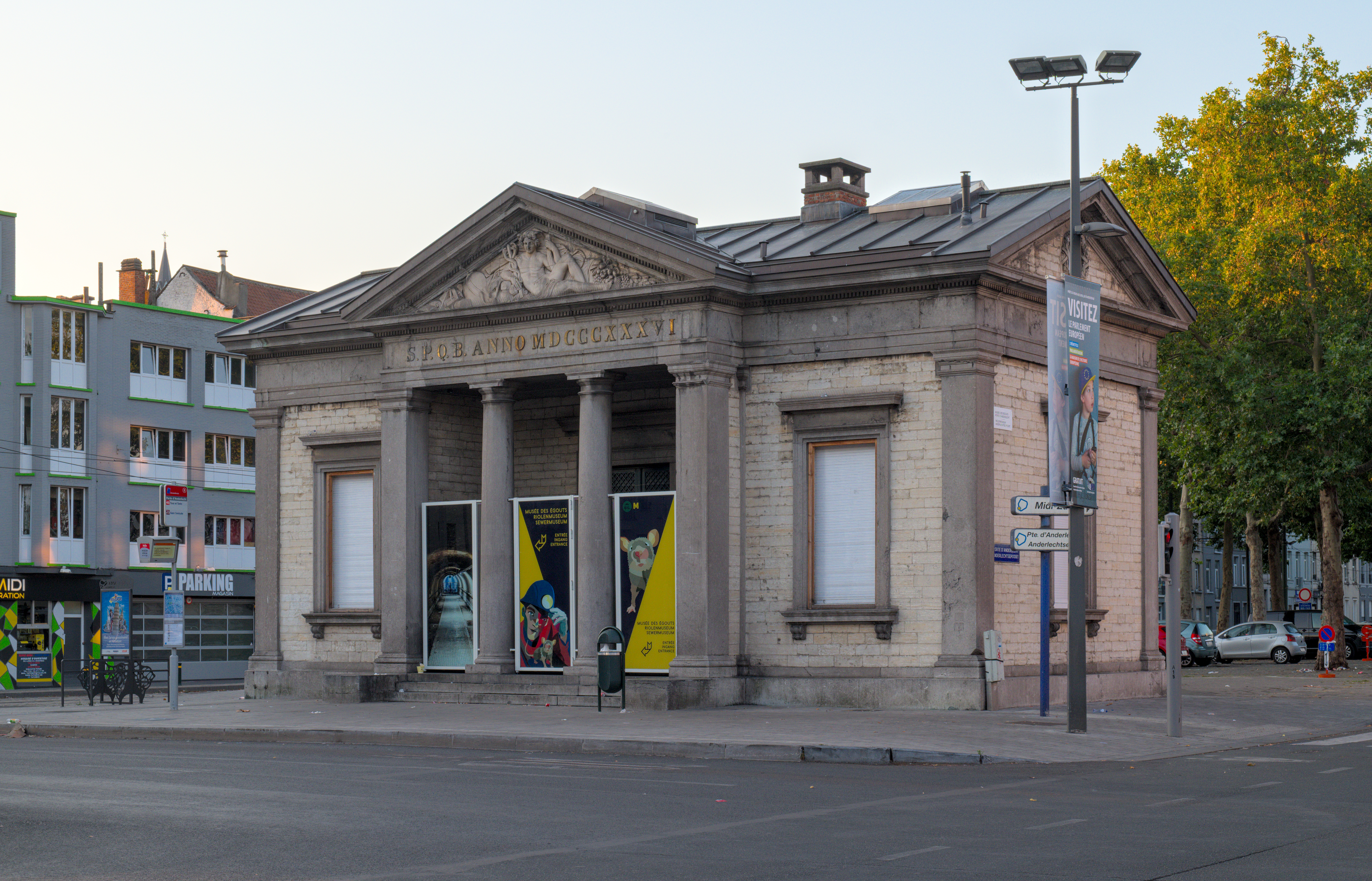
- Exterior of the museum
- Interactive fullscreen map
- Established: 1988; 38 years ago
- Location: Anderlecht Gate, 1000 City of Brussels, Brussels-Capital Region, Belgium
- Coordinates: 50°50′41″N 4°20′20″E
- Website: sewermuseum.brussels/en

The Sewer Museum (French: Musée des Égouts; Dutch: Riolenmuseum) is a museum in Brussels, Belgium, dedicated to the city's sewage system. Opened in 1988, the museum allows visitors to walk along a 50-meter stretch of a sewer tunnel. It has a noticeable stench, and liquid sewage runs below visitors' feet.

The museum presents the history of sewage including the Senne river being moved underground in the 19th century, environmental concerns regarding sewage, and the work of égoutiers, or sewer workers, who work in underground sewage tunnels. Its entrance is located at the Anderlecht Gate, in a neoclassical former octroi pavilion designed by Auguste Payen.

== History ==
In the 1980s, the City of Brussels' Sewage Department frequently received requests to organize tours to its underground network. This led to the idea of creating the Sewer Museum, which opened on 30 May 1988.

Initially owned by the City of Brussels' water authority, the museum became the property of Brussels' Culture Department in 2010. That same year, Vivaqua, the former Compagnie intercommunale bruxelloise des eaux (CIBE), was entrusted with the maintenance and management of the sewers. The museum was renovated in 2007, and again in 2014, reopening in 2015.

== Building ==
The museum is housed in the basement of one of the two neoclassical former octroi pavilions (French: pavillons d'octroi) at the Anderlecht Gate, with the other serving as a sewer workers' room. The buildings, designed by the architect Auguste Payen, were constructed in 1836 and have remained standing even after the octroi was abolished in 1860.

== Exhibits ==
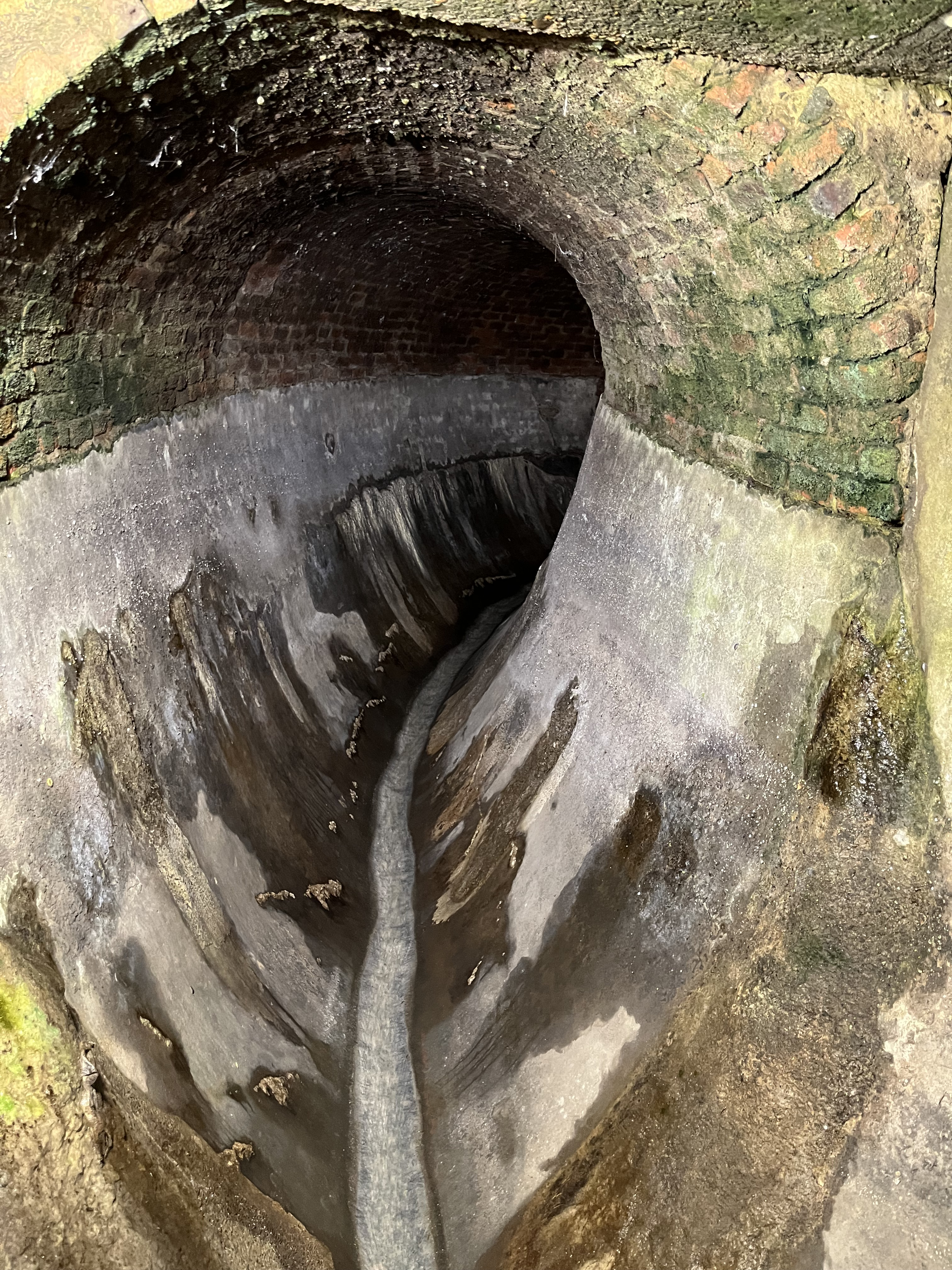
Operational sewers can be seen at the Sewer Museum.

=== Permanent exhibition ===
The Sewer Museum presents the history and operations of the approximately 350 kilometer network of underground brick tunnels that carry waste below Brussels' city center. Prior to the construction of the pipes in the 19th century, the Senne river flowed throughout the city center and collected sewage and waste. In 1865, 3,500 people died in a cholera outbreak that was linked to the Senne, and city authorities intensified efforts to move the river underground. Approximately 45 kilometers of vaulted brick tunnels were built by 1847, and approximately 110 kilometers of tunnels were built by 1879.

=== Temporary exhibitions ===
The museum hosts rotating exhibitions in addition to its main exhibits. In 2018, it solicited photographs of toilet graffiti from local residents for an exhibition titled "Protest in the Toilet" in honor of the 50th anniversary of the May 1968 revolts in France and Belgium. In 2023, an exhibit dedicated to rats opened at the museum.

A light show was installed in the sewer in 2026.

== Visit and events ==
In November 2023, Bill Gates visited the museum to commemorate World Toilet Day. This led to a marked increase in attendance at the Sewer Museum.

In 2025, two musicians, including Miguel Mulders, a contrabass performer in the Belgian National Orchestra, performed a concert in the sewers.

== See also ==
- List of museums in Brussels
- History of Brussels
- Belgium in the long nineteenth century
