= Linsmeau =

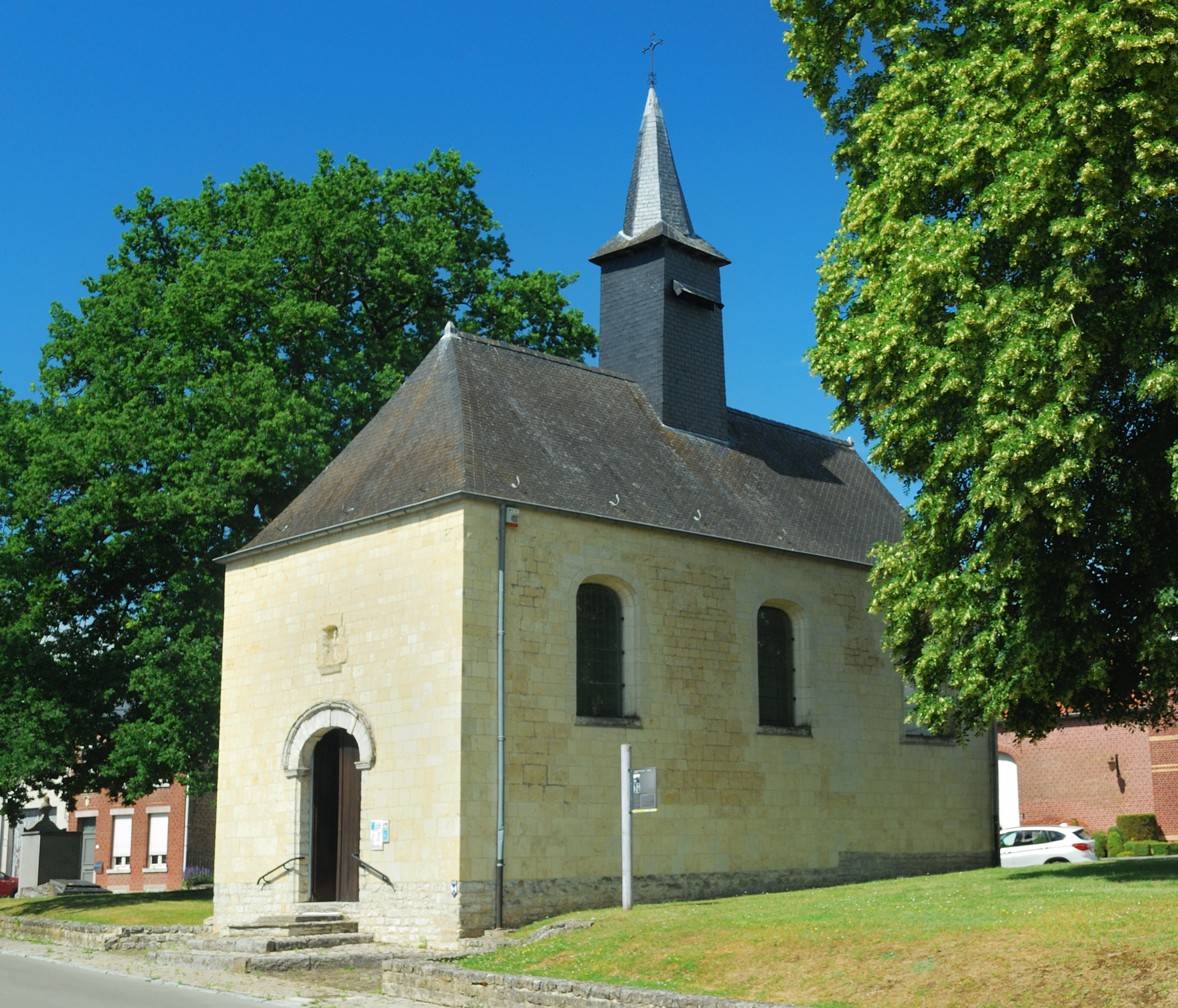
- Linsmeau, Chapelle Notre-Dame de la Colombe (Linsmeau)

- Location within Belgium Location within Europe
- Coordinates: 50°40′49″N 04°50′20″E
- Country: Belgium
- Region: Wallonia
- Province: Walloon Brabant
- Municipality: Hélécine

Linsmeau is a village and district of the municipality of Hélécine, located in the province of Walloon Brabant, Belgium.

The village has been settled at least since the Middle Ages. During World War I, 22 civilians of the village were executed on 10 August 1914 by German troops (part of the Rape of Belgium).

The village church dates from 1774. There is also a chapel in the village, the Chapelle Notre-Dame de la Colombe (Linsmeau). It was founded in 1299 by the knight Jean de Racour. According to legend, he made the vow to build a chapel during a battle. If he would survive, he promised to found a chapel at the first place where he would spot a white dove.
