= Anderlecht Gate =

Former city gate in Brussels, Belgium

- Porte d'Anderlecht (French); Anderlechtsepoort (Dutch)
- Part of the second city walls of Brussels
- Brussels, Belgium
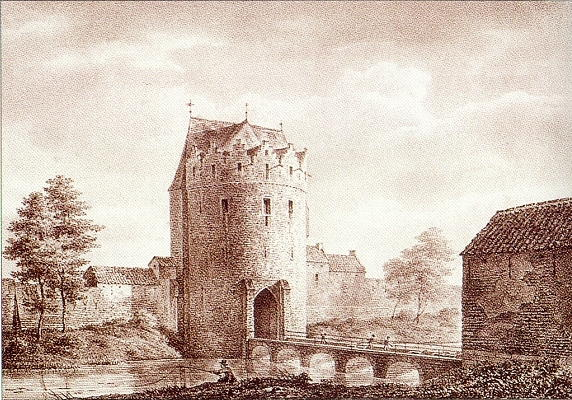
- The Anderlecht Gate at the end of the 18th century

Site information
- Type: City gate

Location
- Location within Brussels Anderlecht Gate (Belgium)
- Coordinates: 50°50′41″N 4°20′20″E

Site history
- Built: 14th century
- Materials: Stone

The Anderlecht Gate (French: Porte d'Anderlecht; Dutch: Anderlechtsepoort) was one of the medieval city gates of the second walls of Brussels, Belgium. Built in the 14th century and popularly known as Ter Cruyskene, it was one of the major entry points on the city's south-western side to Anderlecht. The gatehouse was repurposed as a prison and finally demolished in 1784 during the construction of the Small Ring (Brussels' inner ring road). Two pavilion-like buildings were built on the site to collect the octroi in 1836. Although redundant since 1860, these pavilions survive and one currently houses the Sewer Museum.

Anderlecht Gate remains a toponym denoting the site of the former gate on the edge of the City of Brussels and the Cureghem/Kuregem district in Anderlecht. This area is served by Brussels-South railway station, as well as the tram stop Porte d'Anderlecht/Anderlechtsepoort, to which it gives its name.

== History ==
Built in 1359, the Anderlecht Gate was one of the seven city gates of the second set of defensive walls that enclosed Brussels. In the Middle Ages, it was also referred to popularly as Ter Cruyskene ("At the Cross"), and was one of the major entry points on the city's south-western side where the road lead through to the nearby village of Anderlecht. The original gate included a portcullis and drawbridge over a moat.

The guarding of the Anderlecht Gate was entrusted to the House of Serroelofs, one of the Seven Noble Houses of Brussels, in 1383. It was assisted from 1422 by the Nation of St Christopher, one of the Guilds of Brussels. The gate's attic was one of the many places where the city council stored grain. A certain Jan Boone was given permission in 1638 to build two windmills on the ramparts near the gate.

The gatehouse in the disused city walls was transformed into a prison in 1747 and finally torn down in 1784. The destruction of the medieval city walls between 1818 and 1840 allowed the creation of a series of wide open boulevards collectively referred to as the Small Ring. On the site of the former gate, two small pavilion-like buildings (French: pavillons d'octroi), designed in the neoclassical style by the architect Auguste Payen, were built in 1836 to collect the octroi on merchandise entering the city. (Note: An inscription on the entablatures recalls the year of construction: "S.P.Q.B. ANNO MDCCCXXXVI" (Senatus populusque bruxellensis anno 1836).) These became redundant after the octroi was abolished and the customs barrier around the city was destroyed by rioters on 20 July 1860.

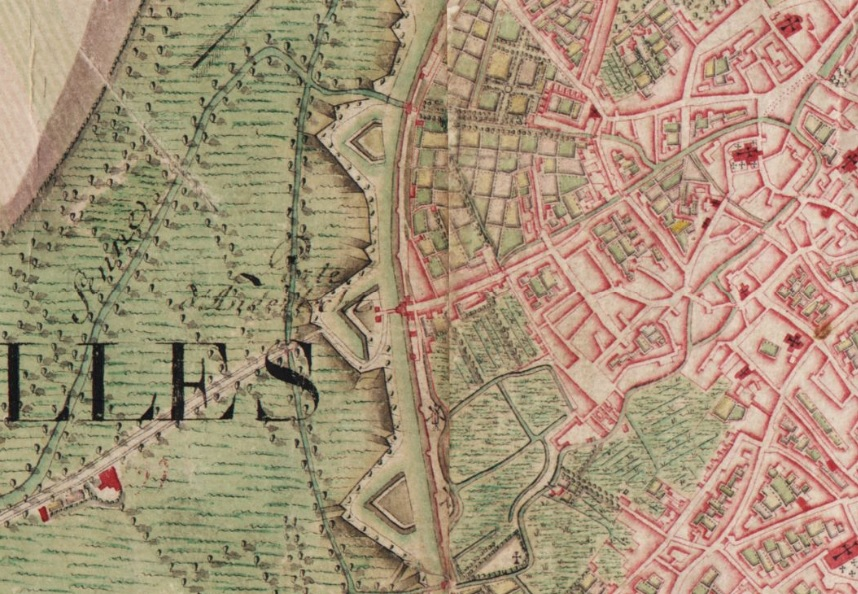
The Anderlecht Gate marked on the 18th-century Ferraris map

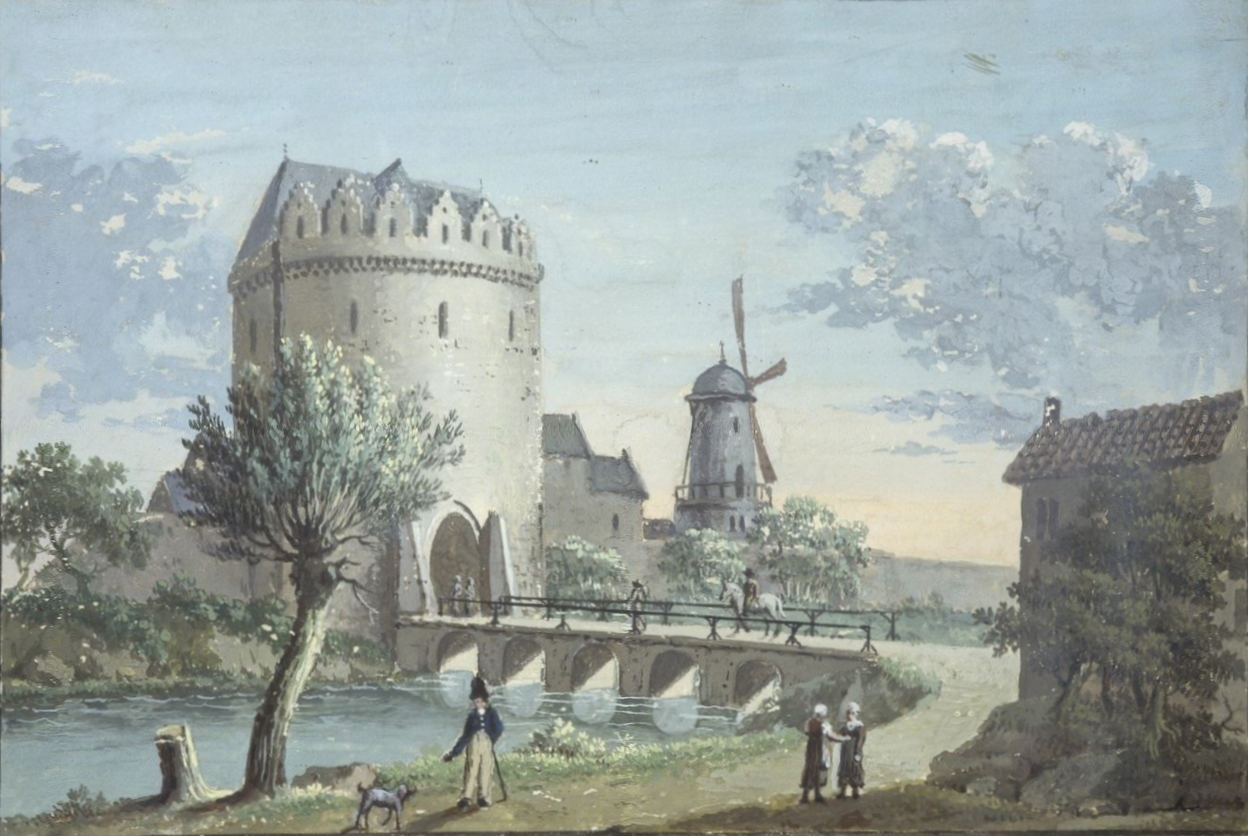
The Anderlecht Gate before 1784, watercolour painting by Louis Spaak after a drawing by Paul Vitzthumb

== Present day ==
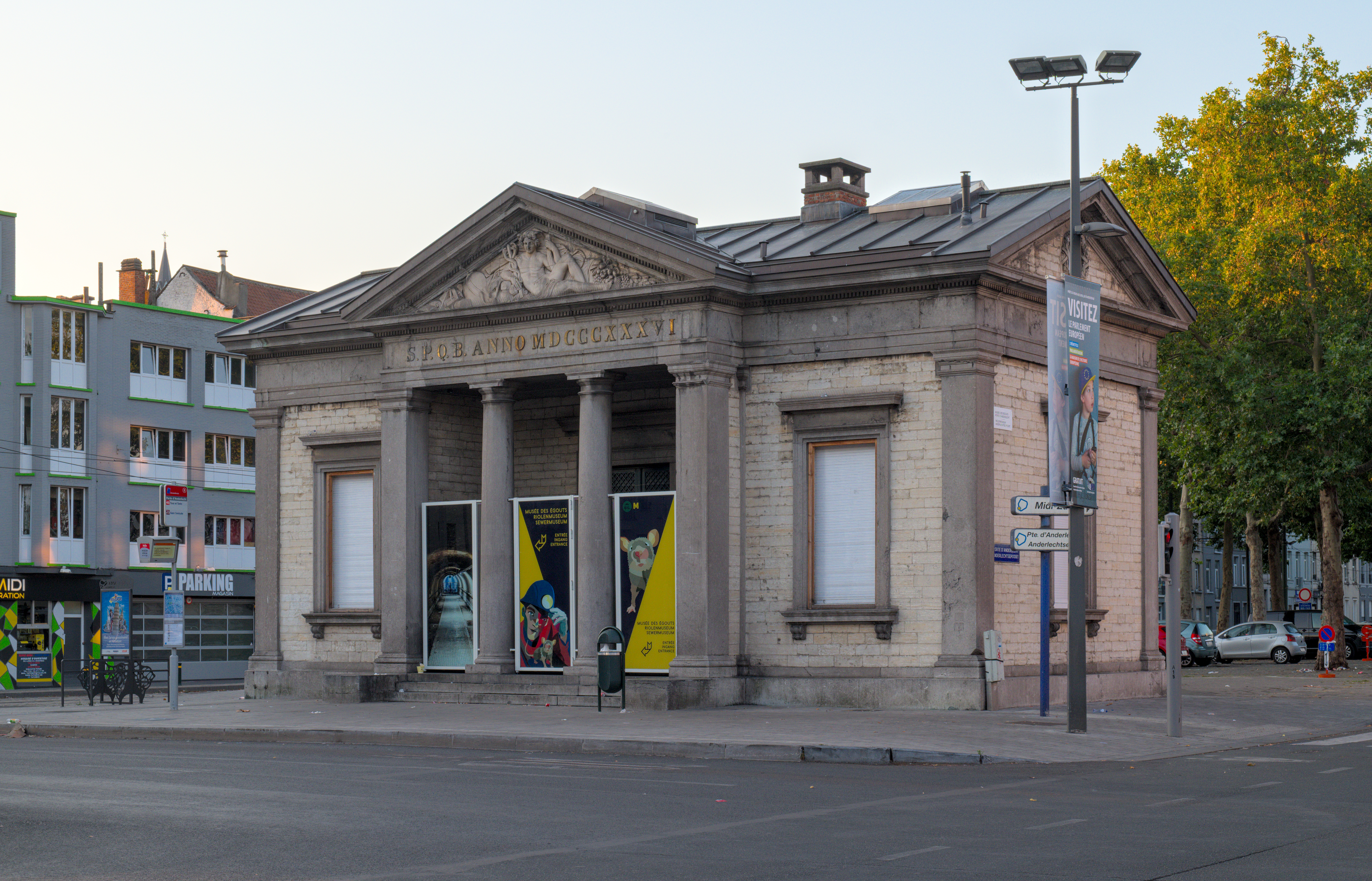
One of the two former octroi pavilions of the Anderlecht Gate, now housing the Sewer Museum

The two pavilions remain intact, though they were moved slightly apart following the diverting of the Senne in 1955. The river, which has been covered and channelled into tunnels for nearly its entire course through the Brussels metropolitan area since the 19th century, was then redirected along the Small Ring and now flows under the pavilions. On the rear façade of the southern pavilion, a bronze plaque commemorates the event. This building has housed the Sewer Museum in its basement since 1988, while the other serves as a sewer workers' room.

As with other historic gates, Anderlecht Gate remains a popular toponym within Brussels to refer to the point at which the Rue d'Anderlecht/Anderlechtsesteenweg joins the Boulevard du Midi/Zuidlaan and the Boulevard Poincaré/Poincarélaan to become the Chaussée de Mons/Bergensesteenweg, giving its name to the nearby tram stop Porte d'Anderlecht/Anderlechtsepoort (on lines 51 and 82).

== See also ==
- Halle Gate, a part of the 14th-century city wall protecting Brussels
- History of Brussels
- Belgium in the long nineteenth century
