= List of protected heritage sites in Hélécine =

This table shows an overview of the protected heritage sites in the Walloon town Hélécine. This list is part of Belgium's national heritage.

Object	Year/architect	Town/section	Address	Coordinates	Number^{?}	Image
Church of Saint-Sulpice ^{(nl)} ^{(fr)}		Hélécine		50.754744°N 4.986929°E	25118-CLT-0001-01 Info	Kerk Saint-Sulpice
Abbey Heylissem, with walls and roof of the castle and two pavilions on either side of the courtyard ^{(nl)} ^{(fr)}		Hélécine		50.746487°N 4.979190°E	25118-CLT-0002-01 Info	Abdij van Heylissem, met gevels en dak van het kasteel en twee paviljoens aan weerszijden van de binnenplaats
Abbey Heylissem: the domed hall of the old church, hall, rear and side walls of the castle, the great dining hall of the castle, moat and entrance pillars, the court of nobles, buildings used as stables, the ice cellar and masonry of a grave ^{(nl)} ^{(fr)}		Hélécine		50.746677°N 4.978823°E	25118-CLT-0003-01 Info	
Chapel of Notre-Dame de la Colombe and environment ^{(nl)} ^{(fr)}		Hélécine		50.733358°N 5.003365°E	25118-CLT-0004-01 Info	
Sunken road "Longa" ^{(nl)} ^{(fr)}		Hélécine		50.769485°N 4.981712°E	25118-CLT-0005-01 Info	
Wall along the ancient abbey of Heylissem ^{(nl)} ^{(fr)}		Hélécine		50.747308°N 4.976960°E	25118-CLT-0006-01 Info	

== See also ==
- Lists of protected heritage sites in Walloon Brabant
- Hélécine
