= Château d'Hélécine =

Monastery in Hélécine, Belgium

Coordinates: 50.746°N 4.978°E

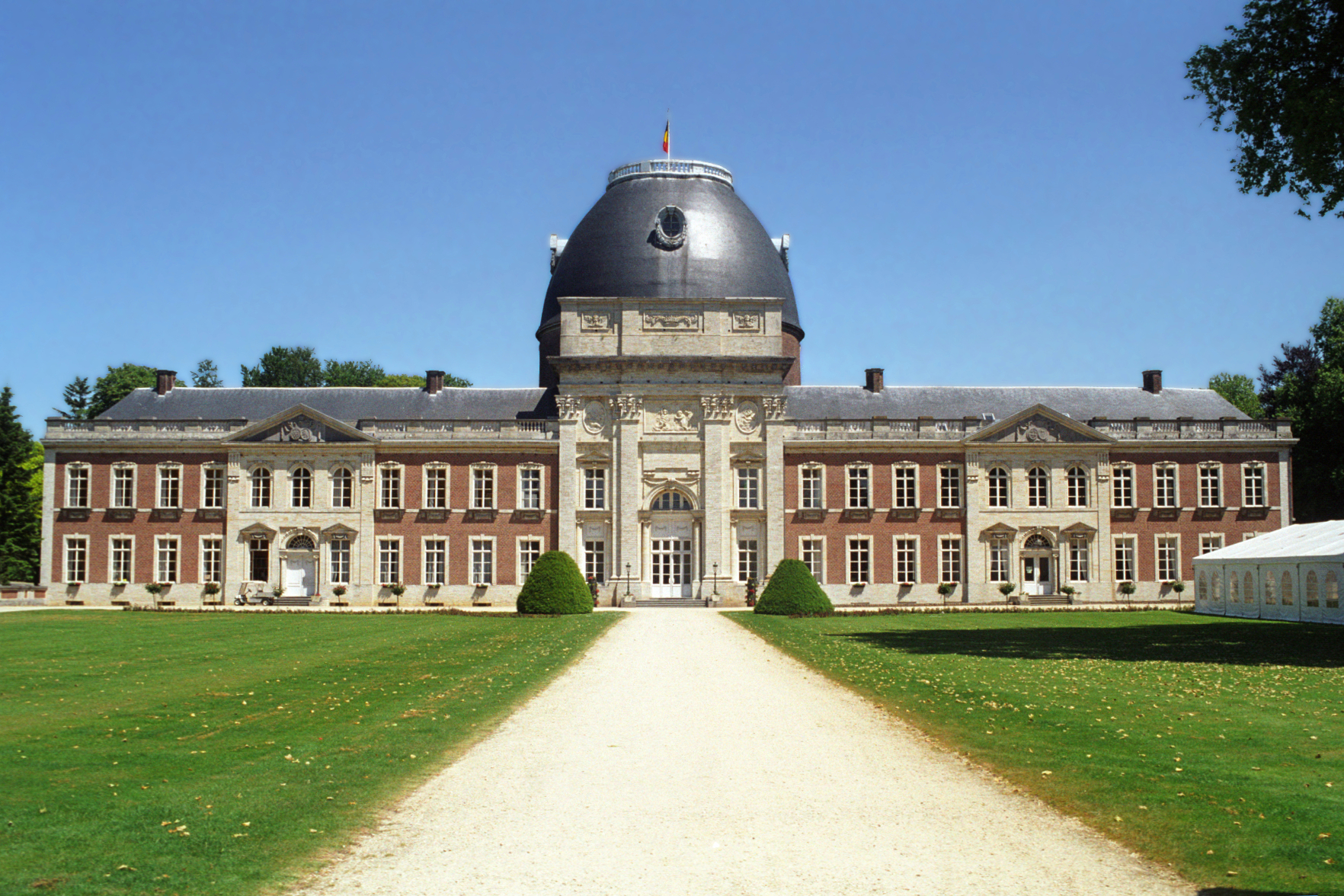
Principal façade

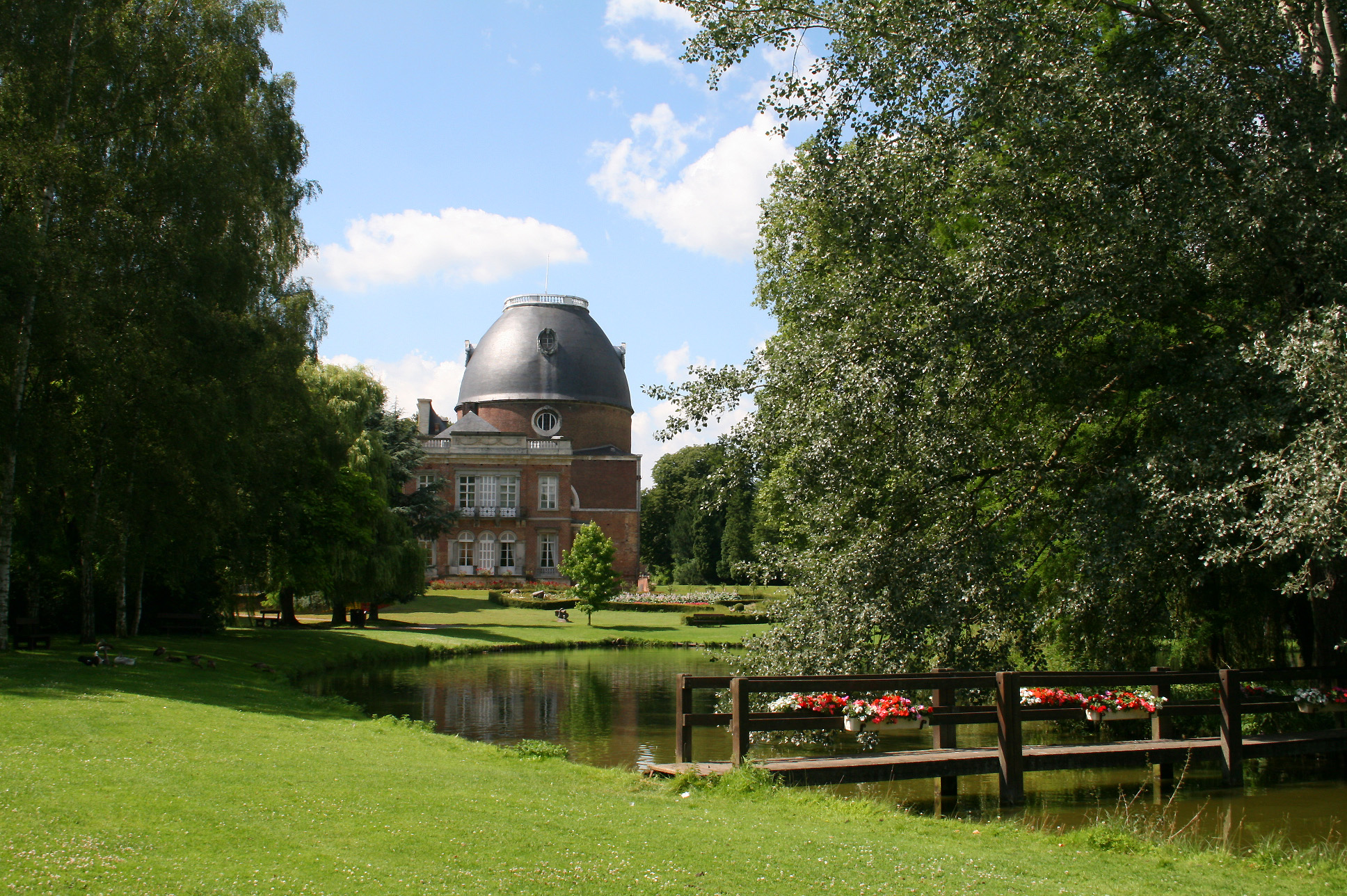
The house from across the park

Hélécine Castle (French: Château d'Hélécine) is a large residence in Opheylissem in the municipality of Hélécine, Walloon Brabant, Wallonia, Belgium.

The present building represents the remains of the former Premonstratensian Opheylissem Abbey, which was dissolved in 1796. Most of the buildings were destroyed, but the abbot's house (prelatuur) remained, and in 1870 was restructured by the architect Alphonse Balat in its present form. Balat laid out the surrounding park at the same time.

The house and park were acquired by the Province of Brabant, and after 1995 became that of the Province of Walloon Brabant.

== See also ==
- List of castles in Belgium
