= Hélécine =

Municipality in Walloon Brabant province, Wallonia, Belgium

- Municipality
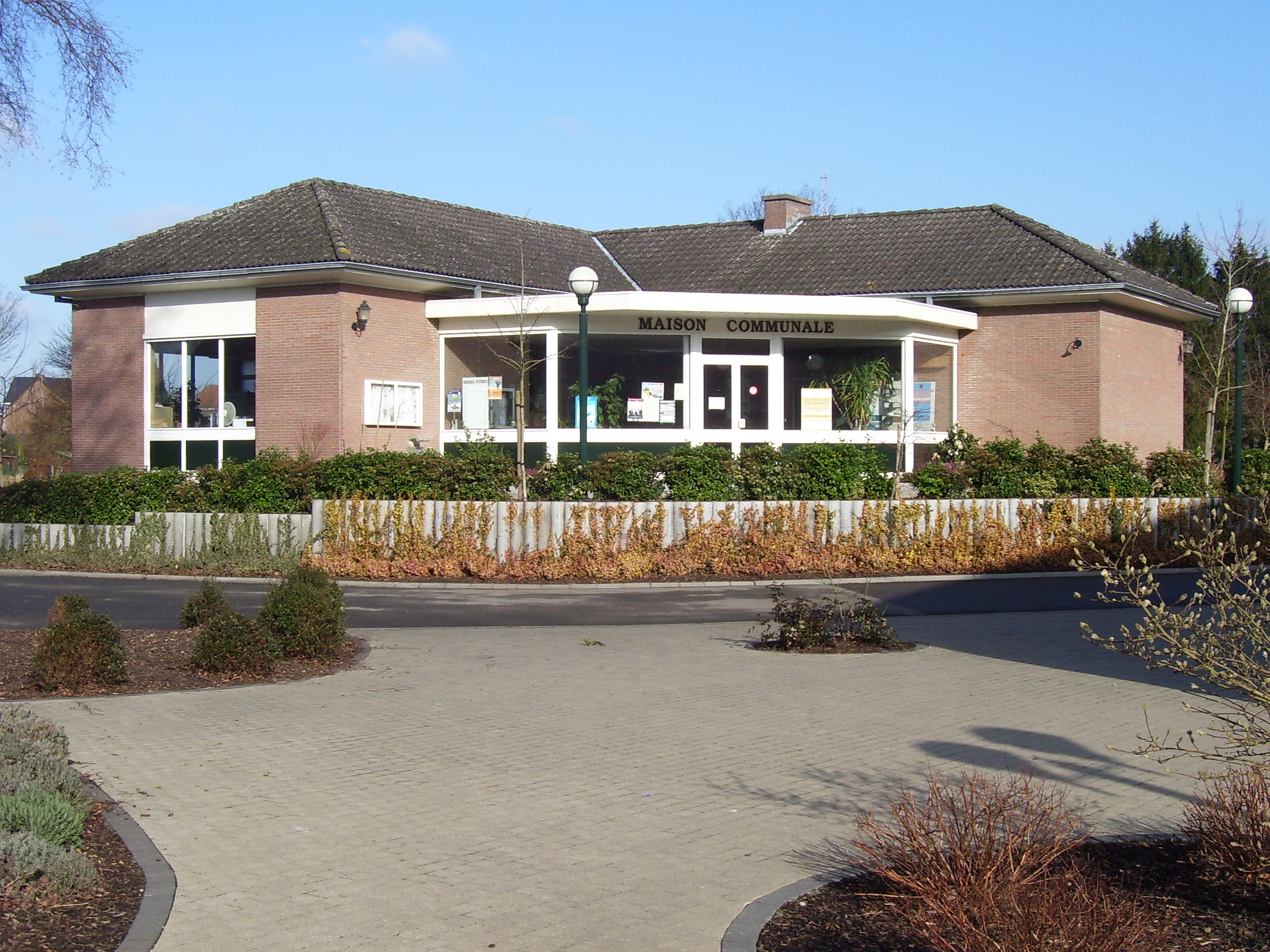
- Town hall

- Flag Coat of arms

- The municipality of Hélécine in Walloon Brabant
- Interactive map of Hélécine
- Location in Belgium
- Coordinates: 50°45′N 04°59′E
- Country: Belgium
- Community: French Community
- Region: Wallonia
- Province: Walloon Brabant
- Arrondissement: Nivelles

Government
  - Mayor: Pascal Collin (MR)
  - Governing party: U.C.

Area
  - Total: 16.98 km^{2} (6.56 sq mi)

Population (2026-01-01)
  - Total: 3,926
  - Density: 231.2/km^{2} (598.8/sq mi)
- Postal codes: 1357
- NIS code: 25118
- Area codes: 019
- Website: www.helecine.be

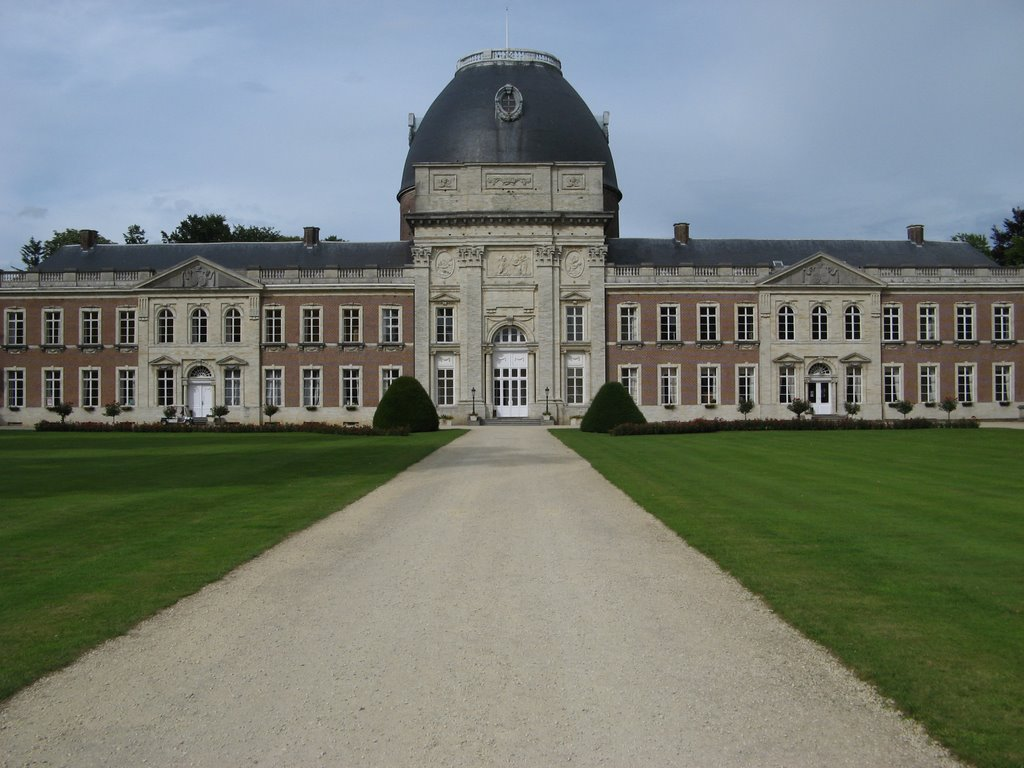
Opheylissem Castle, formerly a Premonstratensian abbey

Hélécine (French pronunciation: [elesin]; Walloon: Élessene; Dutch: Heylissem / Heilissem, pronounced [ˈɦɛilɪsəm]) is a municipality of Wallonia located in the Belgian province of Walloon Brabant. It has a total area is 16.98 km^{2} with a census population of 3,648 on January 1, 2021, and a estimated population of 3,926 on January 1, 2026, giving it a population density of 231.2 inhabitants per km^{2}.

The municipality consists of the following districts: Linsmeau, Neerheylissem, and Opheylissem.

== Name origin ==
Hélécine is of Germanic origin that means "dwelling of Hailo people".

== Geography ==
The municipality comprises three villages: Linsmeau, Neerheylissem, and Opheylissem, and the hamlet of Hamme. Further to the north is the Neerheylissem village which also contain the town hall. To the south is Opheylissem, and in the southeast is Linsmeel and Hamme.

== See also ==
- List of protected heritage sites in Hélécine
