= Auguste Payen =

Belgian architect

Auguste Payen (1801–1877) was a Belgian architect whose work included civic buildings in Brussels and railway stations for the Belgian State Railways.

== Life ==
Payen was born in Brussels on 7 June 1801. His father, of the same name, was also an architect, originally from Tournai. Payen studied under Bruno Renard at the drawing academy in Tournai. There he was imbued with the idea that only the Greeks and Romans provided models for architecture. He remained loyal to this Belgian Neo-Classicism throughout his career, even as Gothic Revival architecture came into fashion. Between 1830 and 1841 he worked as city architect for Brussels, resigning to take up a position with the Belgian State Railways. His work on rail infrastructure included the original Brussels-South railway station. He died in Saint-Josse-ten-Noode on 16 April 1877.

== Honours ==
- Knight of the Order of Leopold, 1848.
- Officer of the Order of Leopold, 1871.
