= John Cockerill (industrialist) =

English-Belgian industrialist (1790–1840)

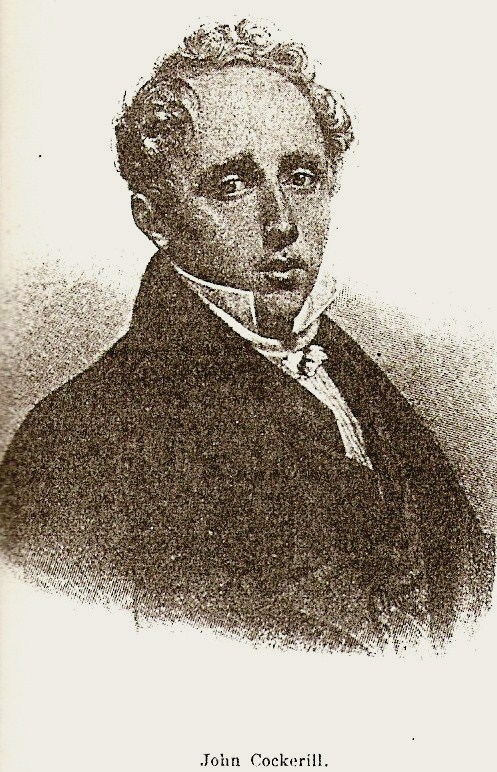
- Born: 3 August 1790; Haslingden, Lancashire, Great Britain
- Died: 9 June 1840 (aged 49); Warsaw, Congress Poland
- Citizenship: British, later Belgian
- Occupation: Industrialist

John Cockerill (3 August 1790 – 9 June 1840) was an English-born industrialist who became a prominent businessman in Belgium. Born at Haslingden, Lancashire, England, he was brought by his father (British entrepreneur William Cockerill) to the Liège region, where he continued the family tradition of building wool-processing machinery. He founded an ironworks named John Cockerill & Cie. (English: John Cockerill & Company).

== Life and career ==
At the age of twelve, John Cockerill was brought to Verviers (subsequently part of Belgium) by his father William Cockerill, who was successful as a machine builder there. In 1807, aged 17, he and his brother Charles James Cockerill took over the management of a factory in Liege. Their father retired in 1813, leaving the management of his business to his sons.

In September 1813, he married Jeanne Frédérique Pastor, the same day her sister Caroline married Charles James Cockerill.

After the victory over Napoleon at the Battle of Waterloo in 1815, the Prussian Minister of Finance, Peter Beuth, invited the Cockerill brothers to set up a woollens factory in Berlin.

In 1814, the brothers bought the former château of the Prince Bishops of Liege at Seraing. The chateau became the plant headquarters and the ground behind it the factory site (founded 1817); it was to become a vertically integrated iron foundry and machine manufacturing factory. William I of the Netherlands was joint owner of the plant. A machine manufacturing plant was added in 1819, and in 1826 (begun 1823) a coke fired blast furnace. By 1840, the plant had sixteen steam engines producing total power 900 hp (670 kW) in continual work and employed 3000 persons.

In 1823, his brother Charles James retired, having been bought out by John in 1822. After the Belgian Revolution of 1830, the new Kingdom of Belgium claimed the property of William I, and in 1835, John Cockerill made himself the sole owner of the works. He also was a founder of the Banque de Belgique, in 1835.

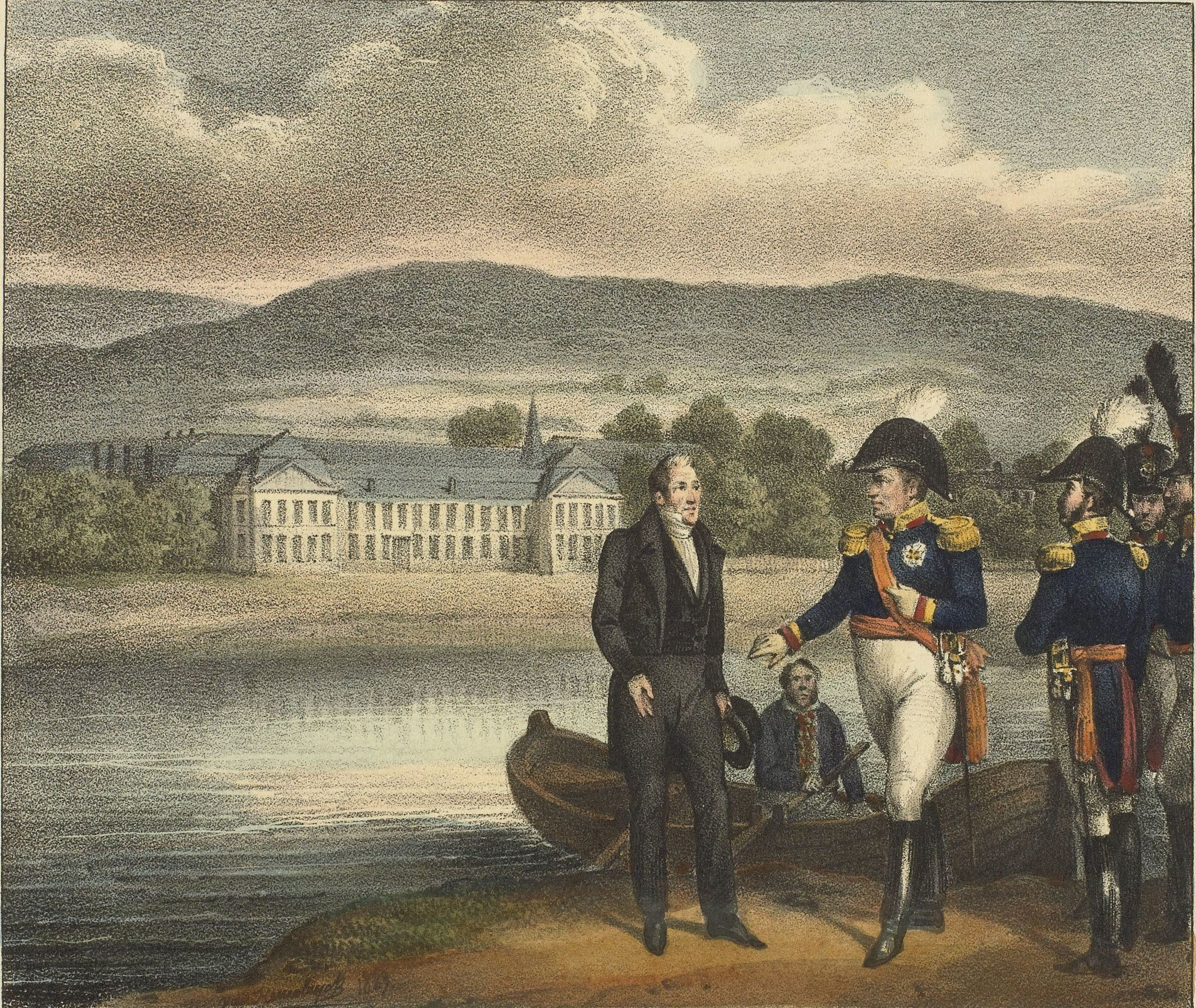
King William I pictured with Cockerill in 1829 in Les Rencontres historiques (1829-30). The caption reads: "Continue without fear your great enterprises and remember that the King of the Netherlands always has money at the service of industry." The Château de Seraing, owned by the Cockerills, is in the background.

During John Cockerill's lifetime, the factories produced not only spinning engines and steel, but steam engines (including air-blowers, traction engines, and engines for ships); in 1835, Belgium's first steam locomotive Le Belge was made. He also had interests in collieries and mines, as well as factories producing cloth, linen and paper.

In 1838/9, military tensions between Belgium and the Netherlands caused a rush on the banks for hard currency; as a result of the crisis, John Cockerill's company became bankrupt. With debts of 26 million francs on assets of 15 million, he travelled to St. Petersburg to make arrangements with Nicholas I of Russia, with the hope of raising funds. On his return, he contracted typhoid and died in Warsaw on 19 June 1840, leaving no heirs.

== Legacy ==
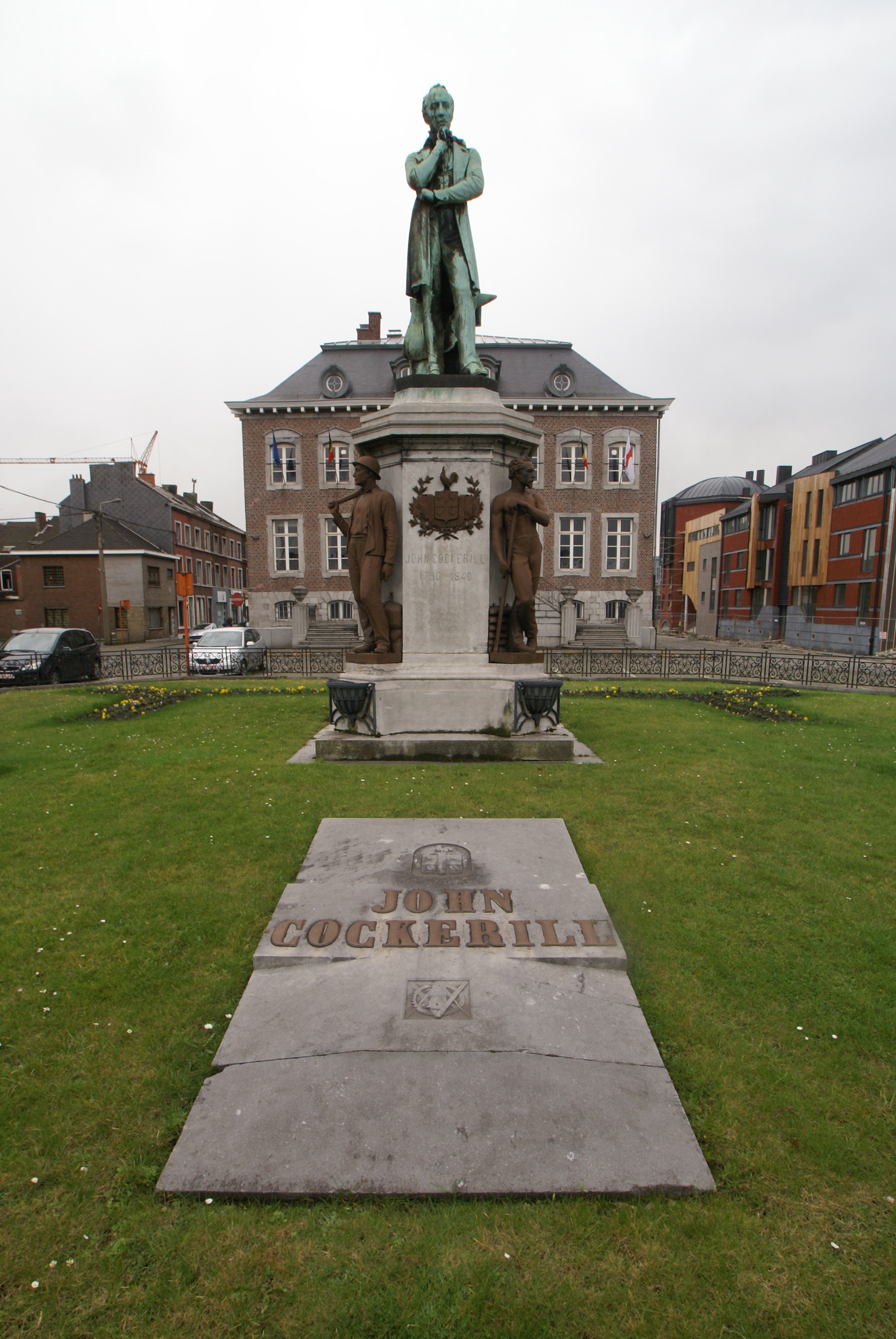
Statue and tombstone of John Cockerill in front of the town hall in Seraing

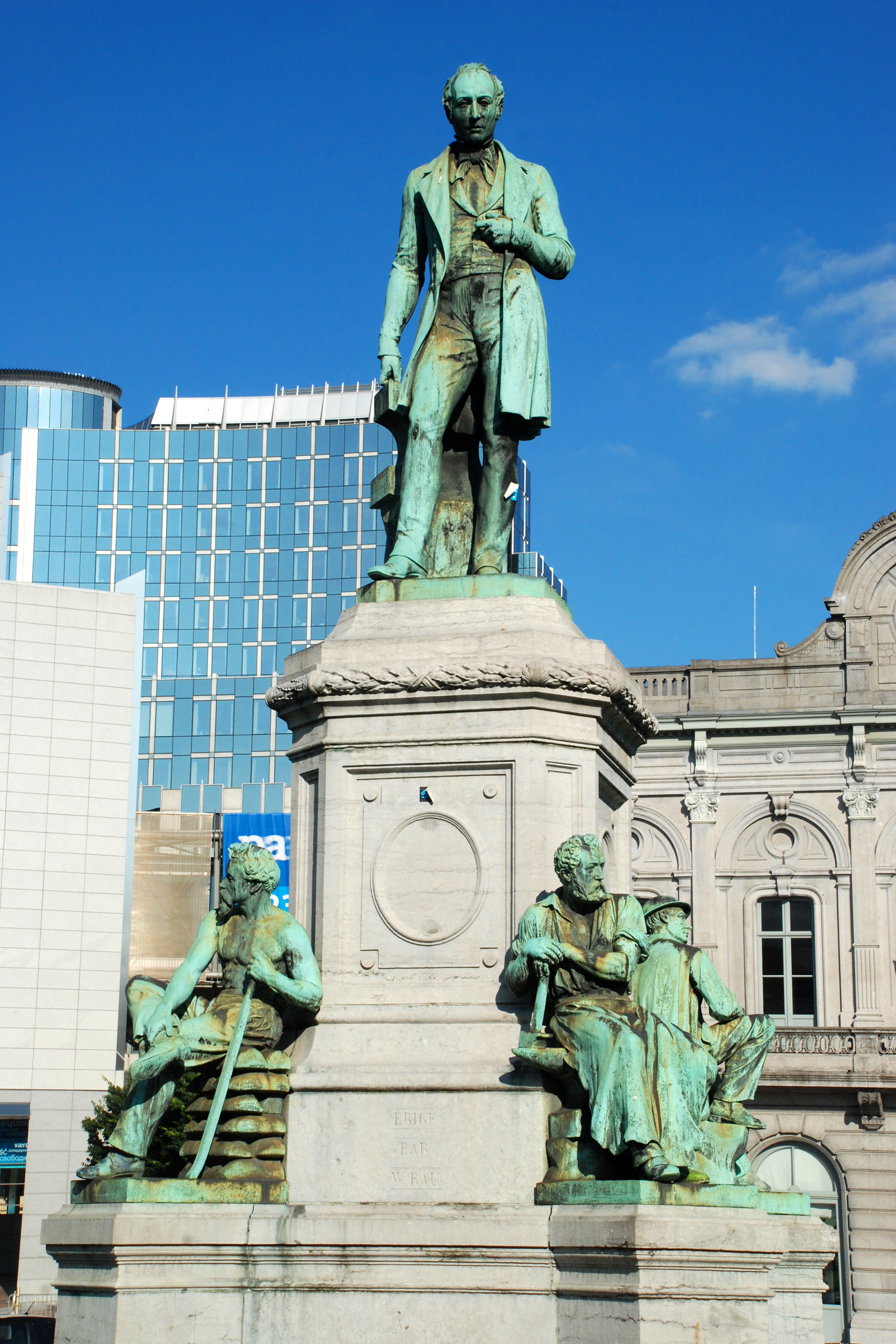
Monument to John Cockerill on the Place du Luxembourg/Luxemburgplein in Brussels

On his death, he had a reputation as a humanitarian employer and as the founder of the Belgian manufacturing industry. His body was returned to Seraing in 1867, and a memorial was unveiled there in 1871.

His company became the Société pour l'Exploitation des Etablissements John Cockerill (1842) and later Societe Anonyme Cockerill-Ougree (1955). The steel-making activities of the firm continued through various mergers, eventually becoming part of Cockerill-Sambre in 1981; the Cockerill name was retained until a 1998 merger with Usinor. Some mechanical engineering activities continued as Cockerill Maintenance & Ingénierie, which was split off as a separate company in the late 20th century.

A monument to him and the industrial workers of Belgium stands in the centre of the Place du Luxembourg/Luxemburgplein in Brussels. On 1 February 2024, this monument was vandalised during a farmers' protest that took place in front of the European Parliament.

== Honours ==
- Knight of the Order of Leopold.
