= Church of St. Joseph, Brussels =

Church in Brussels, Belgium

Church of St. Joseph
- Église Saint-Joseph (French); Sint-Jozefkerk (Dutch)
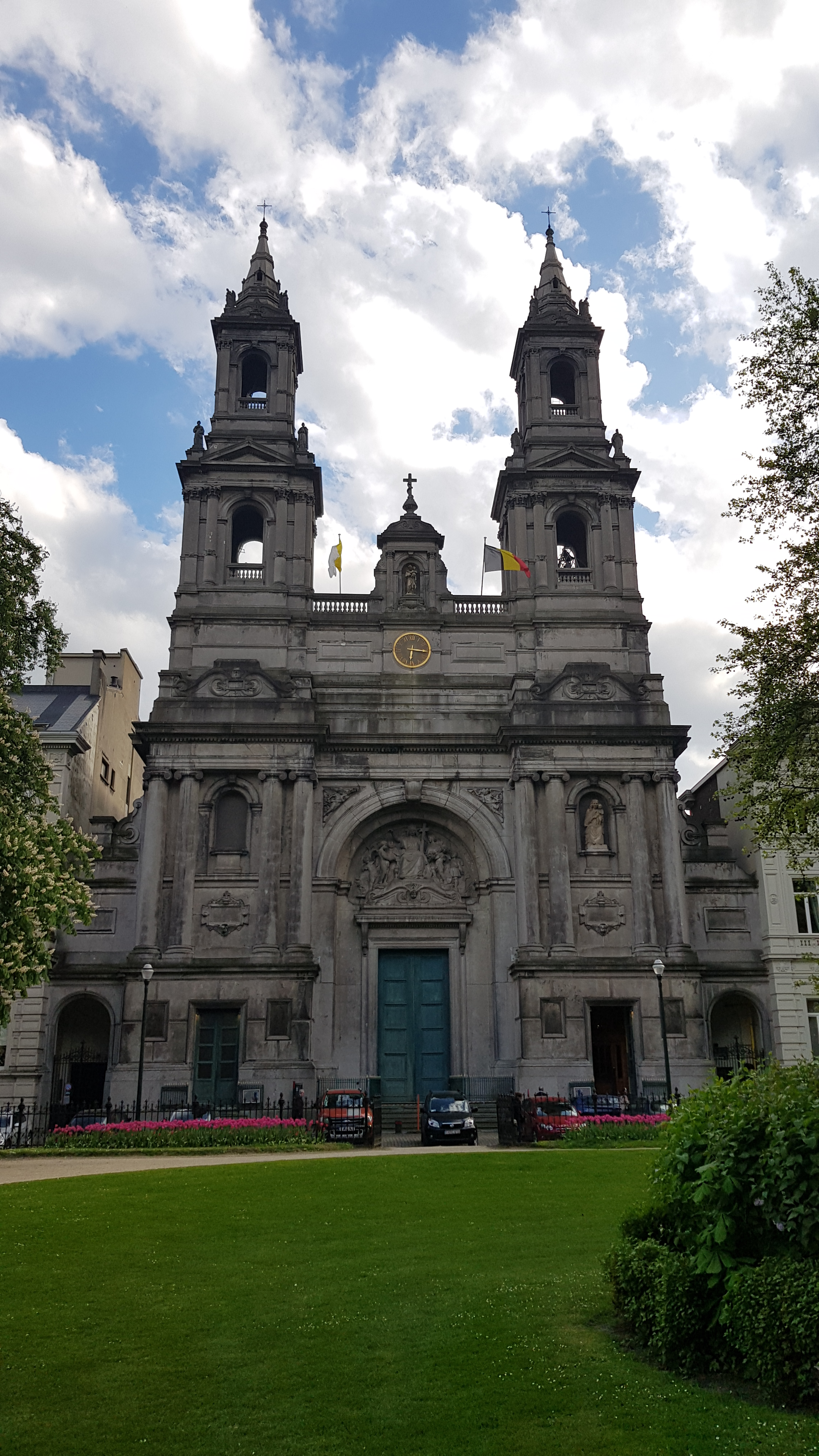
- Church of St. Joseph
- 50°50′34″N 4°22′15″E
- Location: Square Frère Orban / Frère-Orbansquare; 1000 City of Brussels, Brussels-Capital Region
- Country: Belgium
- Denomination: Society of St. Pius X

History
- Dedication: Saint Joseph (patron saint of Belgium)

Architecture
- Functional status: Active
- Heritage designation: Protected
- Designated: 13/05/1981
- Architect: Tilman-François Suys
- Architectural type: Church
- Groundbreaking: 1842
- Completed: 1849

The Church of St. Joseph (French: Église Saint-Joseph; Dutch: Sint-Jozefkerk) is a church of the Society of St Pius X situated on the Square Frère Orban/Frère-Orbansquare in the Leopold Quarter of Brussels, Belgium. Built between 1842 and 1849 in eclectic style, it is a national sanctuary dedicated to Saint Joseph, who has been the patron saint of Belgium and its predecessor states since 1679.

== History ==
Inspired by the church of Trinità dei Monti in Rome, the architect Tilman-François Suys decided to create a church resembling one of Rome's many basilicas with a flat apse choir. The first stone of the building was laid by Cardinal Engelbert Sterckx on 6 April 1842. The Apostolic Nuncio, Cardinal Giacomo Cattani, consecrated the church on 24 June 1874 and also made it the National Shrine of Saint Joseph.

The church was occupied by the Redemptorists for many decades until it was looked after by the Syriac Orthodox from 1989 to 2001. It was then acquired by the Priory of Christ the King of the Society of St. Pius X, offering a much needed place of worship for their rapidly growing number of parishioners.

The building received protected status through a royal decree issued on 13 May 1981.

== Description ==
The church has three naves measuring a total of 66 metres (217 ft) in length and 26 metres (85 ft) in width. Its vault is 18 metres (59 ft) high and is supported by two rows of Corinthian columns that separate the two aisles of the main church.

== See also ==
- List of churches in Brussels
- Catholic Church in Belgium
- History of Brussels
- Belgium in the long nineteenth century
