= Leopold Quarter =

Neighbourhood in Brussels, Belgium

Leopold Quarter: Quartier Léopold (French); Leopoldswijk (Dutch)
- Neighbourhood
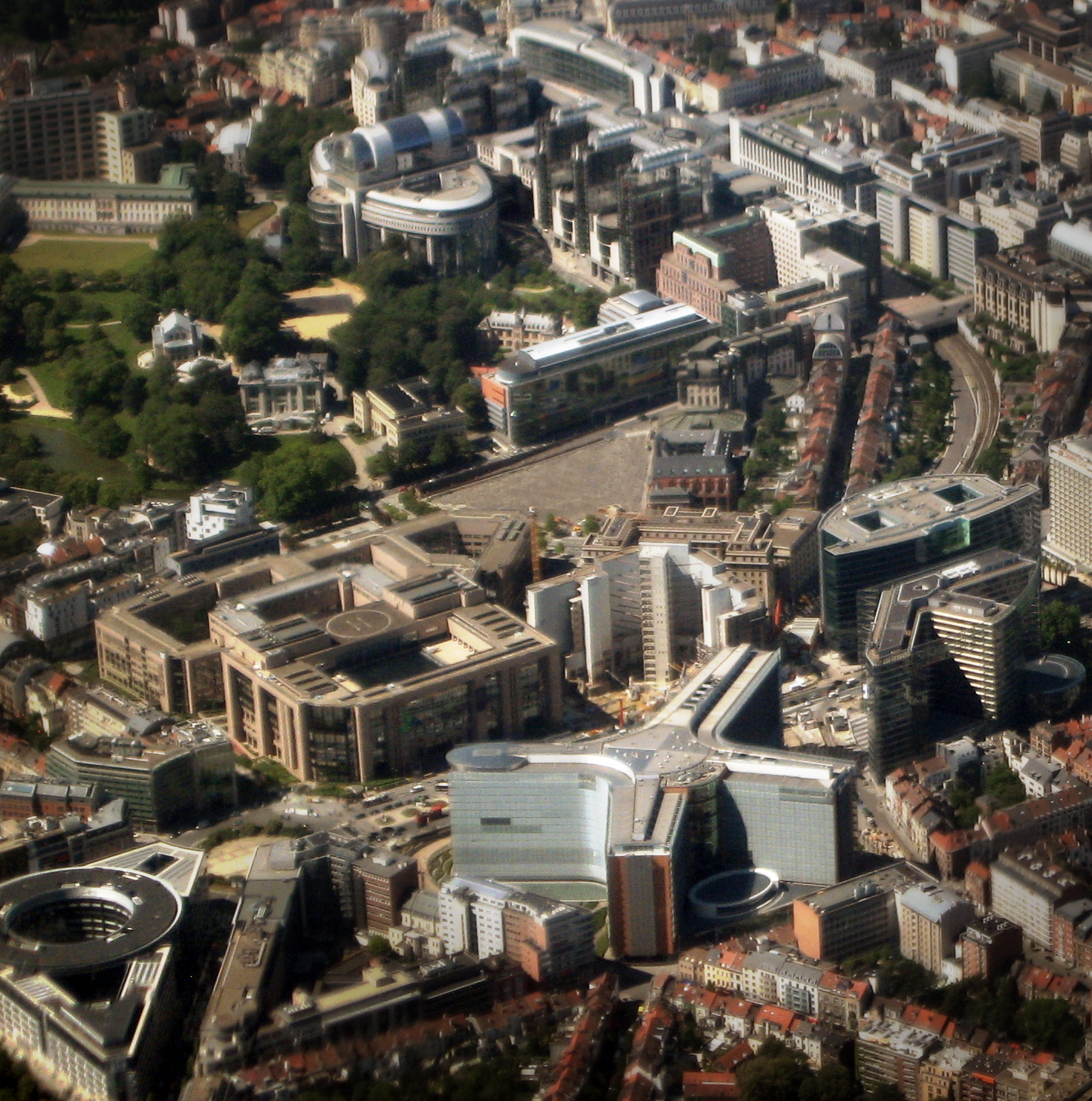
- Aerial view of the European Quarter (including parts of the Leopold Quarter)

- Location within Brussels Leopold Quarter (Belgium)
- Coordinates: 50°50′20″N 4°22′12″E
- Country: Belgium
- Region: Brussels-Capital Region
- Arrondissement: Brussels-Capital
- Municipality: City of Brussels; Etterbeek; Ixelles; Saint-Josse-ten-Noode
- Named for: King Leopold I
- Time zone: UTC+1 (CET)
  - Summer (DST): UTC+2 (CEST)
- Postal code: 1000, 1040, 1050, 1210
- Area codes: 02

The Leopold Quarter (French: Quartier Léopold, pronounced [kaʁtje leɔpɔl(d)]; Dutch: Leopoldswijk, pronounced [ˈleːjoːpɔltsˌʋɛik]) is a quarter of Brussels, Belgium. The term is sometimes confused with the European Quarter, as the area has come to be dominated by the institutions of the European Union (EU) and related organisations, although the two terms are not in fact the same, with the Leopold Quarter being a smaller more specific district of the municipalities of the City of Brussels, Etterbeek, Ixelles and Saint-Josse-ten-Noode.

The Leopold Quarter traditionally encompassed the area immediately south of the Small Ring (Brussels' inner ring road), between the Namur Gate and the Leuven Gate. Nowadays, it lies roughly between the ring road, Leopold Park, the Rue Joseph II/Jozef II-Straat, and the Rue du Trône/Troonstraat. The district was created in 1837, soon after Belgian independence, as a prestigious residential area for the elite of the new Belgian capital, and was named after King Leopold I. It remained a favoured address in the capital until the early 20th century, when many of its former residents began to relocate to the city's newly developing suburbs. Starting at that time, but accelerating rapidly only after the 1950s, it increasingly became a business/institutional area and is now dominated by the EU's facilities.

The quarter contains the European Parliament (with its complex of parliament buildings known as the Espace Léopold) and other EU offices. It is also a major financial district of Brussels. Brussels-Luxembourg railway station was formerly known as Leopold Quarter railway station before undergoing major rebuilding.

== History ==
=== Construction ===
The area south-east of the second walls of Brussels was largely rural until the 19th century. In the last years of Austrian rule, plans were mooted to build a new residential district outside of the crowded city walls, in the area that would become the Leopold Quarter. When the walls were torn down in the wake of the Napoleonic Wars, a plan was adopted to transform the area formerly occupied by the walls into a series of boulevards bounding the historical city centre. These boulevards still exist today and form Brussels' Small Ring.

At the country's independence in 1830, the new members of the Belgian upper class hoped to create a new prestigious residential area in the capital. An official plan for the quarter was drawn up in 1838 by the architect Tilman-François Suys. The area was designed to emanate from Brussels Park (located in front of the Royal Palace), and was laid out on a grid in a traditional classical pattern centred around the Square Frère Orban/Frère-Orbansquare. The Leopold Quarter was quickly developed and already counted 500 residents by 1847. By 1853, the population had reached 3,212, mostly property owners or landed gentry with domestic staff. Other typical residents included civil servants, military officers, members of liberal professions, embassy staff, and representatives of foreign companies.

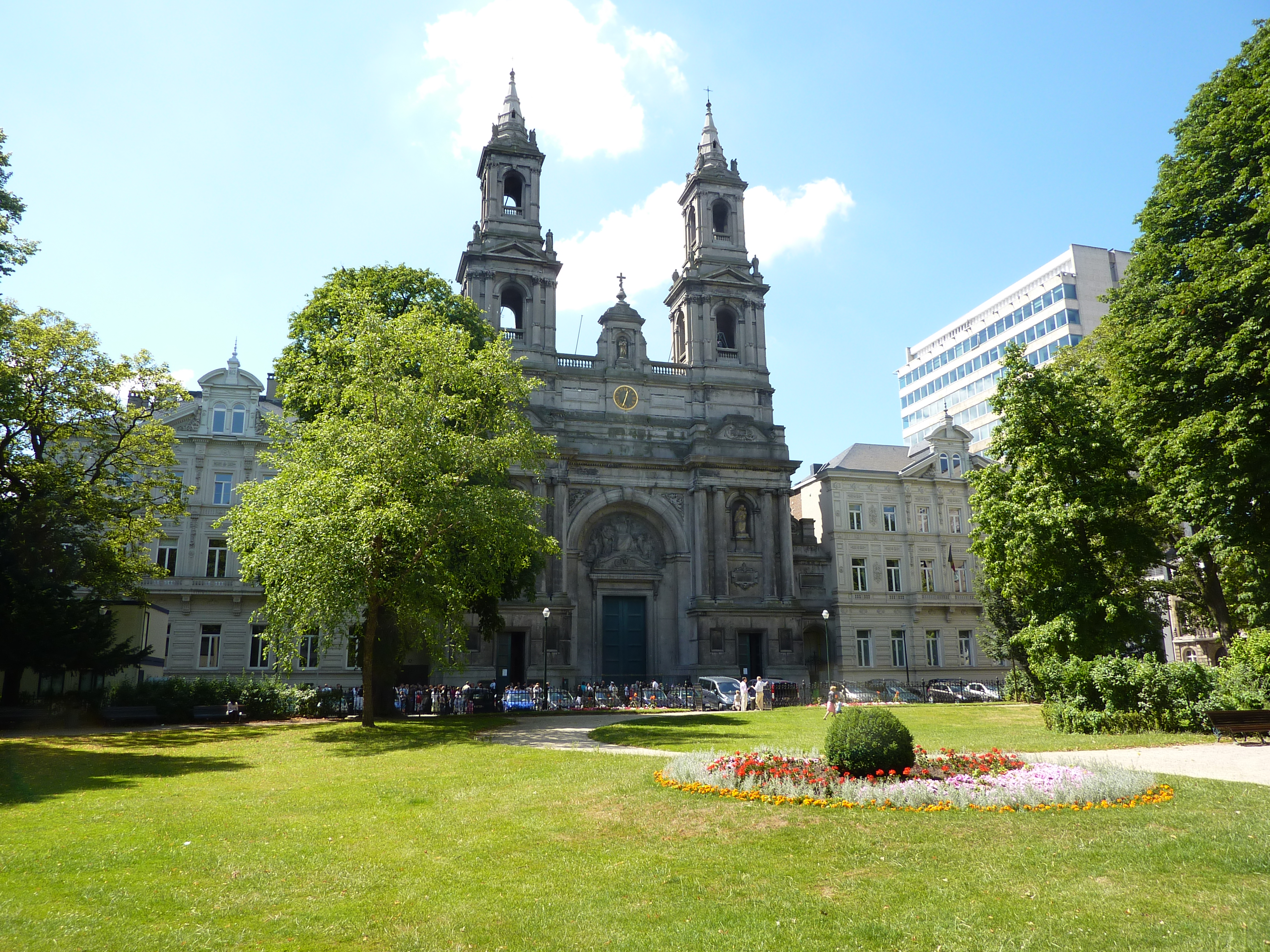
The Square Frère Orban/Frère-Orbansquare with the Church of St. Joseph

A railway station called Leopold Quarter railway station was built in 1854–55, along with a large square at the end of the Rue de Luxembourg/Luxemburgstraat. The station is known today as Brussels-Luxembourg railway station, while the square is still known as the Place du Luxembourg/Luxemburgplein. They had not been included in Suys' original plans, as the railroad was a new development in the 1830s in Belgium. Designed by the architect Gustave Saintenoy, the station and the railway came to be a defining feature of the area's geography. In those days, the outer edge of the area was bounded by the Maelbeek valley, but in the 1850s, plans were drawn up to build a bridge across it to connect the Rue de la Loi/Wetstraat to the new military parade ground on the Linthout Plateau (today's Parc du Cinquantenaire/Jubelpark).

The Eggevoorde Estate had dominated the Maelbeek valley since the Middle Ages, but portions had been sold off in the following centuries. In 1851, a portion of the estate was sold off in exchange for shares in the Zoological and Horticultural Society, and the area became what is today Leopold Park. The park was intended to be a venue for scientific and leisure activities. Horticultural gardens and a zoo were created along with a community hall, a reading room, and a café-restaurant. However, the zoo was poorly managed and the management company went bankrupt in 1876. The horticultural gardens, on the other hand, were quite successfully managed by Jean Jules Linden, and they became a commercial and scientific success story until his death in 1898. The City of Brussels bought the old zoological gardens in 1908 and converted them into a public recreational park containing a variety of attractions, including the current Museum of Natural Sciences.

In 1884, Ernest Solvay and Paul Heger, professors at the Université libre de Bruxelles (ULB), began a project to create an expanded university campus in the park. Several of the university's new institutes were established there, and still stand today, including the original site of the Solvay Institute of Sociology, as well as its sister institution, the Solvay Institute of Physiology, which was completed in 1894. It was in that building that the famous fifth Solvay Conference on Physics and on Chemistry took place in October 1927.

=== 20th and 21st centuries ===
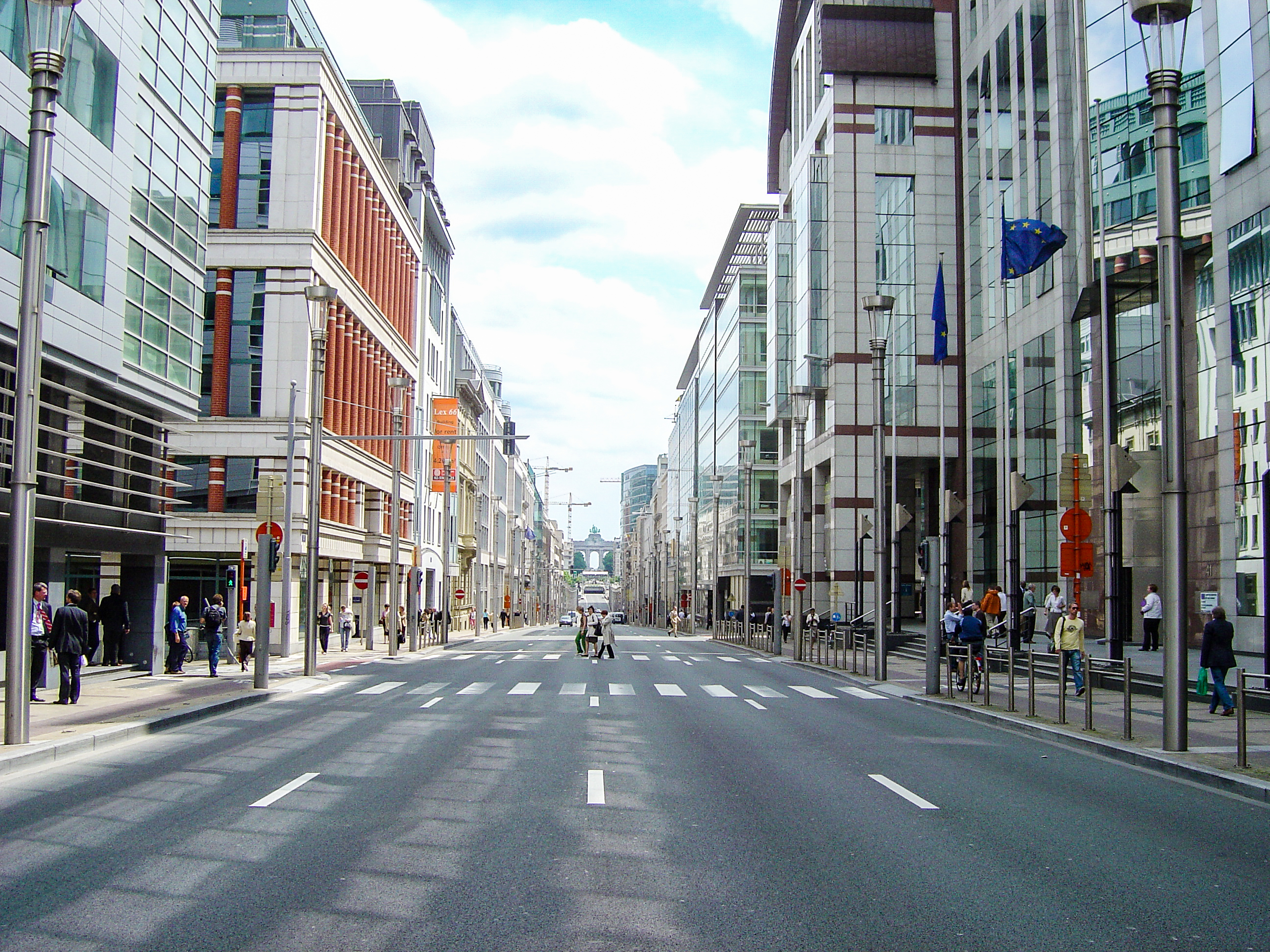
The area is dominated by medium-rise office blocks dating from the late 20th and early 21st centuries.

The population of the area peaked around 1900. By 1930, the population had declined by 30%. Railway connections, and then the rise in car ownership, allowed the wealthy residents to live further from the city in more open suburbs. The increasingly old fashioned mansions in the area, which were generally designed for use by families with the help of domestic servants, became increasingly difficult to maintain. Property developers started building apartments in the area in the 1920s and increasingly in the 1930s, initiating a gradual change in its architectural character. Slowly at first, companies began purchasing unused mansions and adapting them to their use. Then after the Second World War, several insurance companies and colonial organisations began a trend toward demolishing the 19th-century mansions and town houses, and replacing them with new modern office blocks.

With changes to the road infrastructure of the Small Ring for the 1958 Brussels World's Fair (Expo 58), the area became even more attractive to companies, being located between Brussels' administrative centre and the residential suburbs further out. With the growing economy, and then the arrival of the first European institutions in the late 1950s, the area became a major target for property developers when building office space for institutional and corporate use. Brussels had no development plan, and did not enforce existing legal restrictions, so most remaining residents left during this time as it had become completely transformed from a formerly quiet residential area into a congested centre of transport and business.

In 1987, the old Leopold brewery was torn down in anticipation of the construction of what would become the Espace Léopold, which was unofficially intended to house the European Parliament. Political and legal wrangling had continually delayed a final conclusion regarding the unofficial seat for the Parliament. However, as Brussels hoped to keep all of the official institutions in the city, provision was made for the construction of a suitable facility (see Brussels and the European Union). The construction of the massive facility changed the face of the district again, putting the above ground railway tracks of the Leopold Quarter railway station below ground and renaming it as Brussels-Luxembourg railway station.

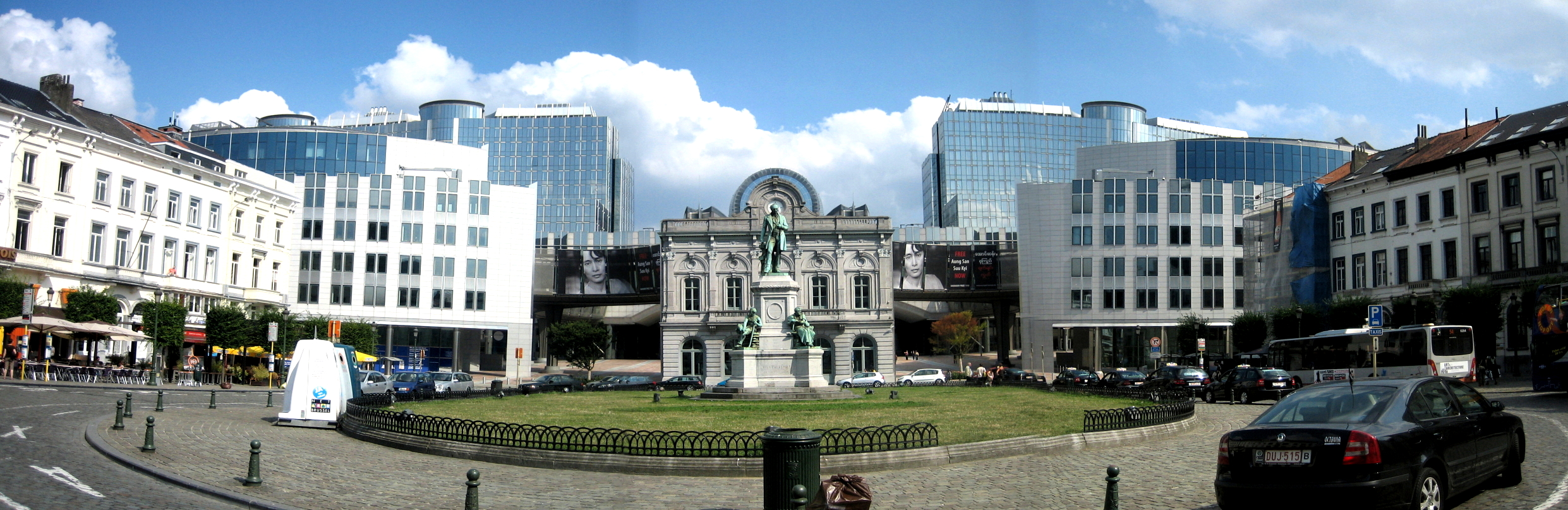
The Place du Luxembourg/Luxemburgplein, with what remains of the old Luxembourg Station building centre, and the European Parliament behind. The Place du Luxembourg retains some of the more traditional architectural elements, while the parliamentary complex dominates the now largely institutional area.

== See also ==
- Neighbourhoods in Brussels
- Neoclassical architecture in Belgium
- Institutional seats of the European Union
- Brusselisation
- History of Brussels
- Belgium in the long nineteenth century
