= Place du Luxembourg =

Square in Brussels, Belgium

Place du Luxembourg (French); Luxemburgplein (Dutch)
- Place Lux / Plux
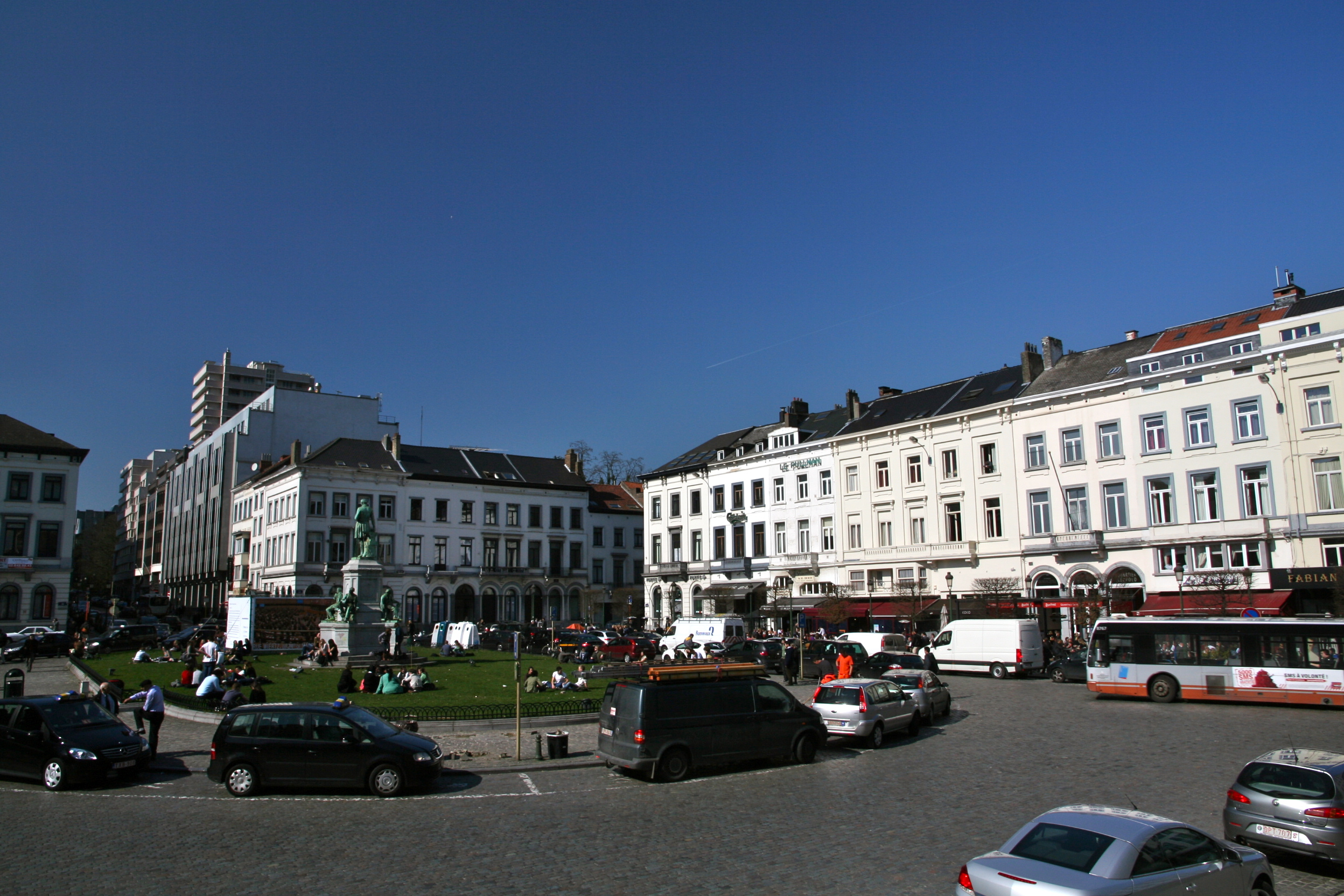
- The Place du Luxembourg/Luxemburgplein, view facing toward town, away from the European Parliament

- Location within Brussels Location within Belgium
- Type: Square
- Location: Ixelles and City of Brussels, Brussels-Capital Region, Belgium
- Quarter: Leopold Quarter
- Postal code: 1050
- Nearest metro station: 1 5 Schuman and 2 6 Trône/Troon
- Coordinates: 50°50′21″N 04°22′21″E

Construction
- Completion: c. 1861

The Place du Luxembourg (French, pronounced [plas dy lyk.sɑ̃.buʁ]) or Luxemburgplein (Dutch, pronounced [ˈlʏksəmbʏrɡˌplɛin]), meaning "Luxembourg Square", is a square in the European Quarter of Brussels, Belgium. It is better known by local European bureaucrats and journalists by one of its nicknames, Place Lux or Plux.

The square is mostly located in the municipality of Ixelles, with a small part in the City of Brussels, between the Rue d'Arlon/Aarlenstraat and the Rue du Luxembourg/Luxemburgstraat. In its centre stands the Monument to John Cockerill. It is also flanked by the European Parliament, as well as some of the main European institutions in the city. This area is served by Brussels-Luxembourg railway station, as well as by the metro stations Schuman (on lines 1 and 5) and Trône/Troon (on lines 2 and 6).

== History ==
=== Early history ===
The Place du Luxembourg/Luxemburgplein was a central feature of the Leopold Quarter, a neighbourhood developed in the first few decades after the Belgian Revolution, and the most prestigious residential area in the capital for the bulk of the 19th century. The district had been designed in 1838 by the architect Tilman-Francois Suys, but the original design did not include provisions for a train station.

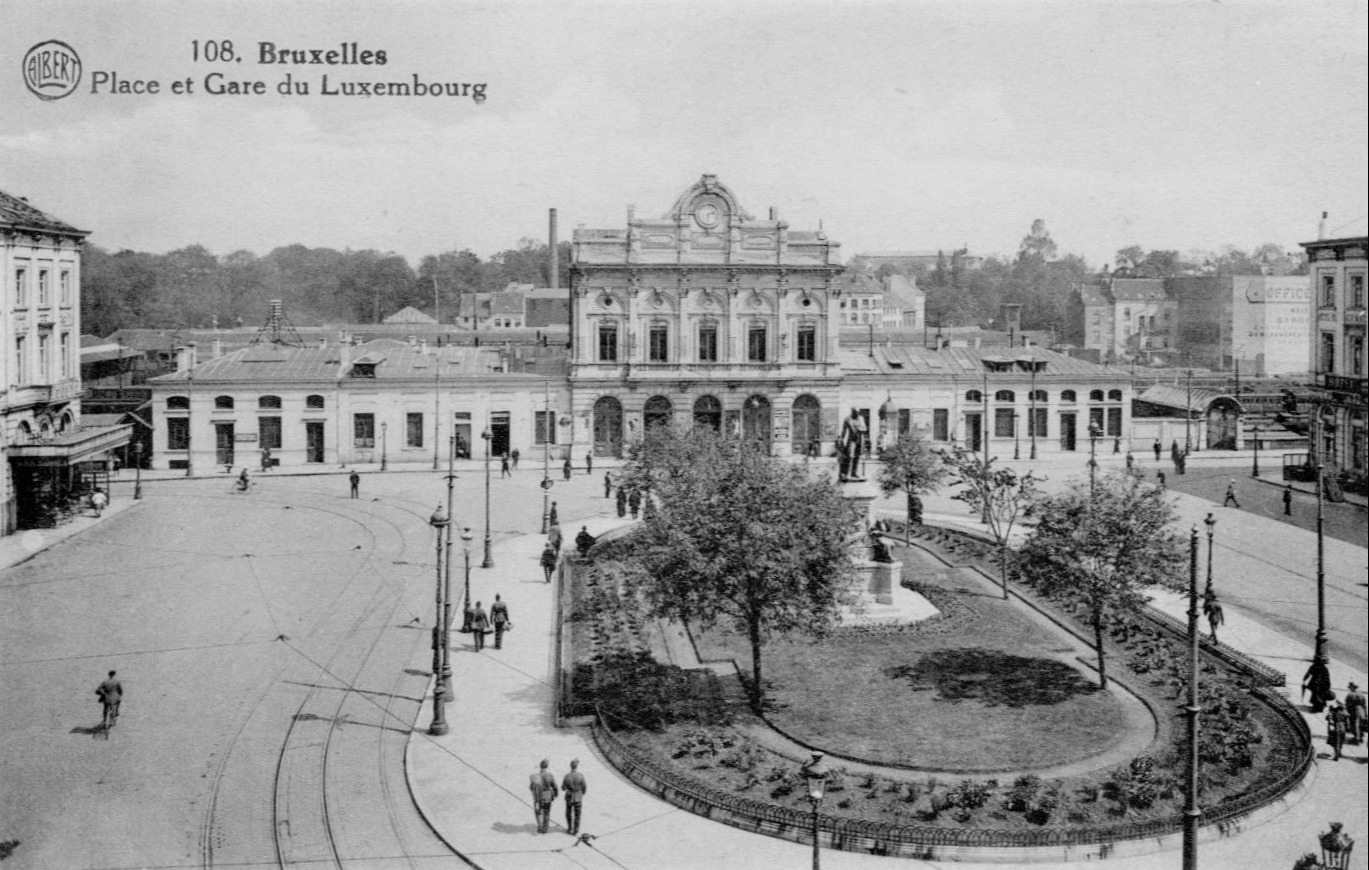
The Place du Luxembourg in the early 20th century

When the new Leopold Quarter railway station was built in 1854–55, the architect Antoine Trappeniers was commissioned to draw up plans for a large public square leading to the station. The Rue de Luxembourg/Luxemburgstraat was then in an embryonic state, and the square was created as its end point. The square was designed in a neoclassical style and to be as symmetrical as possible. Construction was carried out primarily between 1855 and 1861. Due to its proximity to the station, the square was popular among merchants, as well as restaurant and café owners. One house on the corner of the Rue d'Arlon/Aarlenstraat was, at one time, the home of Auguste Beernaert, prime minister from 1884 to 1894.

During the 19th century, the station was divided into sections to differentiate the three different classes of travel. The station was extended in 1899 and 1921 with single storey pavilions, which were then amalgamated in 1934, when the façade was standardised.

=== 1980s to present ===
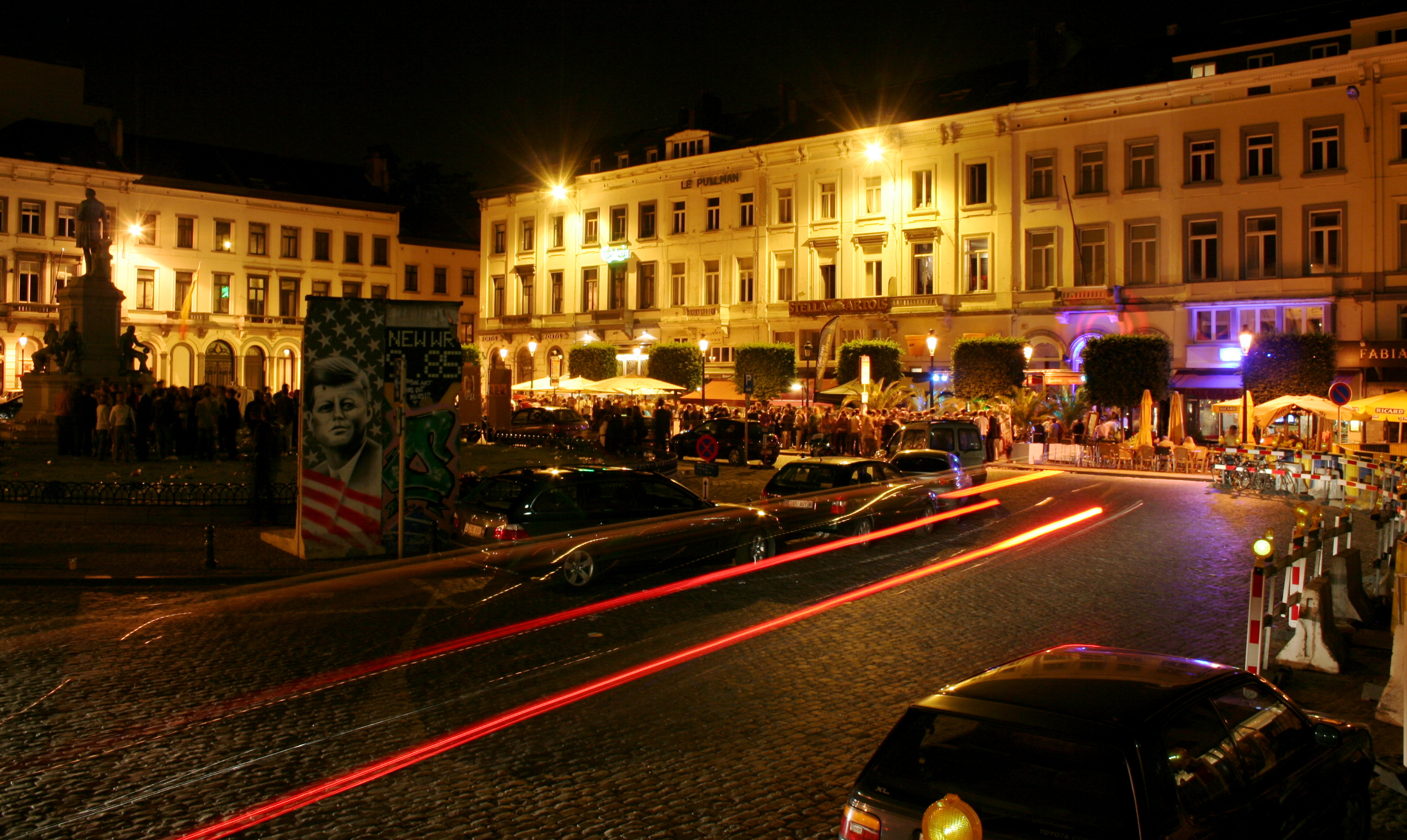
The Place du Luxembourg is a popular after-work meeting place in Brussels' European Quarter.

The station was the square's central feature for much of its existence. However, with the construction of the Espace Léopold (which now houses the European Parliament) starting in 1989, the square's character changed significantly. Designs changed frequently, amidst much legal and political wrangling, but ultimately the tracks of the previously open air station were covered over by the flagstone mall that is now seen outside the European Parliament. The bulk of the station building itself was torn down in 2004, and rebuilt underground, leaving only the central entrance, which now serves as an information office. By 2008, the parliamentary complex was complete.

Residents' associations and cultural heritage promoters have been critical of many aspects of the European Parliament's construction and the train station's redesign. Some believe that the scale of the complex is simply too large for the area and that efforts have not been adequate to integrate it with its largely neoclassical surroundings. While many have praised the originality and professionalism of the buildings' design, it has also faced criticism for being too large, cold, and remote.

In recent years, the Place du Luxembourg has become a hotspot for after-work nightlife activity in the European Quarter, primarily on Thursday and Friday nights. The square is colloquially known as Place Lux or Plux by local European bureaucrats and journalists. The trash left on the square by the Thursday night revellers has become an irritant for local residents, and Brussels politicians have threatened to shut down the party.

In February 2024, the John Cockerill Monument was vandalised during a farmers' protest that took place in front of the European Parliament, with the statue of the mechanic Beaufort being severely damaged and burned. The statue was restored over the course of 2024 and replaced on 13 December 2024.

== Layout ==
The Place du Luxembourg largely consists of restaurants and bars that dominate the wide pavements, with some banks and other retail services, serving the civil servants and members of the neighbouring European Parliament, as well as the other European institutions and associated organisations, which are mostly located close by.

In the centre of the square is the Monument to John Cockerill, a prominent British-Belgian 19th-century industrialist, by the sculptor Armand Cattier, which is a near copy of the statue outside Seraing's Town Hall in Liège Province (Wallonia). The figure of Cockerill is leaning on an anvil and is surrounded by industrial figures from that period: a glass-blower or blacksmith, a mechanic, a puddler and a coal miner. On the front of the pedestal is the inscription "To John Cockerill, the father of workers". The base of the pedestal reads Cockerill's motto, "Intelligence" and "Work", as well as "1790-1840", Cockerill's dates of birth and death.

Directly behind the monument on the eastern side is the square's principle structure. The former entrance to Leopold Quarter railway station (now the subterranean Brussels-Luxembourg railway station with its entrance moved east) is a listed building and was taken over by the European Parliament and Belgian authorities as a joint information office and museum. It now houses the European Parliament's "infopoint".

The building forms part of the European Parliament's Espace Léopold (the complex of parliamentary buildings in Brussels) along with two new buildings on either side, which border the square. The whole complex of parliamentary buildings dominate the eastern view of the square, with the dome of the European Parliament's Paul-Henri Spaak building mirroring the clock at the top of the station's façade, creating a popular shot of the European Parliament from the square. Openings on each side of the old station building lead directly to the Esplanade of the European Parliament, the pedestrian mall running the length of the European Parliament.

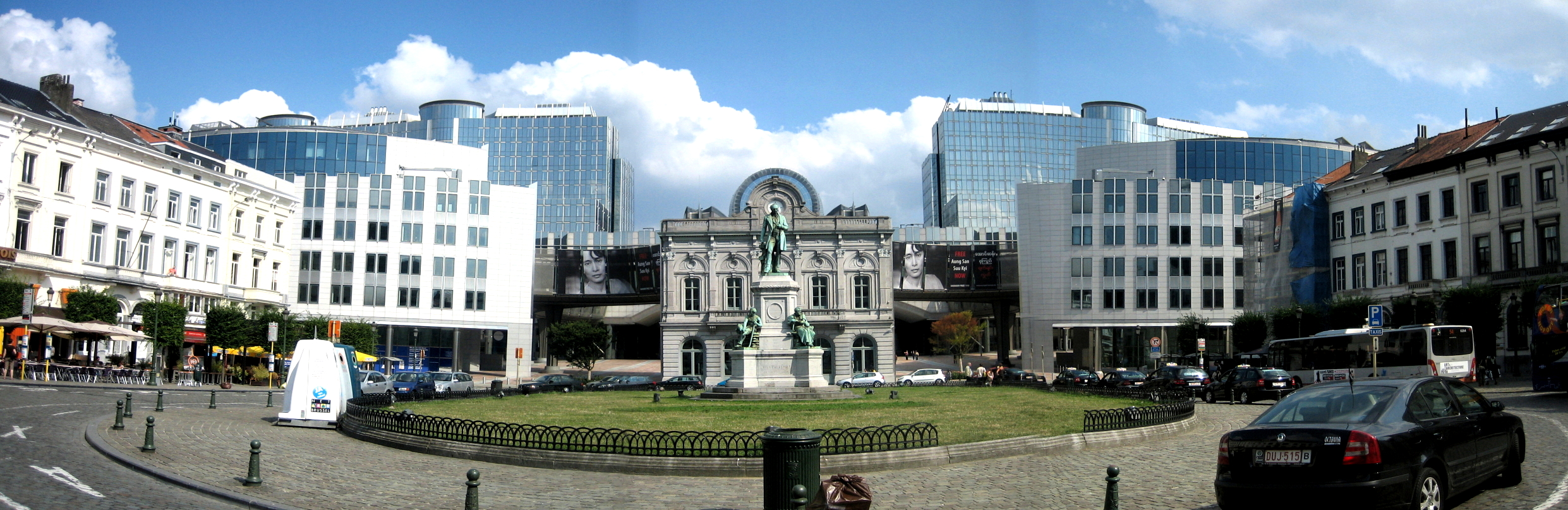
View facing east towards the European Parliament, including the old Brussels-Luxembourg railway station's entrance and the Monument to John Cockerill in front

== Future ==
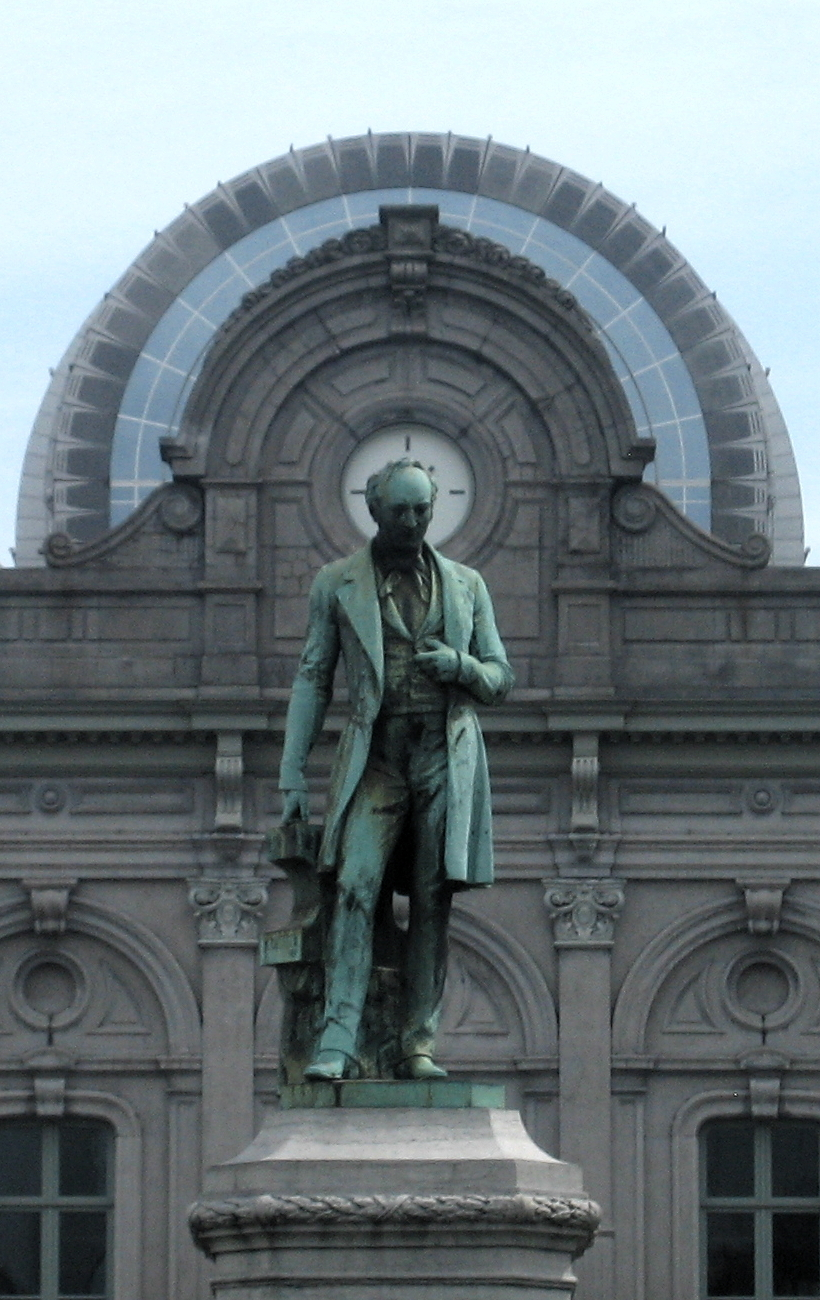
View facing east towards the European Parliament. The alignment of the statue, station and European Parliament is a popular photographers' shot.

In plans to rebuild parts of the European Quarter, the Place du Luxembourg would become one of three main pedestrian squares, each focusing on a different theme. Due to its proximity to the European Parliament, the Place du Luxembourg would focus on citizens. Also planned is the potential clearing of space between the Rue d'Arlon/Aarlenstraat and the Rue de Trêves/Trierstraat for a new square, possibly as a long extension of the Place du Luxembourg creating a vast boulevard-like public space. The Brussels transportation authority, STIB/MIVB, has provisional plans to build a metro extension with a stop on the square at Brussels-Luxembourg railway station. In 2011, plans were announced in partnership between the municipality of Ixelles and the European Parliament to try to reduce the "mess" left by revellers on busy nights, which the local authority deemed to be "totally unacceptable".

In addition, following damage to the lawn and area around the statue in 2024, the Ixelles municipality and the Brussels Region agreed to restore the whole area, wanting to return it to "the spirit" of the original layout. This would include a new lawn, four majestic trees (magnolias grandiflora) and perennial beds, in line with the square's design dating back to the 1850s. The trees had long since been removed from the square. The small central median strip is typical of a station square from this period, and is one of the last in Brussels. Local residents from the Association du Quartier Léopold would like to see the historical listing of the neoclassical façades and the station extended to the entire square.

== See also ==
- Neoclassical architecture in Belgium
- History of Brussels
- Belgium in the long nineteenth century
