= Tilman-François Suys =

Tilman-François Suys (also spelled "Tieleman Frans Suys" or "Tieleman Franciscus Suys")
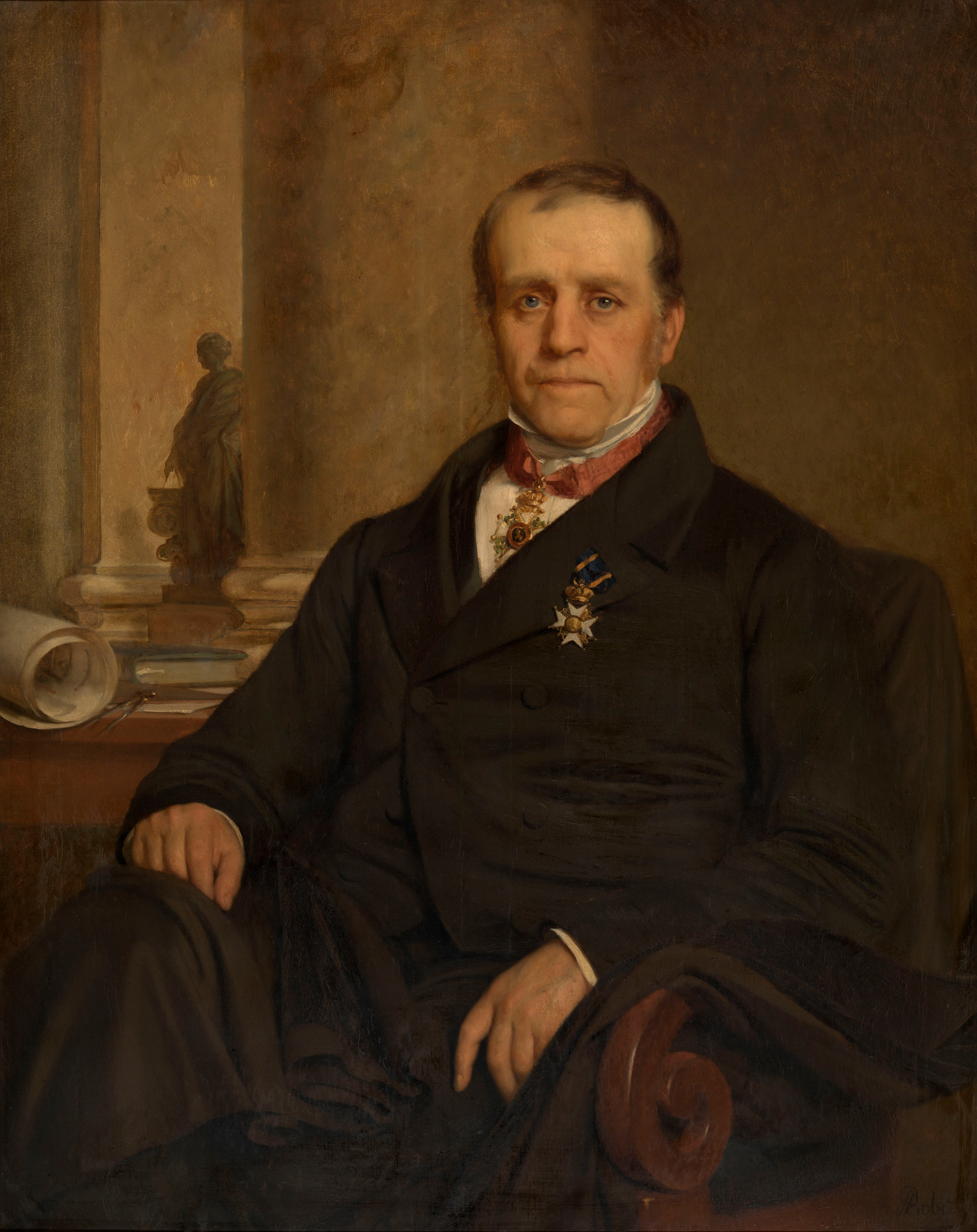
- Born: 1 July 1783; Ostend, Austrian Netherlands (modern-day Belgium)
- Died: 11 July 1861 (aged 78); Wingene, Belgium
- Occupation: Architect
- Buildings: Botanical Garden in Brussels Moses and Aaron Church in Amsterdam Royal Palace in Brussels

Tilman-François Suys (in French) or Tieleman Frans Suys (in Dutch) (1 July 1783 – 22 July 1864) was a Belgian architect who also worked in the Netherlands.

== Biography ==
Suys completed his architectural education in Paris, where he studied under Charles Percier and won the Prix de Rome in 1812. During his stay in Rome he became a protégé of King William I of the Netherlands the new king of the Belgian and Dutch provinces unified in the United Kingdom of the Netherlands. In 1817 he settled in Amsterdam and worked as an architect for the Dutch Crown. In this period his style shows the marks of the Empire style created for Napoleon by his teacher Charles Percier and Pierre François Léonard Fontaine.

From 1825 onwards, Suys was employed on a series of royal commissions in Brussels, a city that, together with The Hague in the province of Holland, had been given the title of capital of the new established kingdom. His projects in Brussels were more severely neoclassical in character. Important creations in Brussels include the great conservatory of the Botanical Garden, which is noted for its innovative use of iron and glass construction, as well as the Royal Palace.

After the Belgian Revolution, which established Belgium's independence from the Netherlands, Suys remained in Brussels. He devoted himself mainly to the restoration of the new nation's historic monuments. Some of these projects, especially his Gothic Revival restorations, were not historically accurate, and were later harshly criticized. His renovation (started in 1832) of the medieval Bouchout Castle at Meise, near Brussels, included not only Gothic Revival additions but also the earliest example of Flemish Renaissance Revival interior architecture in Belgium.

Suys was also engaged in urban-scale projects, notably the project for the Leopold Quarter, commissioned to him in the 1830s and carried out in the following years. Eventually Suys continued to design other buildings in the new quarter designed by him. An example of such monumental buildings he designed later in his career is the Italianate Saint Joseph's Church (1842–1849) on the Square Frère Orban/Frère-Orbansquare. Suys continued to carry out commissions in the Netherlands after the revolution such as the Roman Catholic, Mozes and Aaron Church in Amsterdam, built between 1831 and 1847.

From 1835 to 1861 Suys was a professor at the Royal Academy of Fine Arts in Brussels, where he taught almost every important Belgian architect of the younger generation such as Hendrik Beyaert, Joseph Poelaert and Alphonse Balat. Through his teaching he deeply influenced later Belgian architecture in both the neoclassical and the eclectic or revivalist styles.

Tilman-François Suys was the father and teacher of Léon-Pierre Suys who would also play an important role as an architect and urban planner in 19th-century Belgium.

== List of works ==
=== Churches ===
- 1822–1826: Reconstruction (after a fire) of the Round Lutheran Church (Ronde Lutherse Kerk), in Amsterdam (in collaboration with the architect Jan de Greef)
- 1837–1841: St. Anthony's Church (Sint-Anthoniuskerk), better known as the Moses and Aaron Church (Mozes en Aäronkerk), in Amsterdam
- 1842: St. Martin's Church, in Gothic Revival style, in Jemeppe-sur-Sambre
- 1842–1849: Church of St. Joseph, Square Frère-Orban/Frère-Orbansquare, in Brussels
- 1843–1844: Green Market Church (Groenmarktkerk) in Haarlem
- 1847–1850: St. George's Church (Sint-Joriskerk), in Gothic Revival style, in Antwerp
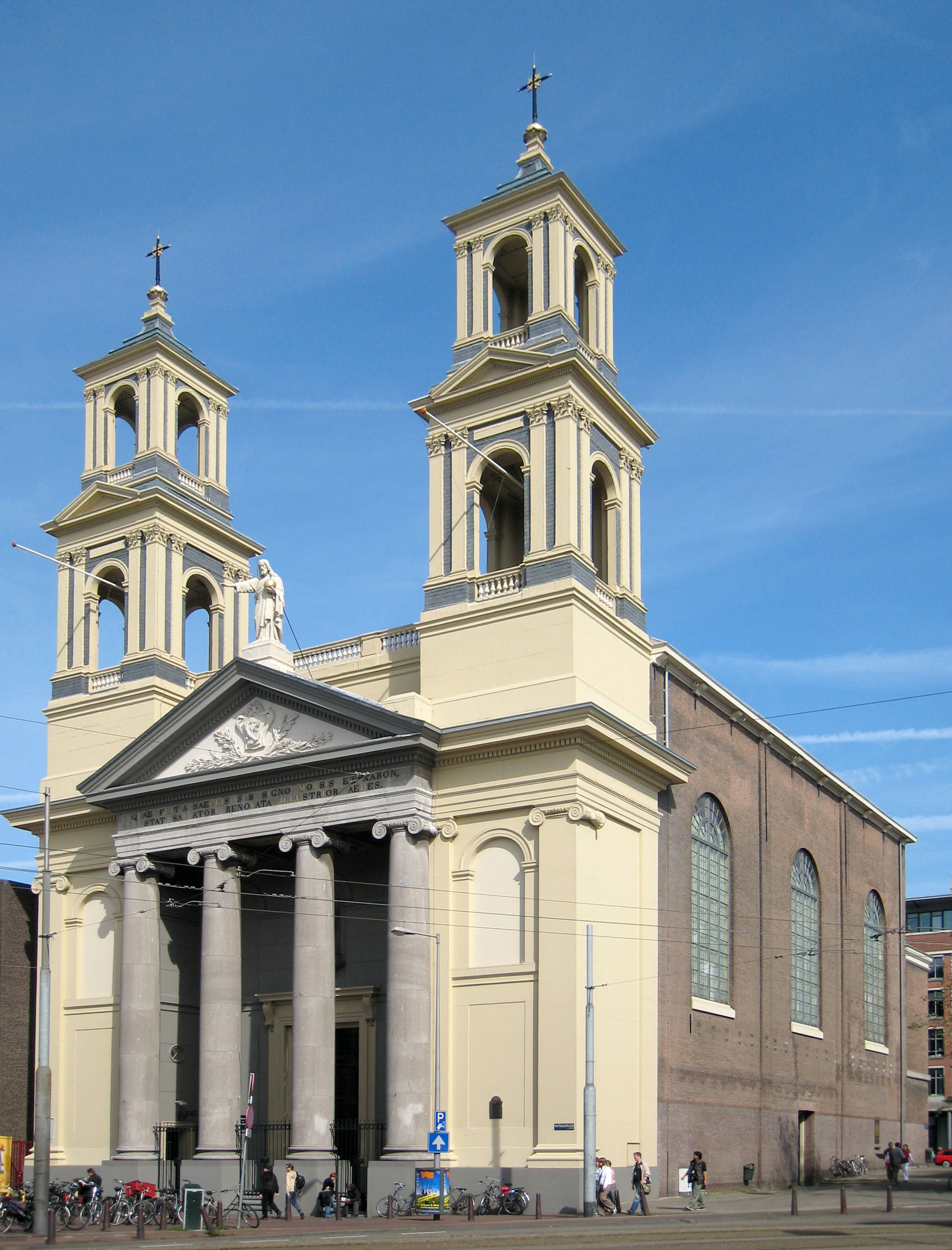
Moses and Aaron Church, Amsterdam (1837–1841)

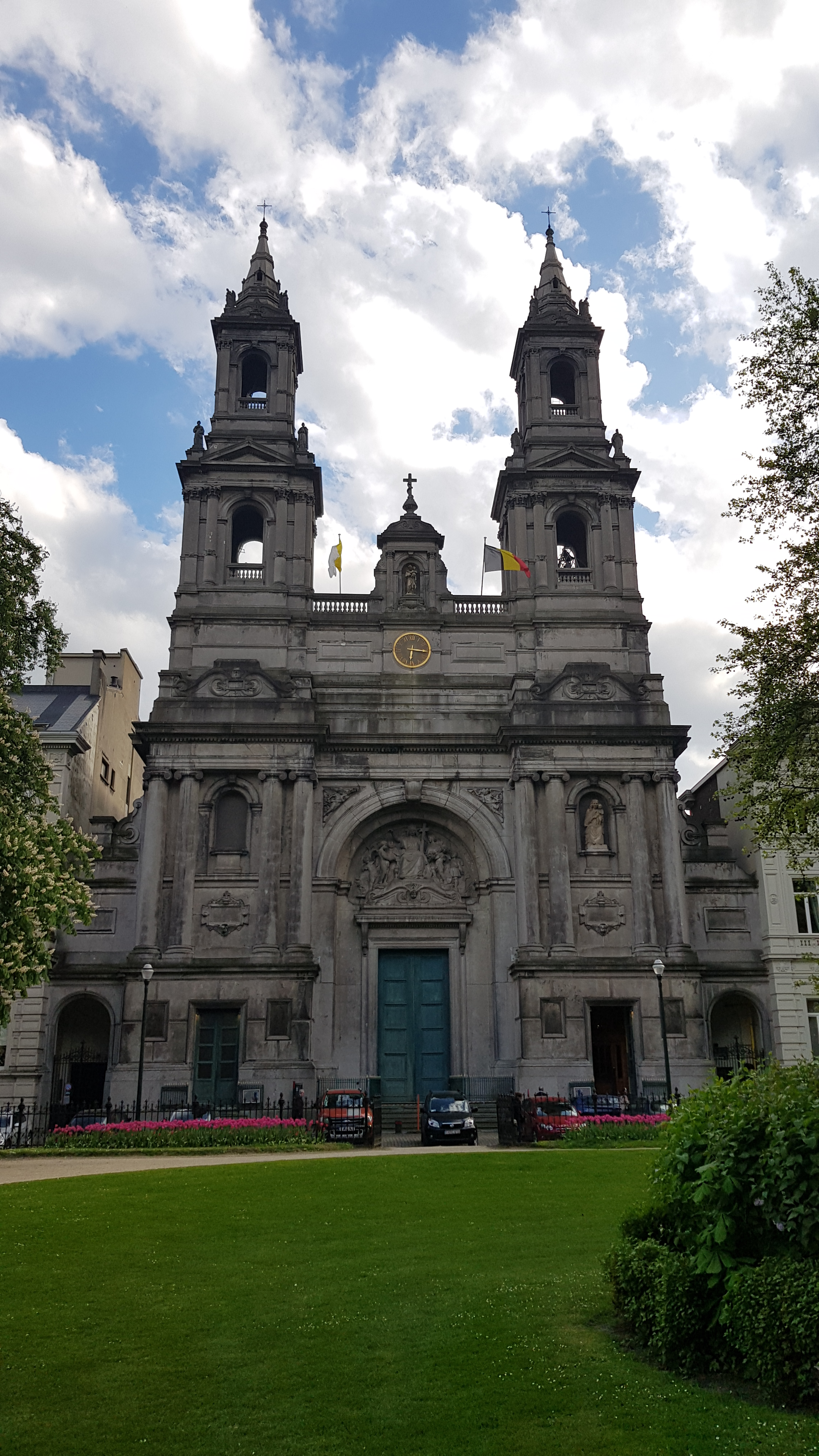
Church of St. Joseph, Brussels (1842–1849)

=== Public buildings ===
- 1820–1829: Royal Palace in Brussels
- 1823–1828: Academy Palace, formerly the palace of the Prince of Orange, in Brussels. Completion of the designs of the architect Charles Vander Straeten.
- 1829–1834: Great conservatory of the Botanical Garden in Brussels
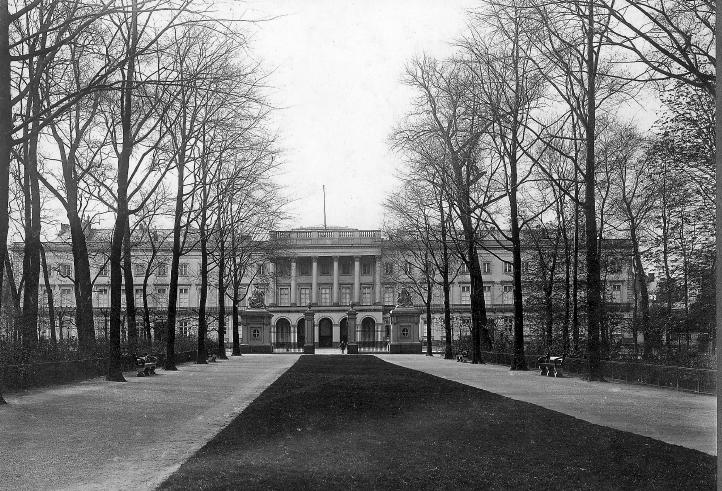
Former façade of the Royal Palace, Brussels (1820–1829)

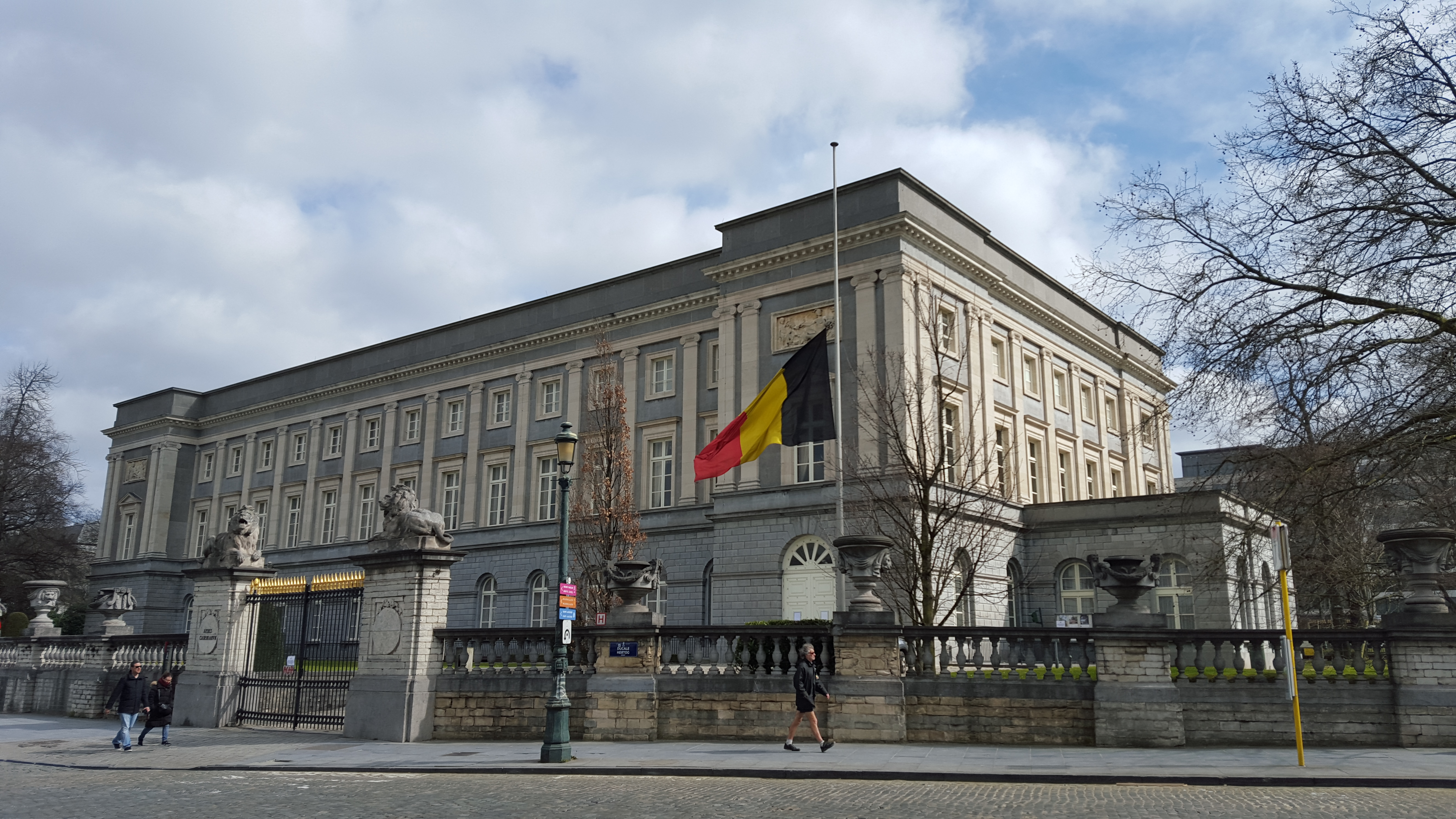
Academy Palace, Brussels (1823–1828)

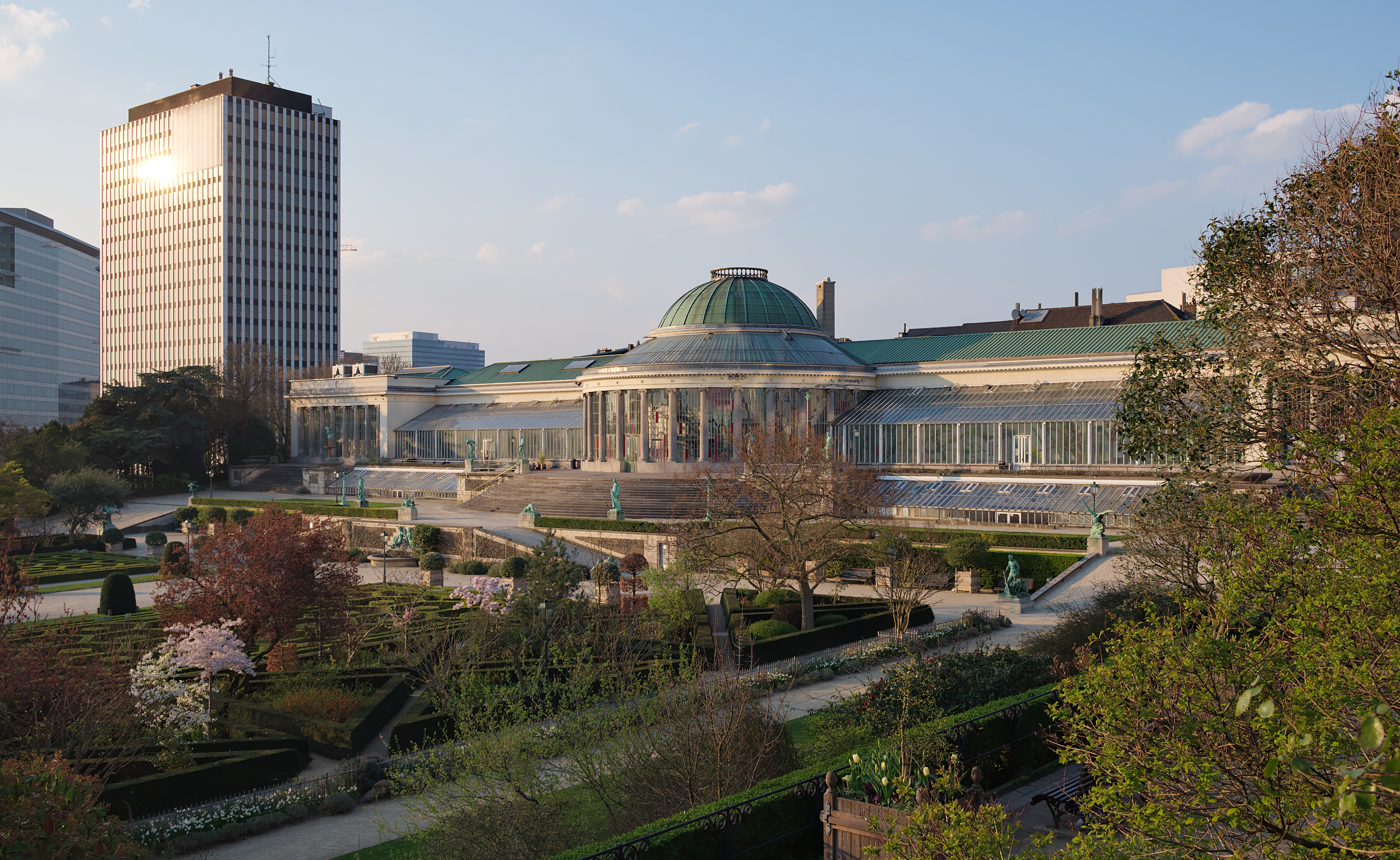
Great conservatory of the Botanical Garden, Brussels (1829–1834)

=== Urban design ===
- 1830–: Project of the new Leopold Quarter in Brussels

=== Private buildings ===
- 1830–1836: Mariemont Castle (Château Waroquée), in Morlanwelz (destroyed by fire in 1960)
- 1832–: Bouchout Castle in Meise (restoration and rebuilding in Gothic Revival)
- 1830–: Egmont Palace in Brussels (extension of the left wing)
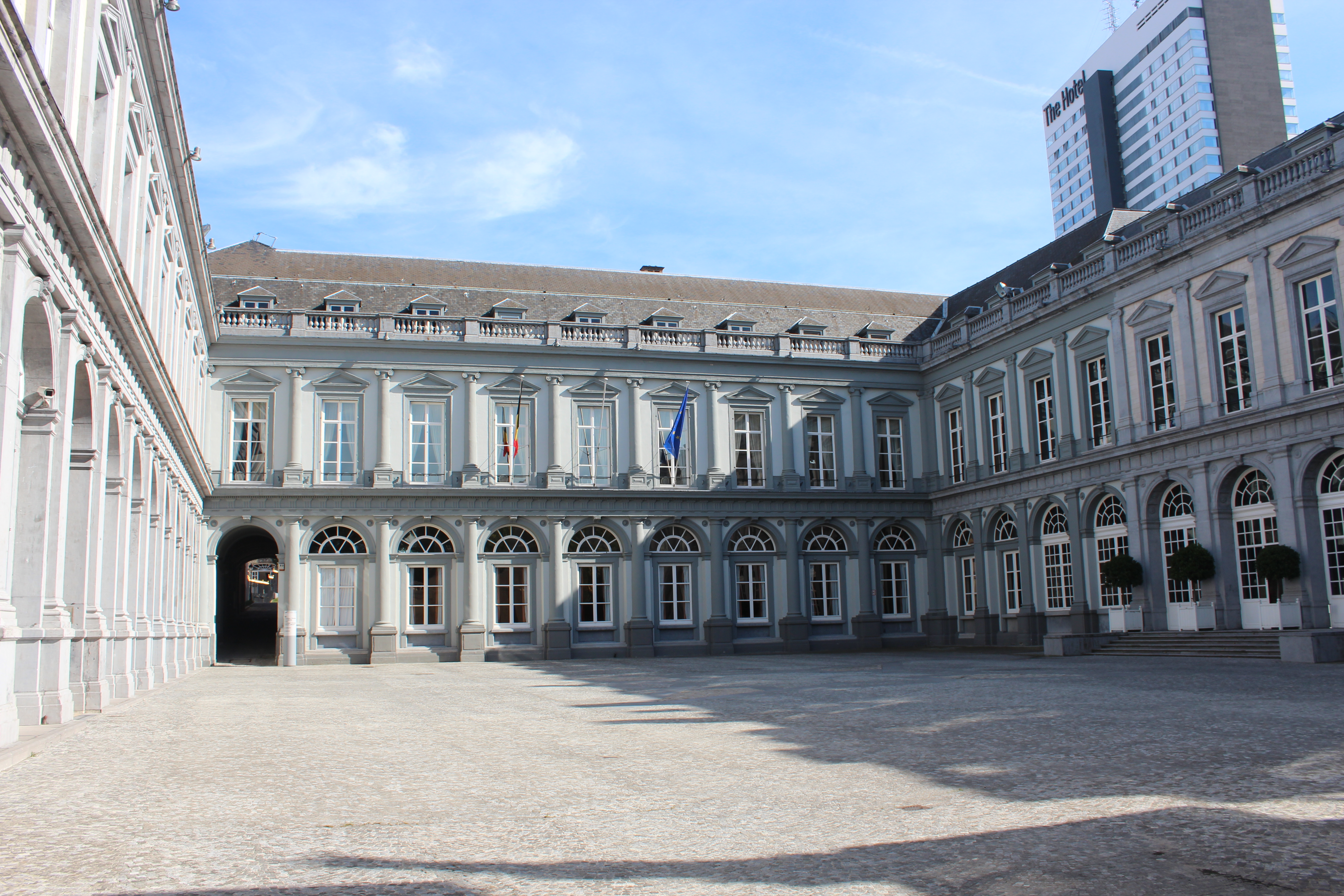
Egmont Palace, Brussels (1830–)

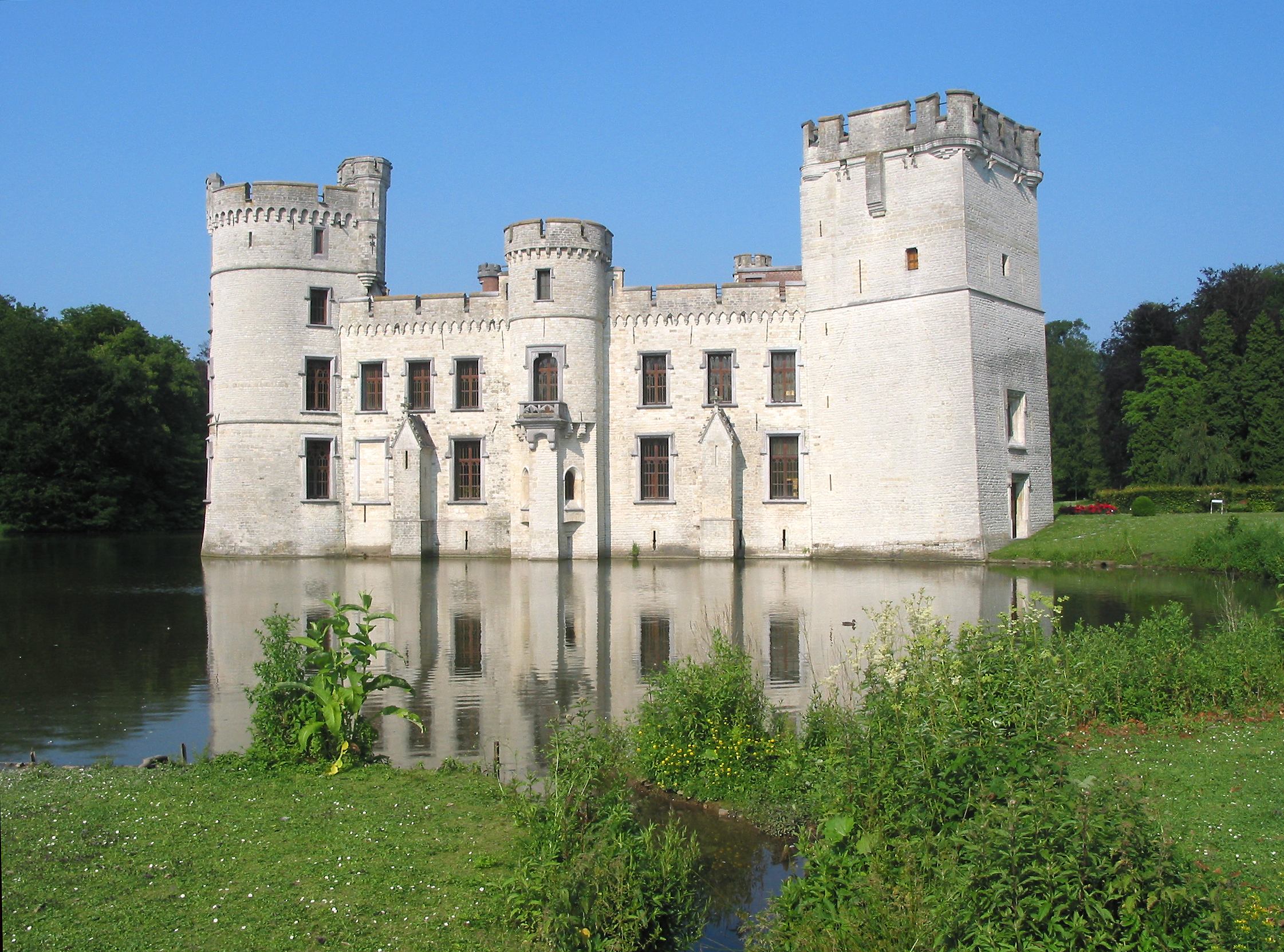
Bouchout Castle, Meise (1832–)

=== Other ===
- Tomb for the soprano Maria Malibran in Laeken Cemetery, in Brussels
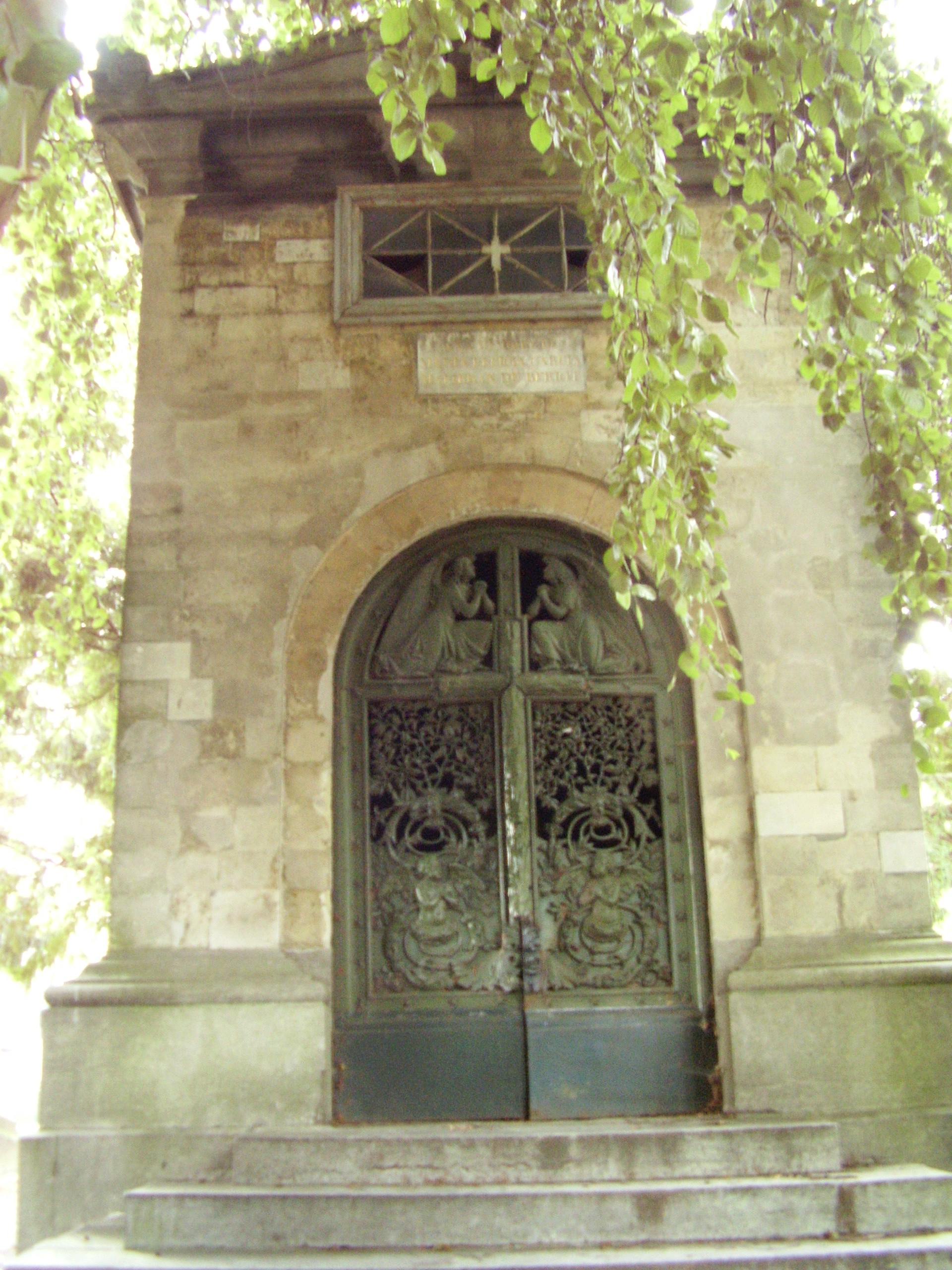
Tomb of Maria Malibran, Brussels
