= Louis Montoyer =

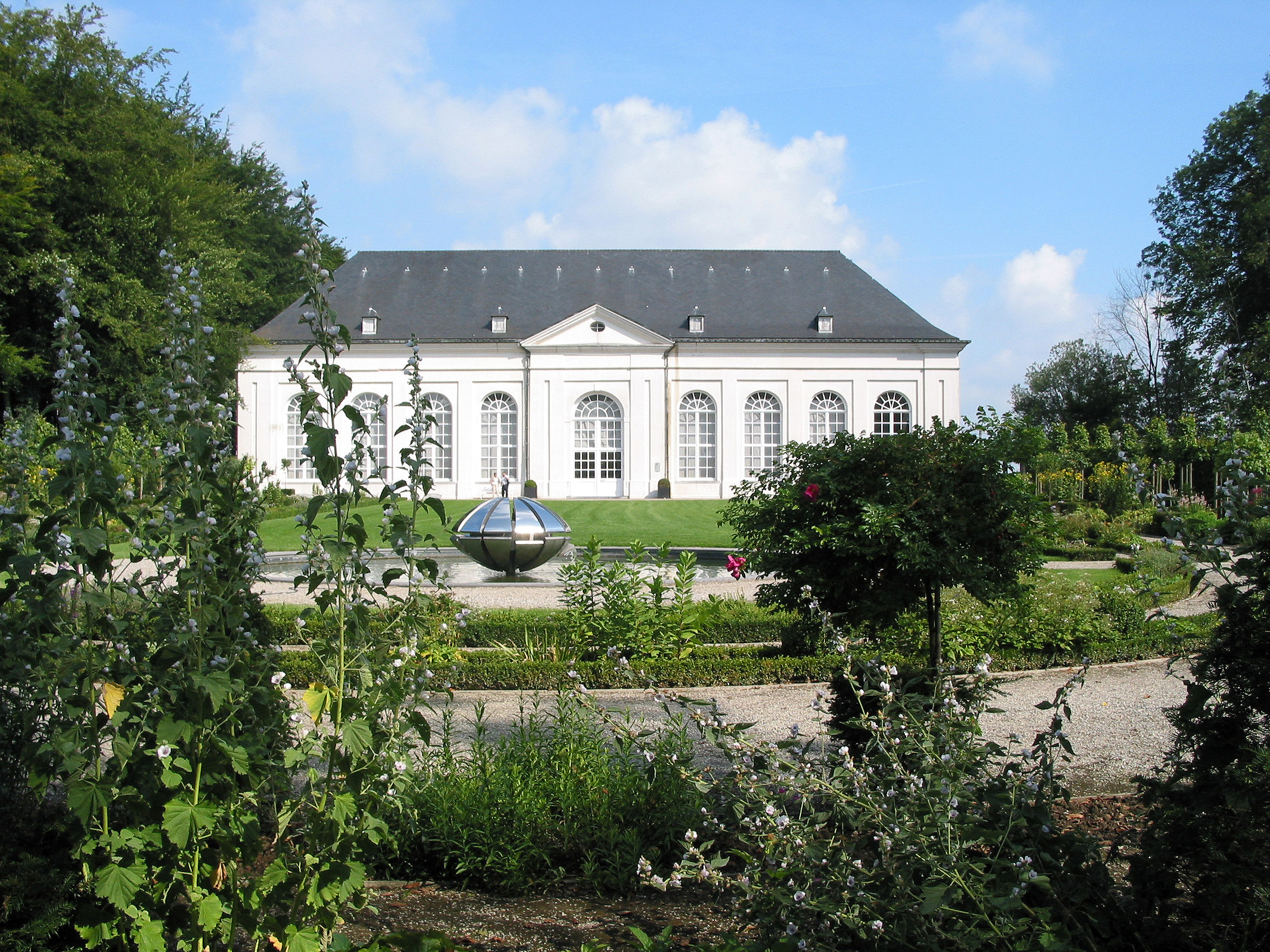
The Orangery of the Chateau de Seneffe

Louis Montoyer (1747, Mariemont, Austrian Netherlands, now Belgium – 5 June 1811, Vienna) was an 18th-century architect, principally active in Brussels and Vienna.

== Life ==
He worked in Brussels as an architect and building contractor from 1778 onwards. Although he has been credited as the architect of the Royal Palace of Laeken (for Prince Albert of Saxony, Duke of Teschen and his wife Archduchess Maria-Christina), later research made clear he was merely executing the designs of other architects such as Charles de Wailly. In 1795, he came to Vienna with Prince Albert of Saxony, Duke of Teschen, who had already appointed him his court architect in 1780. There he first worked on rebuilding the duke's palace, now known as the Albertina. He also built the Ceremonial Hall at the Hofburg, connecting the Leopoldian part of the building with the old Imperial Palace. Also in Vienna, Montoyer built the Palais Rasumofsky for the former Russian ambassador Andrey Razumovsky.

On 25 September 1805 he was made an honorary citizen of Vienna, and in 1807 he was appointed court architect to Francis II. He was buried in the St. Marx Cemetery, where his memorial can still be seen.

== Works ==
=== Belgium ===
- Involved in the completion of Château Charles, when Laurent-Benoît Dewez was dismissed.
- Involved in the works at Château of Mariemont
- Royal Park Theatre in Brussels (1782)
- Supervision of the building of the Royal Palace of Laeken after the plans of Charles de Wailly (1782–1784)
- Church of St. James on Coudenberg in Brussels
- The Orangery of the Chateau de Seneffe (1782)
- Designs for an extension of Church of Saint Joseph, Waterloo (1789)

=== Vienna ===
- Renovation and extension of the Albertina (1801–1804)
- Redoute Baden, (1801, demolished in 1908)
- Hall of Ceremonies at the Hofburg Imperial Palace (1801–02)
- Rebuilding of the Hofburg Chapel (1802)
- Extension of the Churhaus (1806)
- Transformation of the Malteserkirche (1806–1808)
- Palais Rasumofsky (1806–07)
