= Palais Rasumofsky =

Coordinates: 48°12′15″N 16°23′32″E

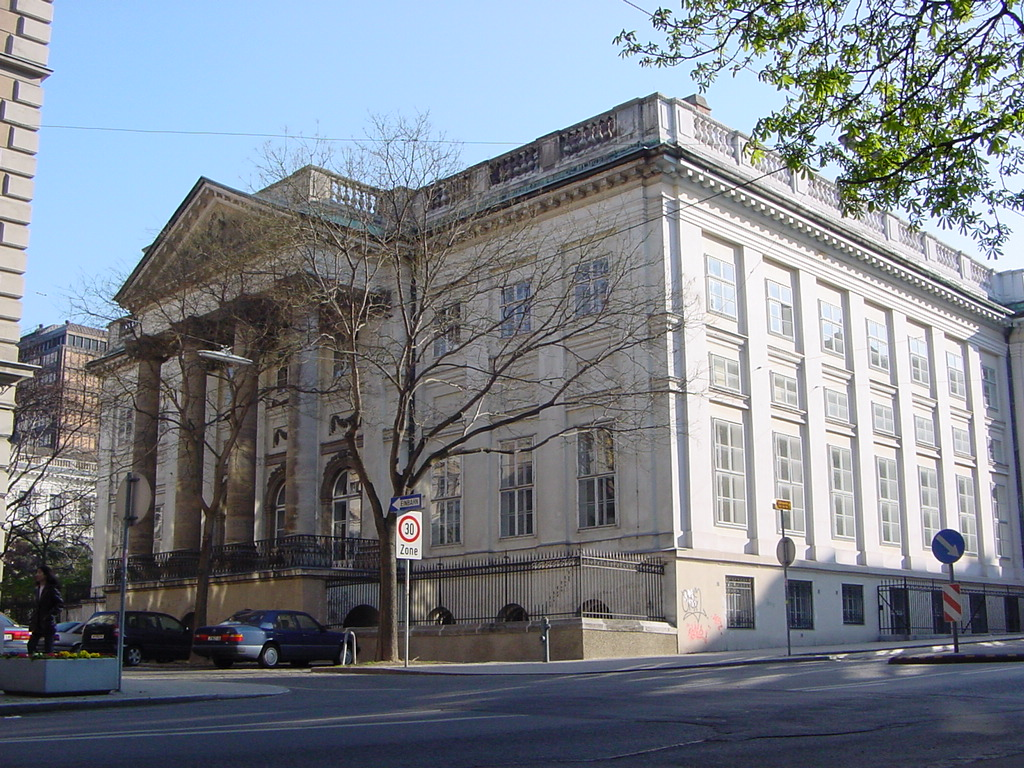
Palais Rasumofsky in 2002.

Palais Rasumofsky (Russian: Разумовски-пале) is a palace in Vienna, Austria.

The palace was commissioned by Prince Andrey Kyrillovich Razumovsky as a Neoclassic embassy worthy of the representative of Alexander I. It was built at the prince's own expense and to the designs of Louis Montoyer, in Landstraße, close to the city center of Vienna. He filled it with antiquities and modern works of art. On New Year's Eve 1814, the prince held a glittering ball with Tsar Alexander I as guest of honour. Probably the only person in Vienna who was invited but did not go, was Ludwig van Beethoven. To accommodate the guests, Razumovsky erected a temporary ballroom extension, heated by a flue from the palace. After all the guests had gone, the flue caught fire, setting the ballroom ablaze and burning out roomfuls of art in the palace. Rasumovsky, though he was raised to Prince the following year, was never the same. He lived in seclusion in Vienna until his death in 1836. From 1852 until 2005 the building hosted the Federal Geological Office. In 1862 the street on which the palace is located was named Rasumofskygasse.

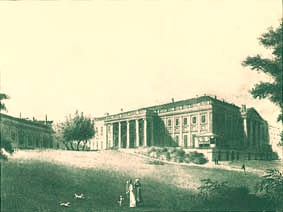
The Palais Rasumofsky in Vienna in a contemporary etching by Eduard Gurk.
