= Collegiate Church of Saint Begga =

Coordinates: 50°29′13″N 05°06′13″E

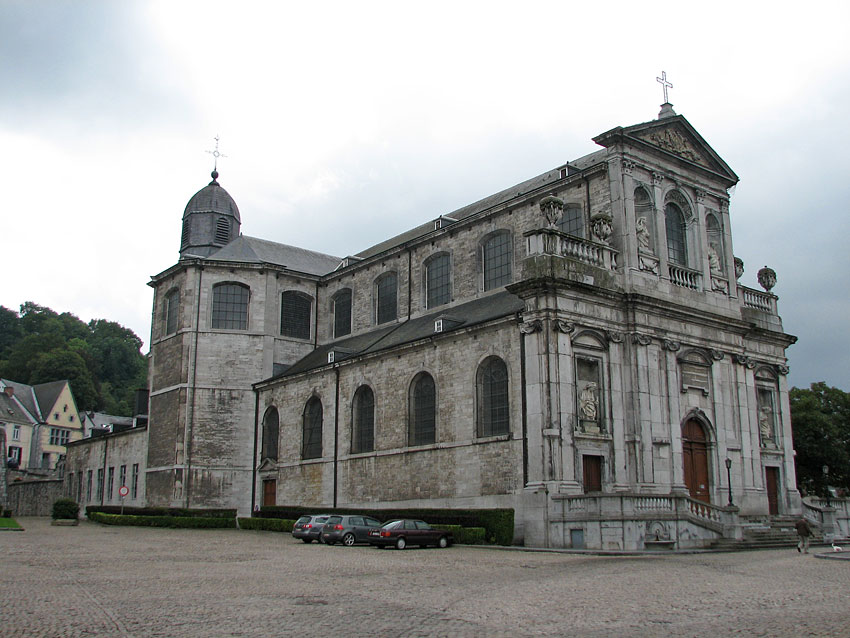
Collegiate Church of Saint Begga

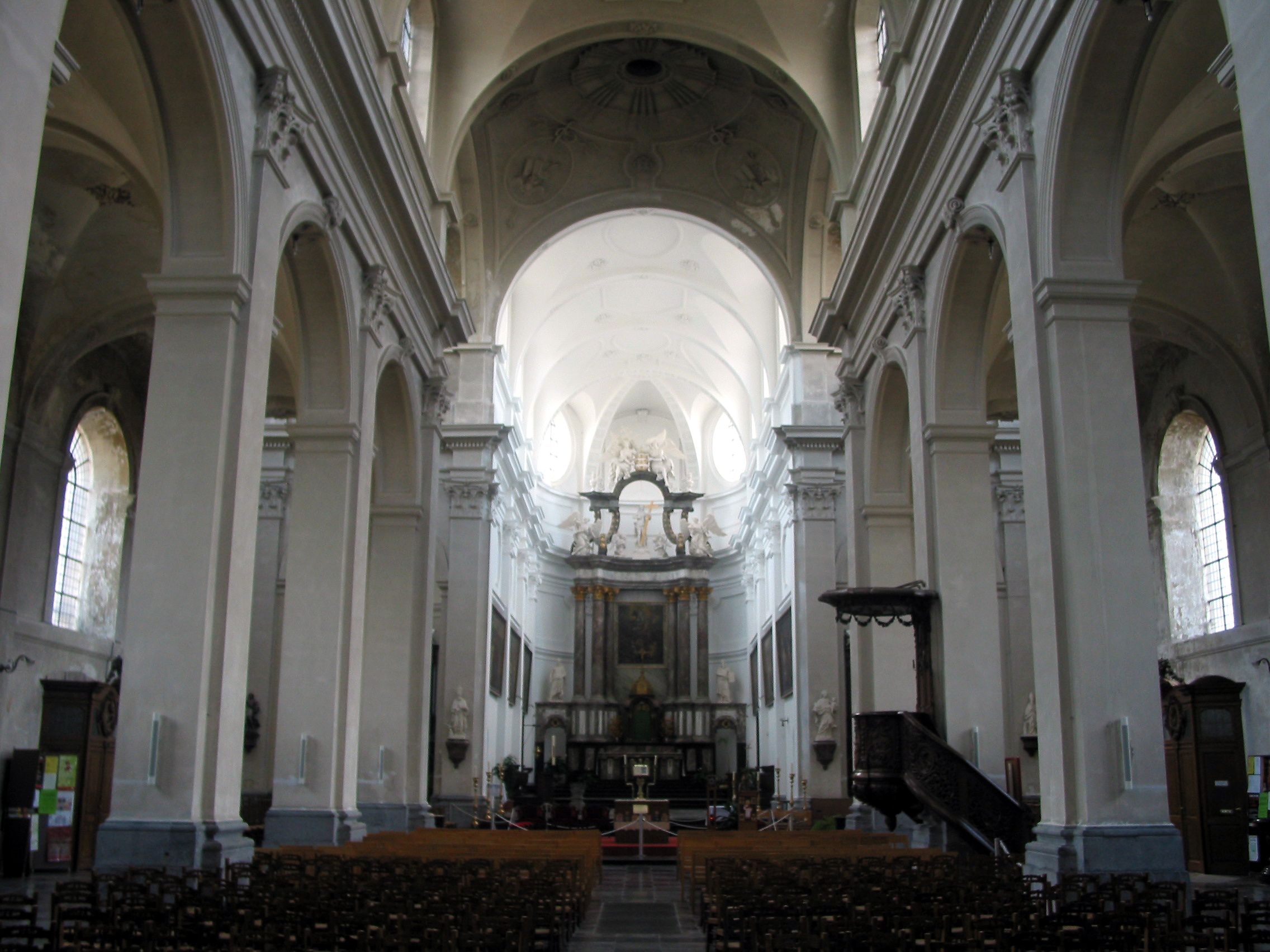
Interior of the church

The Collegiate Church of Saint Begga (French: Collégiale Sainte-Begge) is a collegiate church in Andenne, Belgium. Founded in the 7th century, the currently visible church dates from 1770 to 1775 and was designed by architect Laurent-Benoît Dewez.

== History ==
The church traces its origins to the 7th century, when an abbey was founded in Andenne by Saint Begga. By the 11th century, the abbey had been transformed into a collegiate church, which later developed into an aristocratic community centred around it. Eventually, the living quarters took on a more monastic character and had their own churches. By the 18th century, there were seven churches and corresponding communities, all surrounded by a wall. The current church replaced these earlier structures and was built between 1770–1775, based on designs by the architect Laurent-Benoît Dewez.

== Architecture ==
The church is built of limestone, the floor plan consisting of a nave with two aisles, five bays long. The transept has two side chapels and ends in two apses; the choir also ends in an apse. The façade is in two levels wherein, the first is decorated with Ionic pilasters and crowned by an entablature; and the second storey has Corinthian pilasters and is crowned by a pediment.

== Sources cited ==
- Le patrimoine monumental de la Belgique (in French). Vol. 5 (2 ed.). Pierre Mardaga, éditeur. 1998 [1975]. pp. 21–22. ISBN 2-87009-677-1.
