= Château de Seneffe =

18th-century château in Wallonia, Belgium

Coordinates: 50.525°N 4.269°E

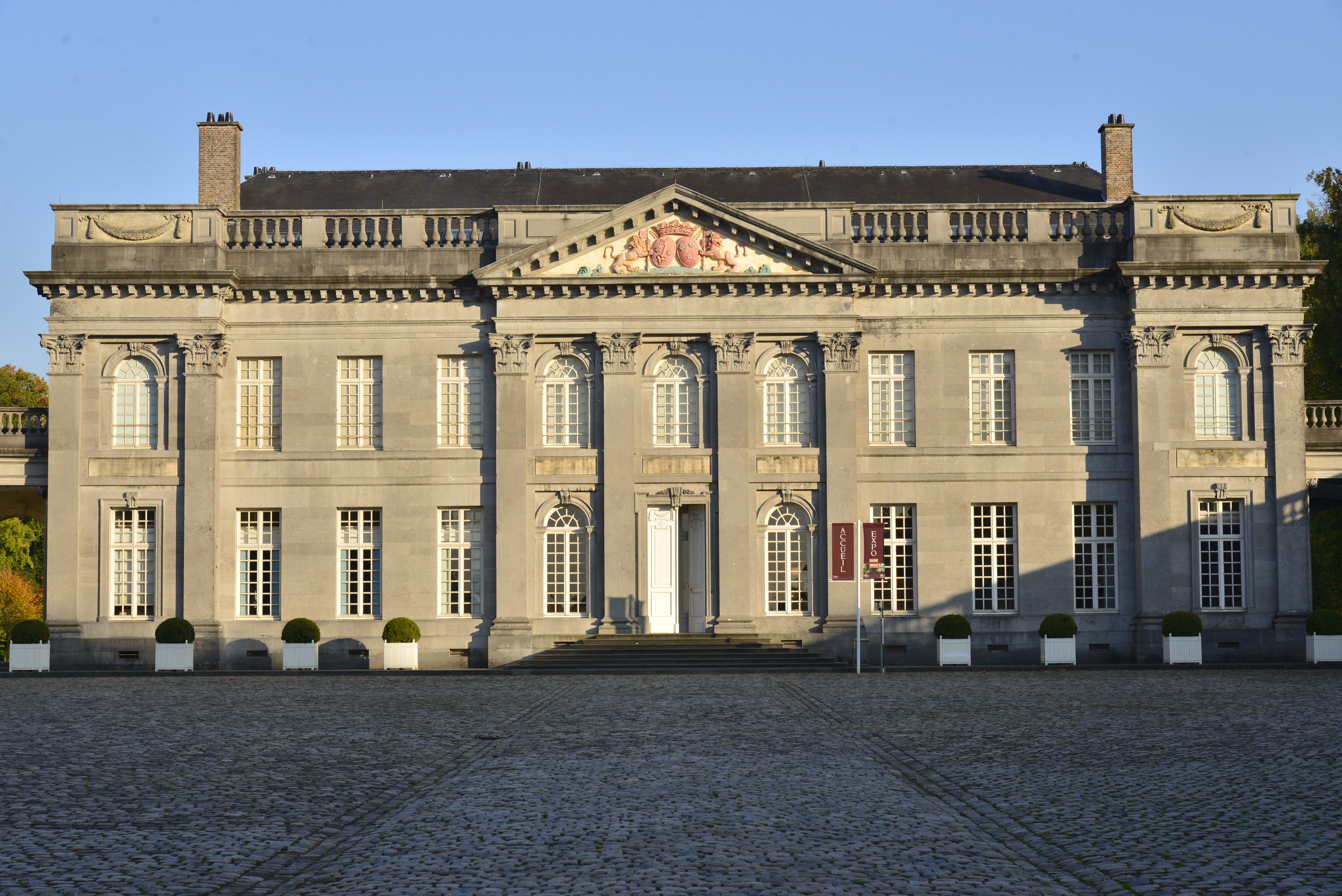
Facade of the Château de Seneffe

The Château of Seneffe or Château de Seneffe is an 18th-century château located in the municipality of Seneffe in the province of Hainaut, Wallonia, Belgium. The château is property of the French Community of Belgium and serves as the "Centre de l'orfèvrerie de la communauté française" which displays a collection of antique (mainly 18th century) silverware.

== History ==
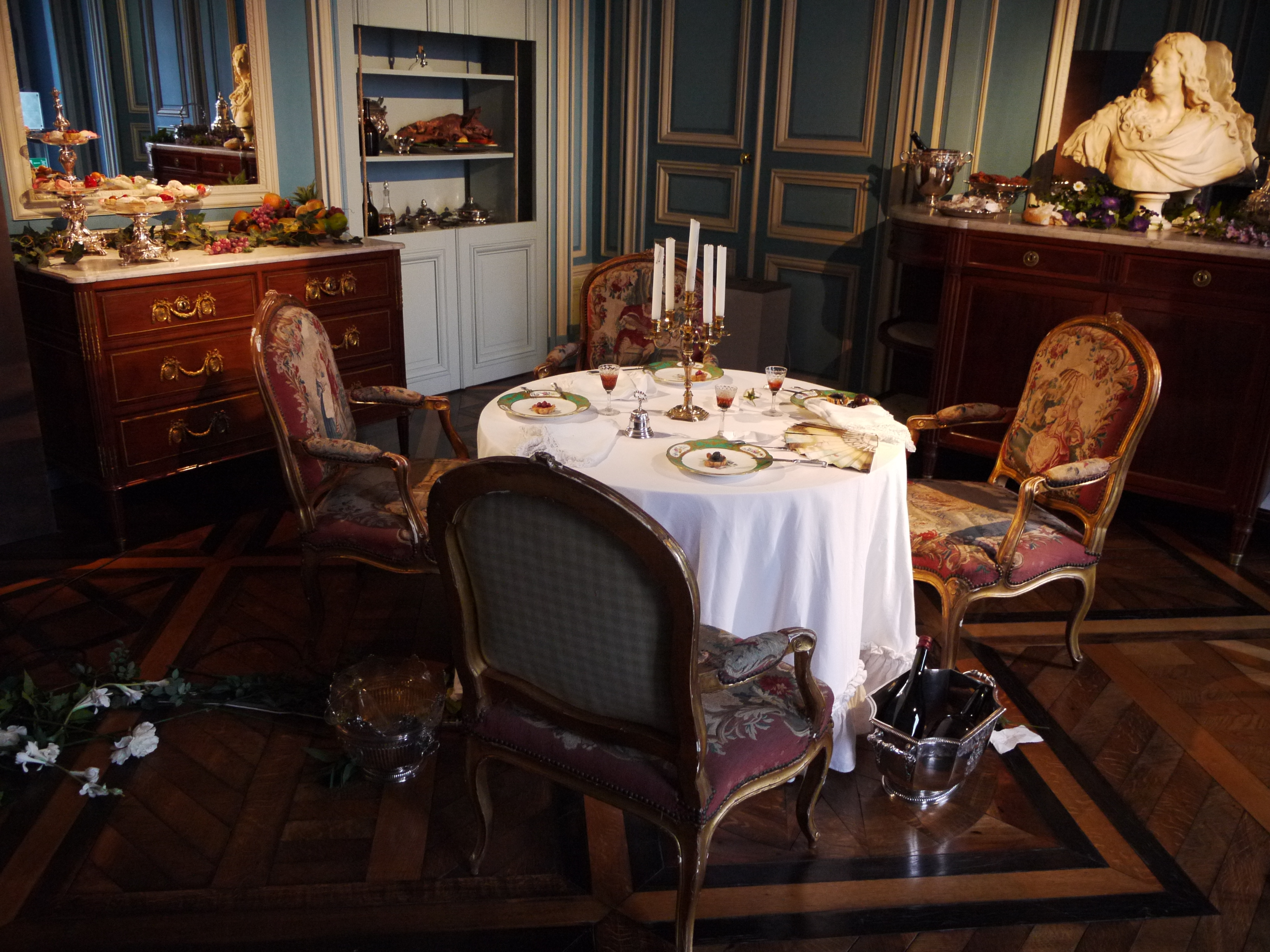
Display of furniture and silver

In 1758 the 'Seigneurie de Seneffe' was bought by Julien Depestre, a Walloon merchant who earned a fortune by selling goods to the Imperial Austrian troops stationed in the Austrian Netherlands. Depestre's new status as a wealthy and influential individual was also confirmed by the acquisition of noble titles such as 'Seigneur de Seneffe' (Lord of Seneffe) and 'Count of Turnhout'. The new castle designed by Laurent-Benoît Dewez had to match with Depestre's new noble status. It was erected between 1763 and 1768 in a novel neoclassical style. When Julien Depestre died in 1774 the decoration of the château and the embellishment of the park were continued by his widow and his eldest son Joseph II Depestre.

After the French Revolution and the subsequent occupation of the Austrian Netherlands by the French Republic, the extraordinary art collection (1797) and the château were confiscated (1799).

It was bought by a figurehead assigned by the Depestre family and came back into their possession after the ascent of Napoleon as Emperor of the French in 1804. The château was sold by Joseph II Depestre's son Honoré in 1837 and bought by the Daminet family. In 1888 it was acquired from them by Baron Goffinet. The last private proprietor was a Belgian banker of Jewish origin, Franz Philipson, who bought the 'domaine' in 1909. In the advent of the Second World War the Philippson family escaped to England and the United States. When German troops invaded Belgium in 1940 the château was confiscated by the Germans and used as a local headquarters and a summer residence for the German military Governor of Belgium, General Alexander von Falkenhausen. After the liberation of Belgium in 1944 it was occupied by the US Army. It was acquired from the Philippson heirs in 1952 by the "Collège du Sacré Coeur" which used it as a school between 1952 and 1963. The castle of Seneffe was then abandoned for 7 years, until the Belgian State decided to purchase it in 1970. During these years the castle was severely looted by people who removed and sold valuable interior decoration such as marble fireplaces and carved wainscotings. After the acquisition by the Belgian state the deterioration continued due to defected doors, windows and roofing. Extensive interior and exterior renovations were only started after 1978 and were not finished until 1995.

== Architecture ==
The château of Seneffe offers an example of a mid-18th-century noble residence. In general, its design elements follow that of the example of French noble and royal residences. It can be compared with the Petit Trianon built at the same time (1762–1768) by Ange-Jacques Gabriel for Louis XV.

Pieces such as the colonnades flanking the central frontal courtyard are details introduced by architect Dewez who trained in Italy under Luigi Vanvitelli. Dewez also found inspiration in neoclassical English country houses of his time.

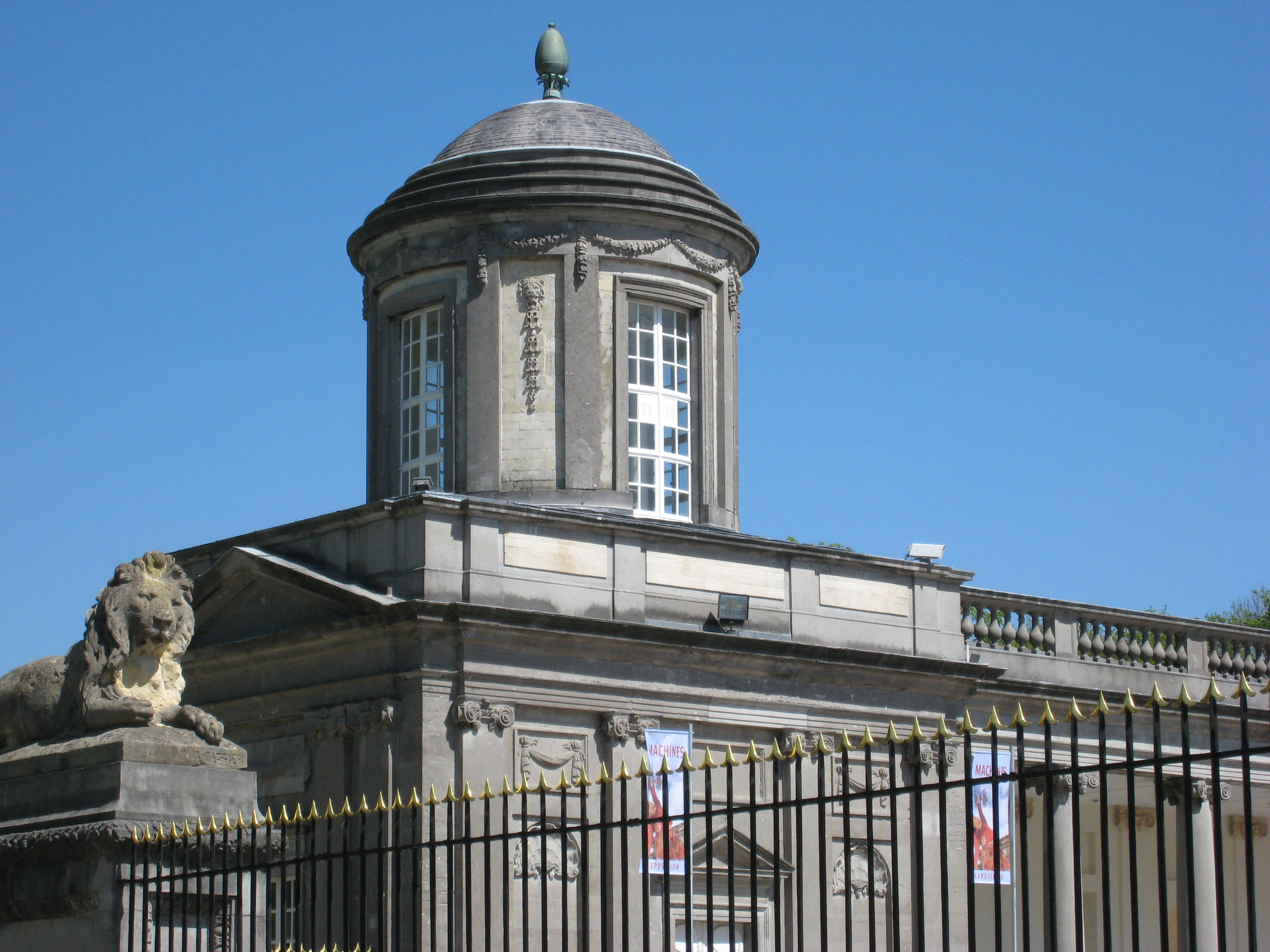
Pavilion at the end of the left gallery (Chapel)

A wide tree-lined alley starting in the village of Seneffe gives access to the castle and its grounds. At the end of the alley a wide lawn provides an unhampered view on the broad courtyard (Cour d'honneur) in front of the castle. The courtyard is closed by a monumental wrought iron fence which has a gilded gate in the middle. The actual château or corps de logis is flanked by two long colonnaded galleries (70 m) with a pavilion on each end which forms a very monumental entry to the château. The monolithic columns of the galleries are in the Ionic order. A terrace with a balustered railing is on top of the galleries. The blind wall of each gallery is adorned with semi-domed and rectangular niches which contain decorative vases and sculptures. The pavilions at the end of each gallery are very elegant buildings decorated with pilasters in the composite order, niches, and pediment-topped doors. They both have a domed second storey of which the right one houses a clock and a bell. The left pavilion is furnished as the château's chapel and the domed second storey serves here as a lantern providing zenithal light to the interior. Each gallery is interrupted by two arcaded passages, flanked by pairs of composite pilasters, and giving access to the so-called 'communs' (originally containing kitchens, mews, a farm) on the left side, to a 'potager' and 'verger' (kitchen garden and orchard) on the right side, and to the park behind the castle.

The facade of the corps de logis consists of five bays separated by monumental composite pilasters connecting the two main storeys. The middle bay stands out slightly and is topped by a pediment which contains the coats of arms of Joseph Depestre and his wife flanked by gilded lions. A stair leads to the front door and into the entrance hall on the piano nobile. The two lateral bays are also flanked by composite pilasters. A molded cornice surrounds the entire building and is topped by a balustered railing only interrupted by the pediment in the middle and by a blind railing decorated with a 'guirlande' above the lateral bays. This railing partly hides the slate roof. Like the galleries the facades of the corps de logis are entirely executed in local "Pierre bleu du Hainaut" (Blue stone of Hainaut) or "Petit-Granit" a very hard greyish-blue limestone. This durable and expensive material also stresses the prestige of the building.

== Interior ==
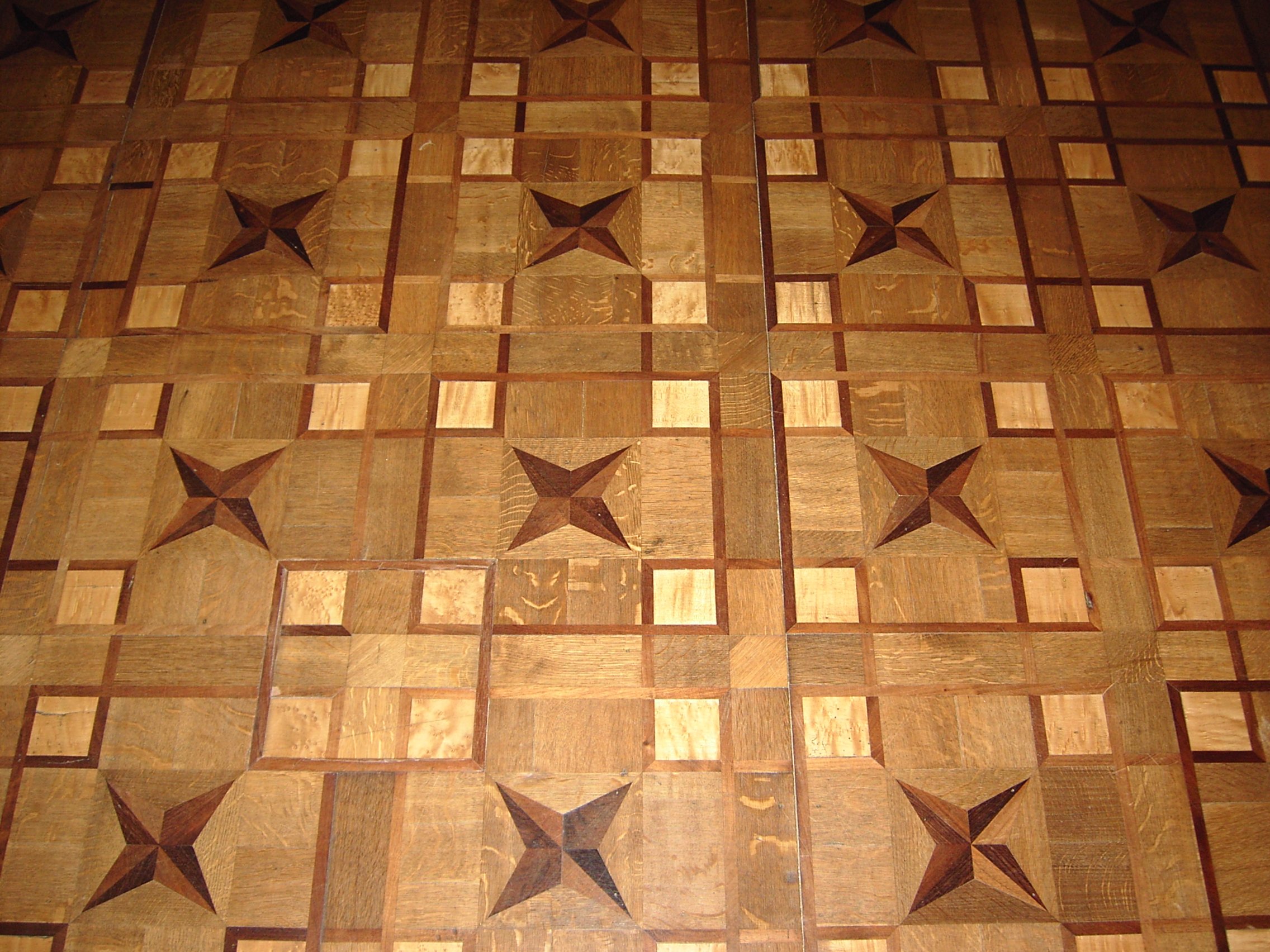
One of the magnificent 'Parquets' in a room at the Château de Seneffe

Most parts of the original decoration of walls, floors and ceilings are still preserved, as are most of the marble fireplaces. After the extensive damage of the 1960s and 1970s elements such as fireplaces, wainscotting and flooring was partly reconstructed. Some original elements stolen after WWII were even traced back on the art market.

The sumptuous interiors contain elaborated 'parquets', fine decorated stucco ceilings of which some are gilded, sculpted and molded 'boiseries' and fine marble floorings and fireplaces mostly executed in Belgian marble. The style of the interior could be characterized as an early continental neoclassicism with French inspiration. In some rooms the influence of the late rococo style is still apparent, whereas in others a more 'classical' approach is discernible.

== Park and 'Follies' ==
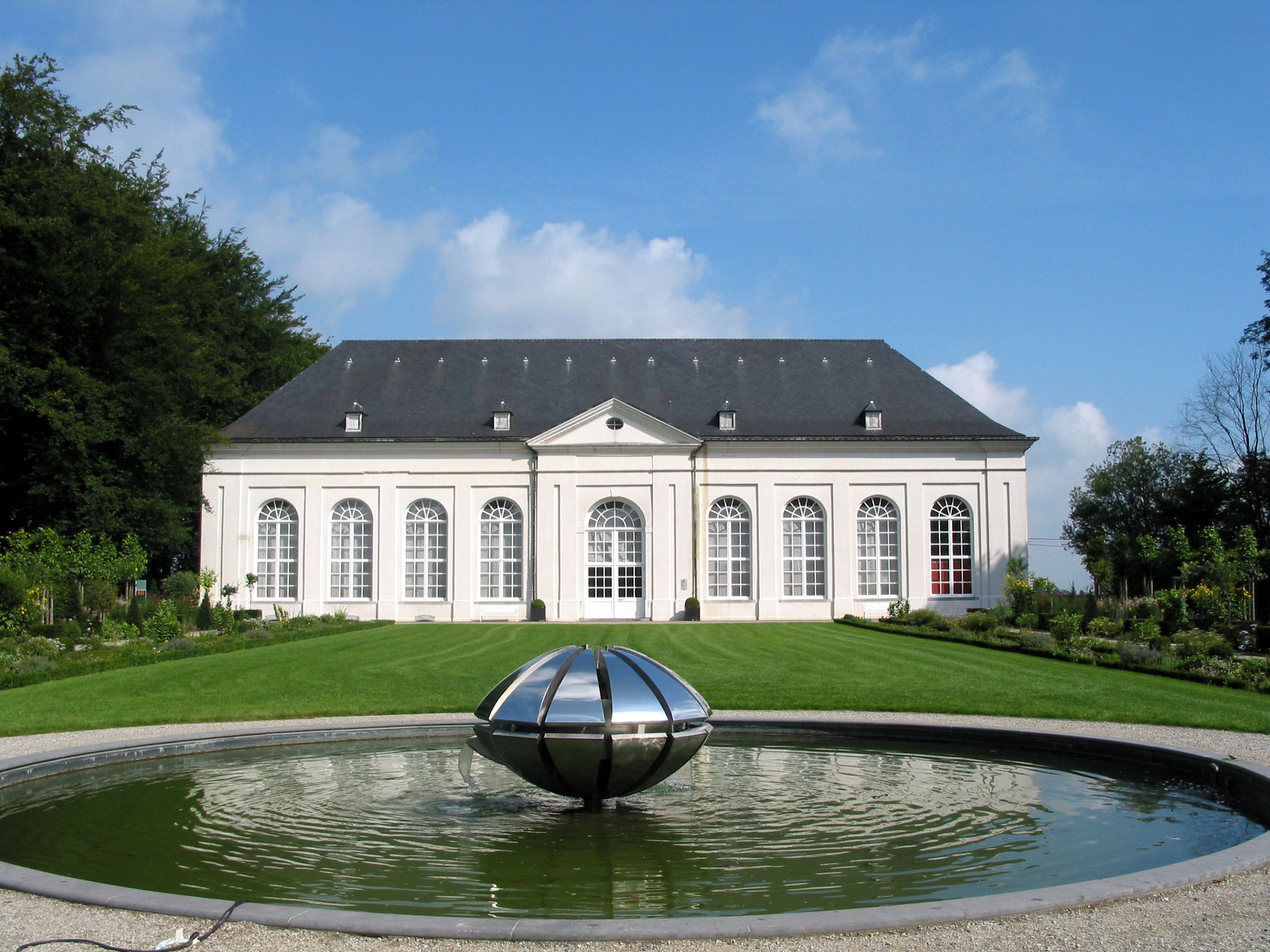
Orangery of the Château de Seneffe

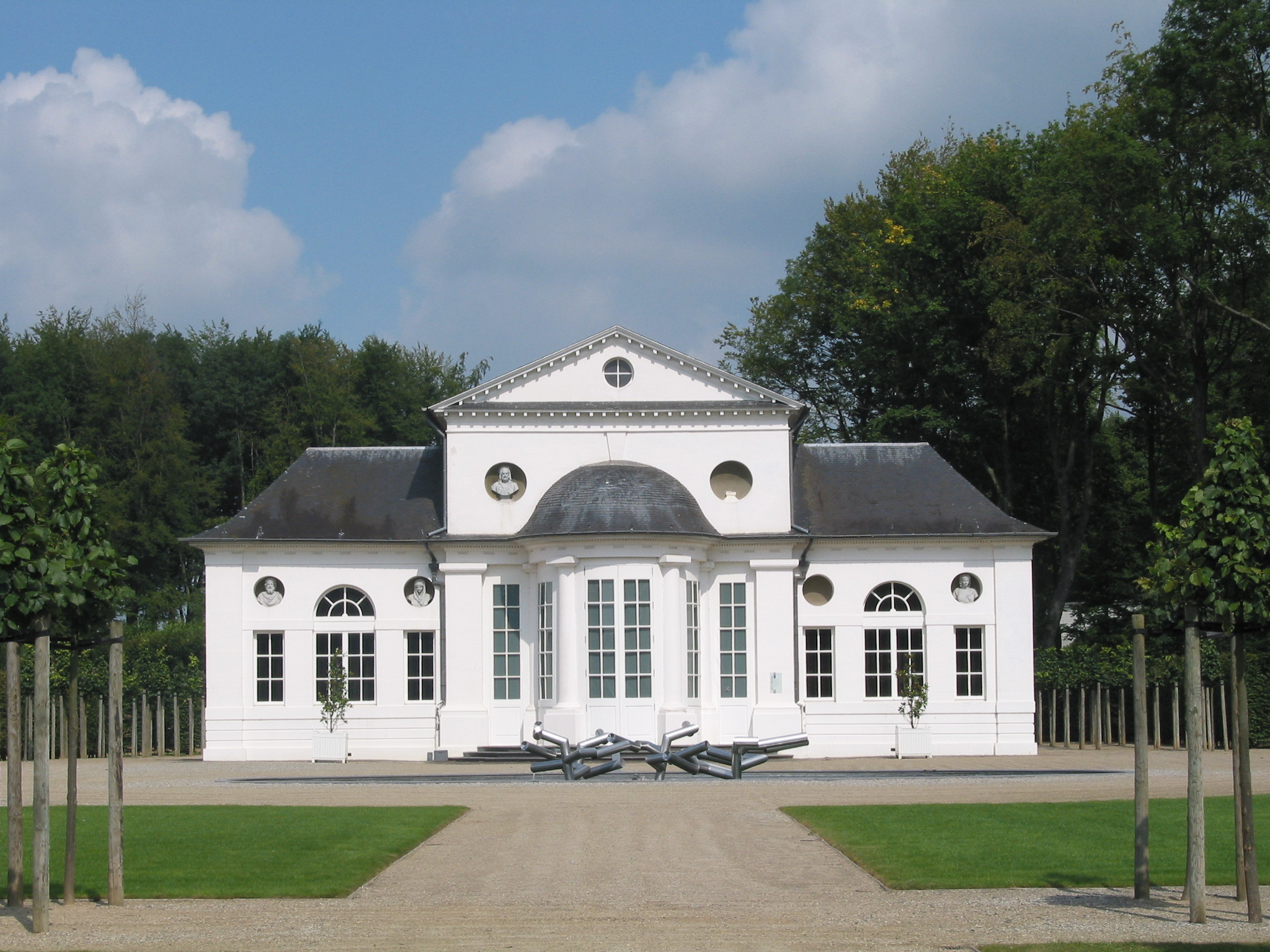
The Theatre today.

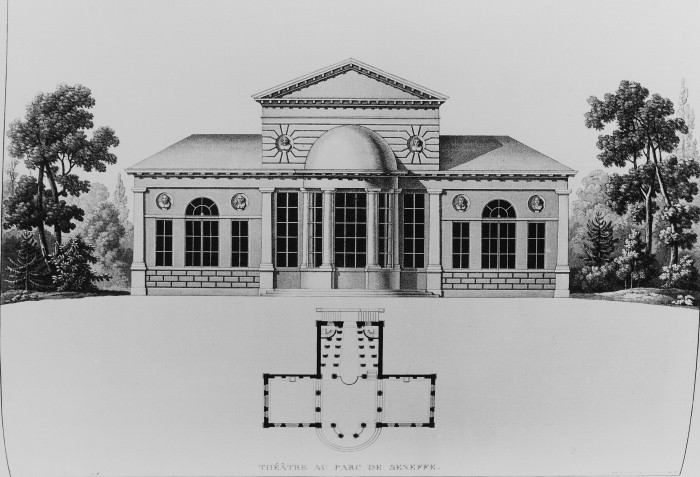
Theatre of the Château de Seneffe, 1779. Elevation and plan.

The park was laid out following the construction of the Château in the 1760s in a formal late baroque French style. The central axis of the alley, the courtyard and the middle bay of the corps de logis is continued in the park. A parterre with a path in the middle was situated directly behind the castle and ended on the banks of a formal pond. Close to the wall surrounding the park an Orangery was built facing the south. This building can still be seen. Northwards, the axis is aligned with the church spire in the village of Seneffe.

In the 1780s part of the park was rearranged as a landscape garden following the English fashion. Numerous small buildings called 'Follies' were built on the grounds such as an island with a temple and a wooden 'cabane'. The most important addition from that time is the neoclassical theatre built by the famous French architect Charles de Wailly. The simple whitewashed building has a stage with a fixed scenery consisting of a gallery in the Tuscan order built as a false perspective. It was the intention of the patron and the architect to revive the classical theatre. The busts in the facades were created by the famous French sculptor Augustin Pajou.

In the 19th century the entire park was rearranged as an English landscape garden. Since 2000 most of the park has been reconstructed in its original 18th-century state.

== See also ==
- Neoclassical architecture in Belgium
- List of castles in Belgium

== Sources ==
- Xavier Duquenne, Le Château de Seneffe, Brussels, 1978.
- Véronique Bücken, Le Château de Seneffe - Centre de l'orfèvrerie de la communauté française, series: Musea Nostra Brussels, 2003 edition.
