= Laurent-Benoît Dewez =

Belgian architect (1731–1812)

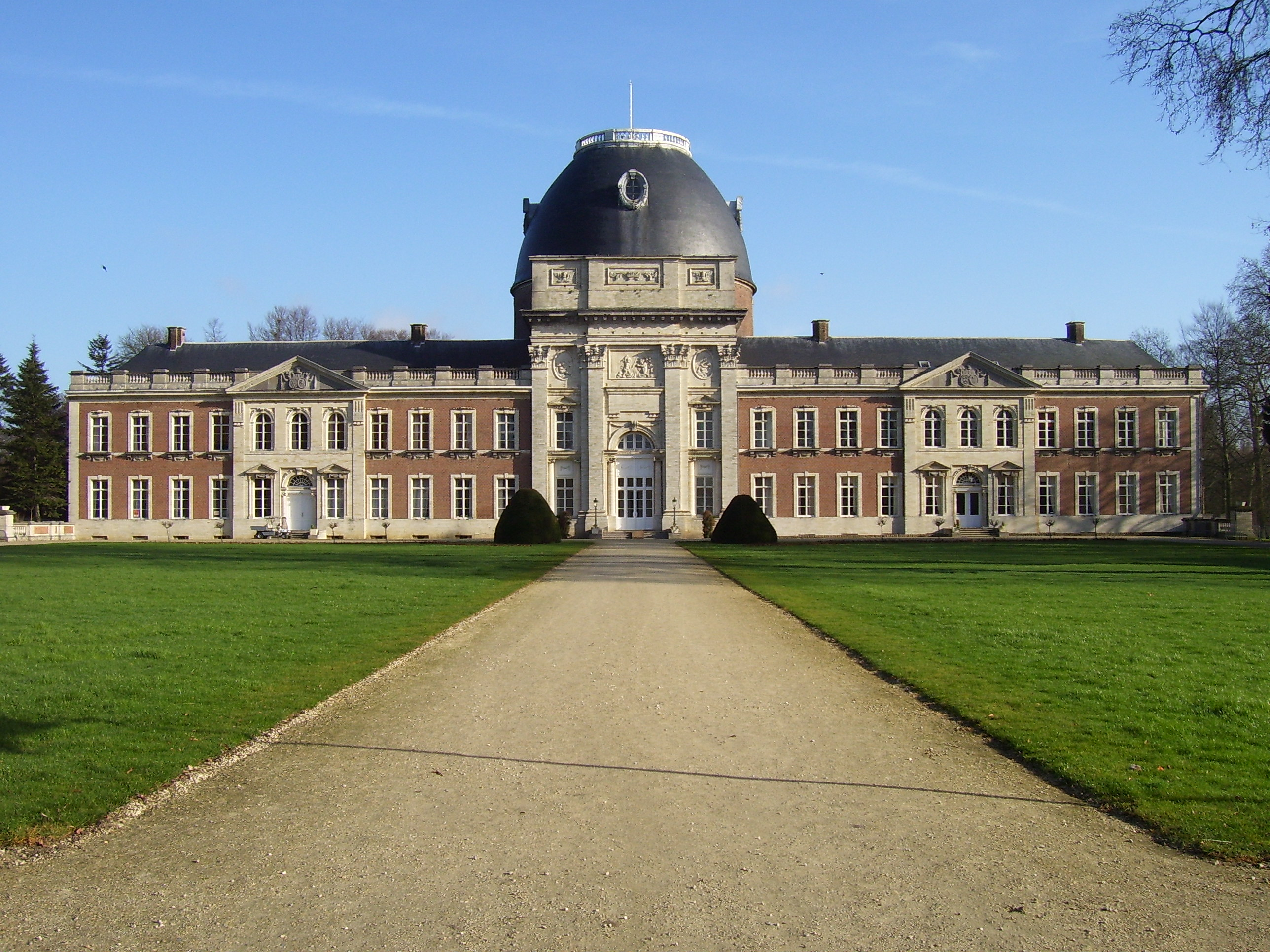
Former Abbey of Opheylissem, Hélécine. The central dome originally housed the Abbey church.

Laurent-Benoît Dewez (14 April 1731 – 1 November 1812) was an architect of Walloon origin. He is considered the most influential architect in the Austrian Netherlands (present-day Belgium) from the second half of the 18th century. His architectural projects are of international stature and introduced a neoclassical style, with Italian and English influences, to the region. He designed a large number of châteaux, abbeys and churches in Belgium, many of which were damaged after the French Revolution.

== Early life ==
Dewez was born in Petit-Rechain near Verviers on 14 April 1731. The abbot of the Abbey of Saint Hubert sent him on a study trip to Italy. There he worked with Luigi Vanvitelli and came into contact with Robert Adam, Giovanni Battista Piranesi, Johann Joachim Winckelmann and Charles-Louis Clérisseau. After a subsequent study trip to Split in the company of Robert Adam he worked briefly as an associate of the Adam brothers in London in 1758. In 1759 he came back to the Austrian Netherlands to start the rebuilding of Abbaye Notre-Dame d'Orval, a work which was never completed.

== Professional life ==
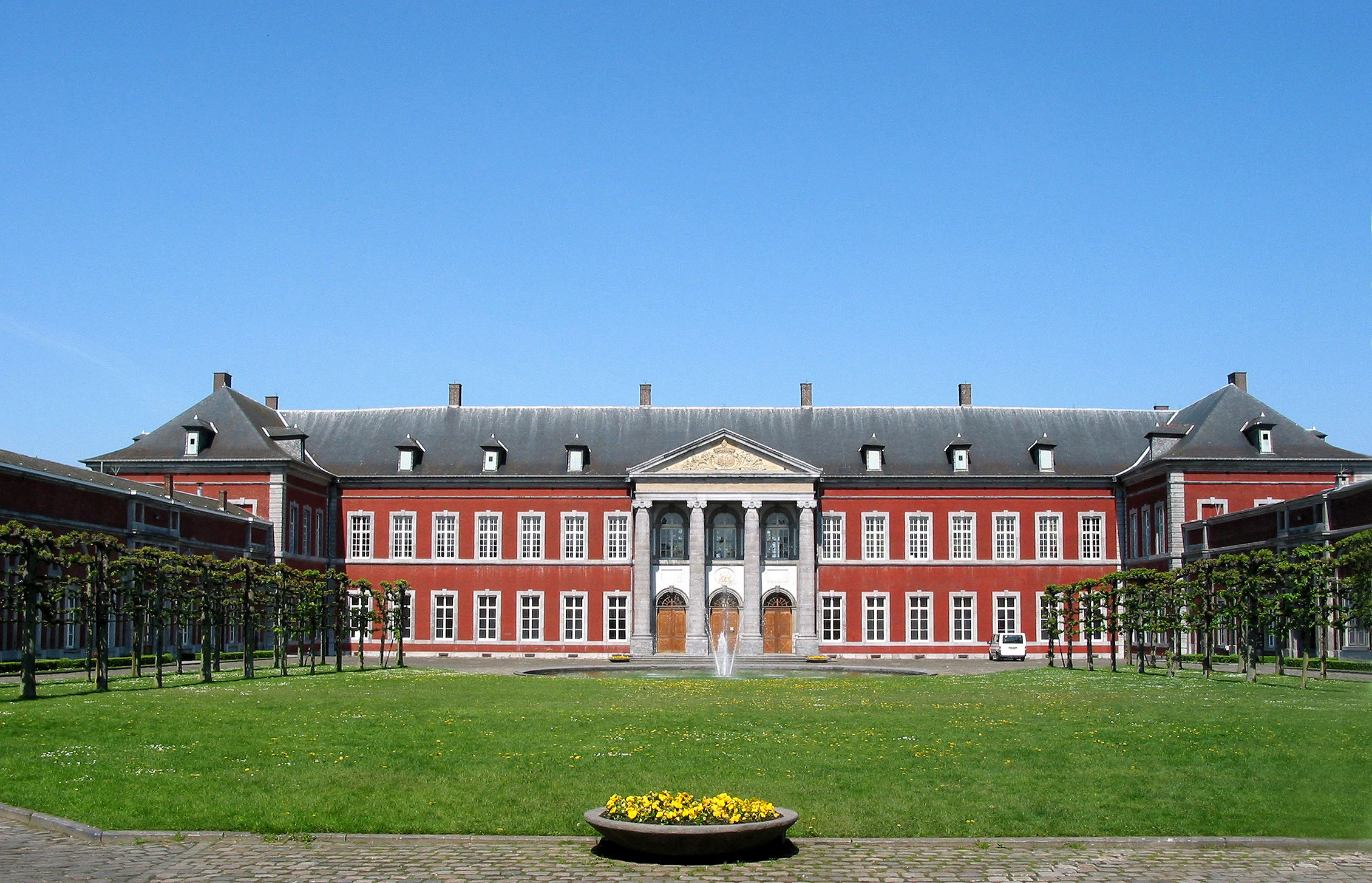
Abbey of Gembloux, Abbot's Palace

In 1760 he settled in Brussels. He mainly worked for abbeys and nobility in the Austrian Netherlands. In 1767 he was appointed court architect to the Governor of the Austrian Netherlands, Charles-Alexandre de Lorraine for whom he reconstructed the Château of Mariemont, which was demolished in the aftermath of the French Revolution. A masterpiece still preserved today is the Château de Seneffe built between 1763 and 1768. His last great project was the new State Prison in Vilvoorde. Dewez's adversaries, envious of his success as court architect, accused him of failures and fraud in the execution of this project. Due to these accusations, he fell into disfavour and was dismissed as court architect. On the invasion of the Austrian Netherlands by French revolutionary troops in 1793, Dewez fled to Prague. In the Czech capital, he designed and built some private mansions for the local bourgeoisie. In 1804 he returned to Belgium. He died relatively impoverished in Groot-Bijgaarden on 1 November 1812. His tombstone with a brief Latin description of his life and work, can still be seen in the exterior wall of the church of Groot-Bijgaarden.

== Buildings designed ==
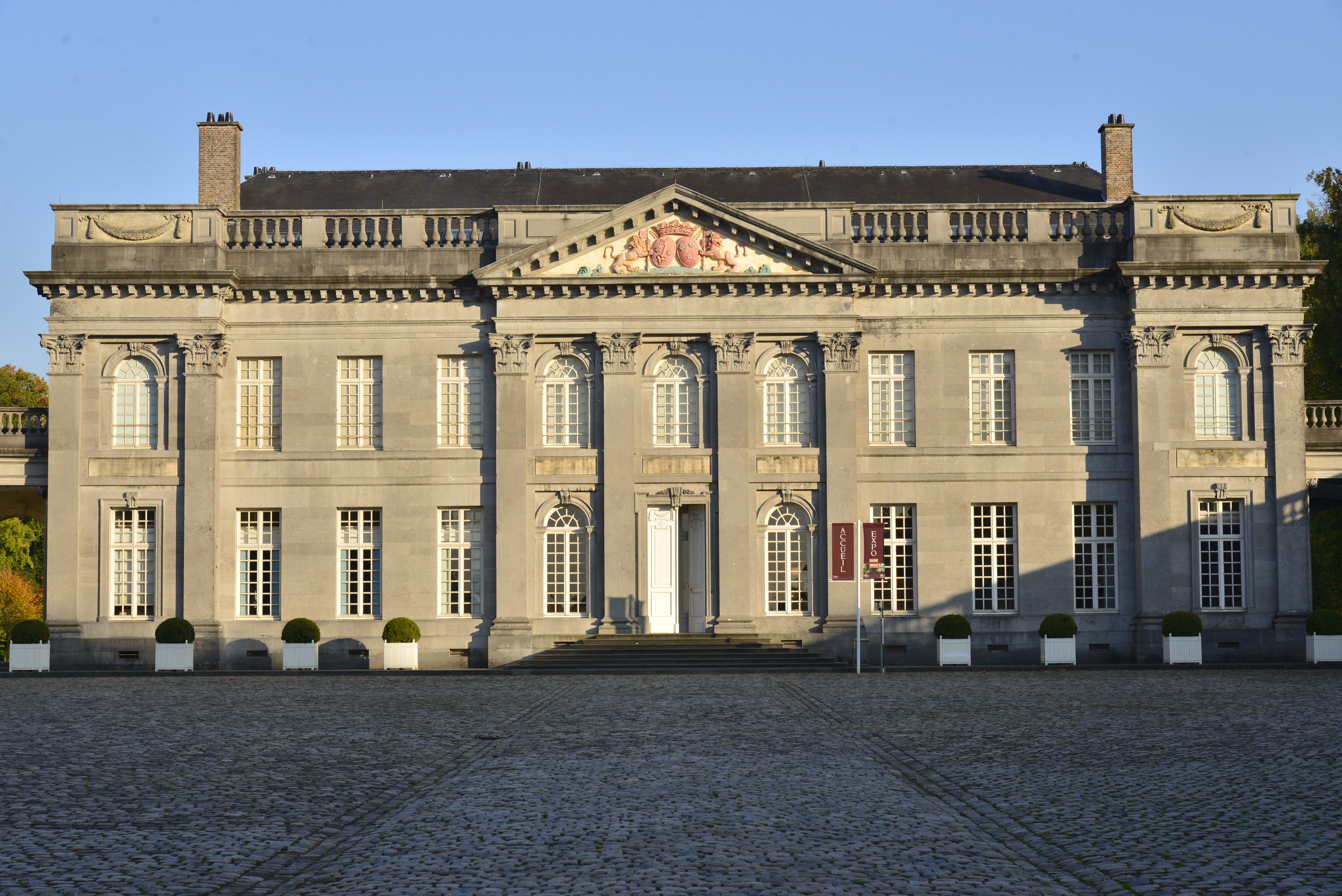
Château de Seneffe

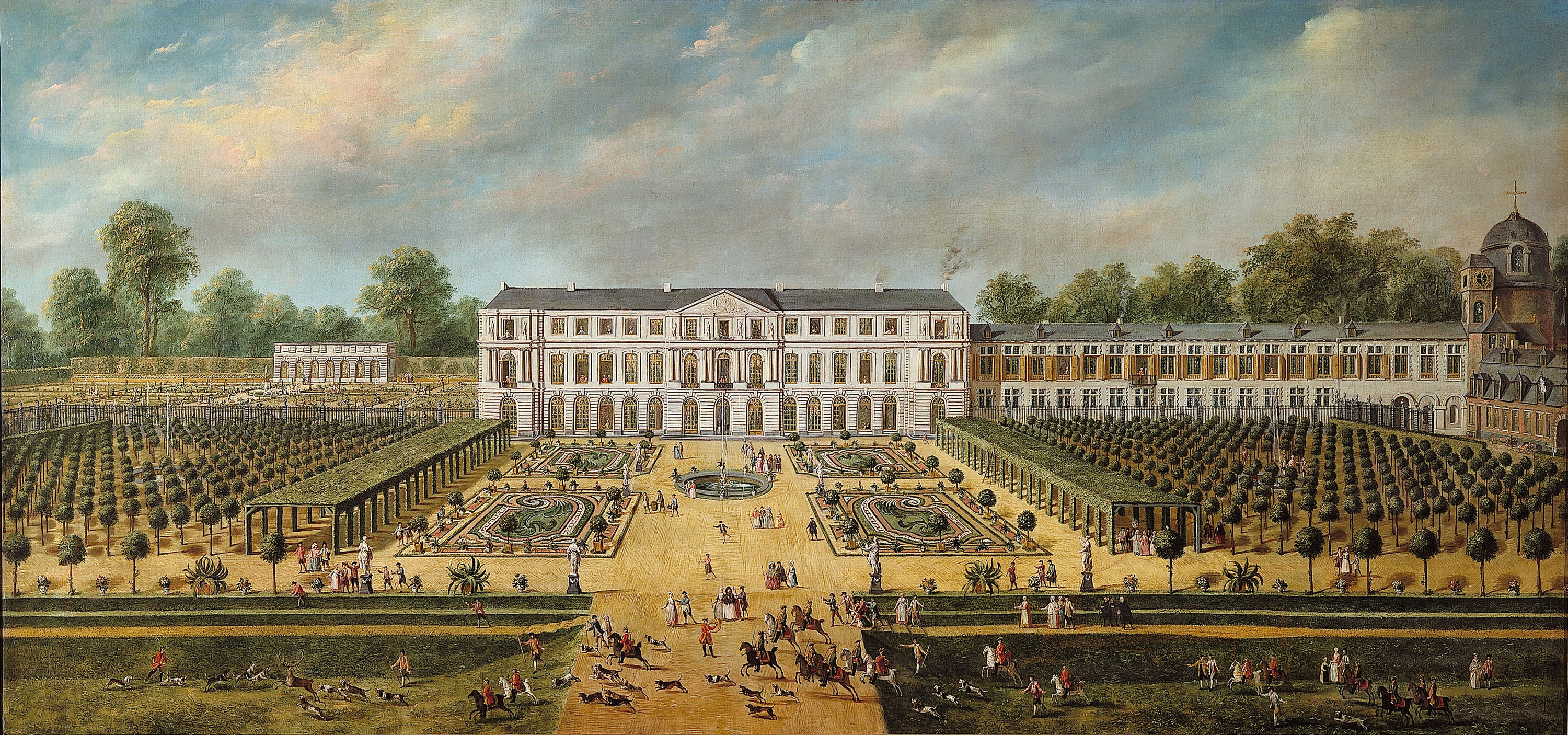
Château of Mariemont

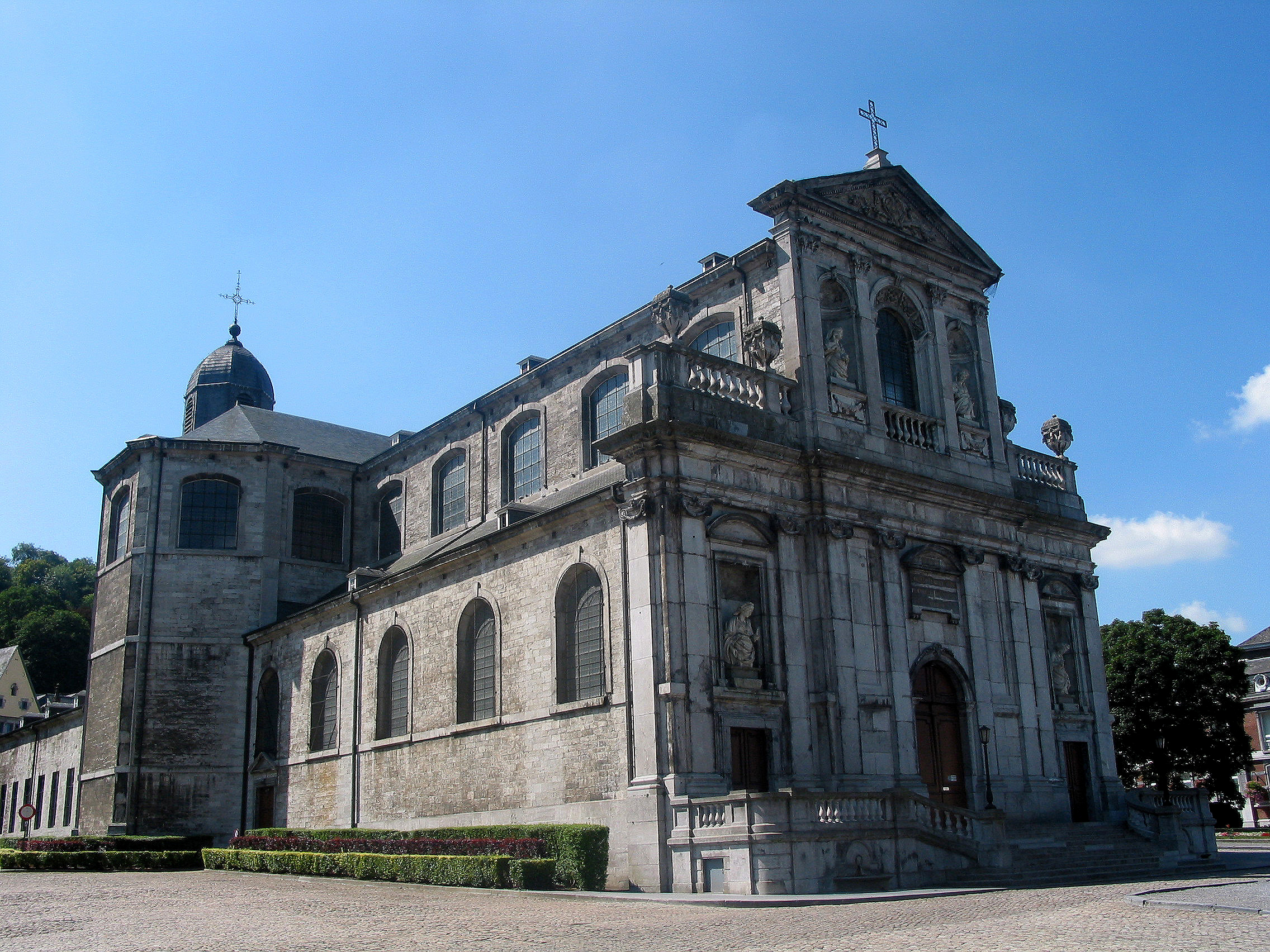
Collegiate Church of Saint Begga

- Abbey of Affligem (demolished)
- Abbaye Notre-Dame d'Orval (demolished)
- Abbey of Dielegem in Jette near Brussels (partly demolished)
- Village church of Bonlez
- Abbey of Forest
- Vlierbeek Abbey
- Abbey of Opheylissem today Hélécine
- Abbey of Gembloux
- Abbot's palace of the Abbey of Tournai, today Hôtel de Ville
- Abbey church of Bonne-Espérance.
- Church of Harelbeke
- Collegiate Church of Saint Begga, Andenne
- Château de Wasseiges (demolished)
- Château de Seneffe
- Château Charles (demolished)
- Château of Mariemont (demolished)
- State Prison of Vilvoorde
- Valduc Abbey (reconstruction; demolished)

== Gallery ==
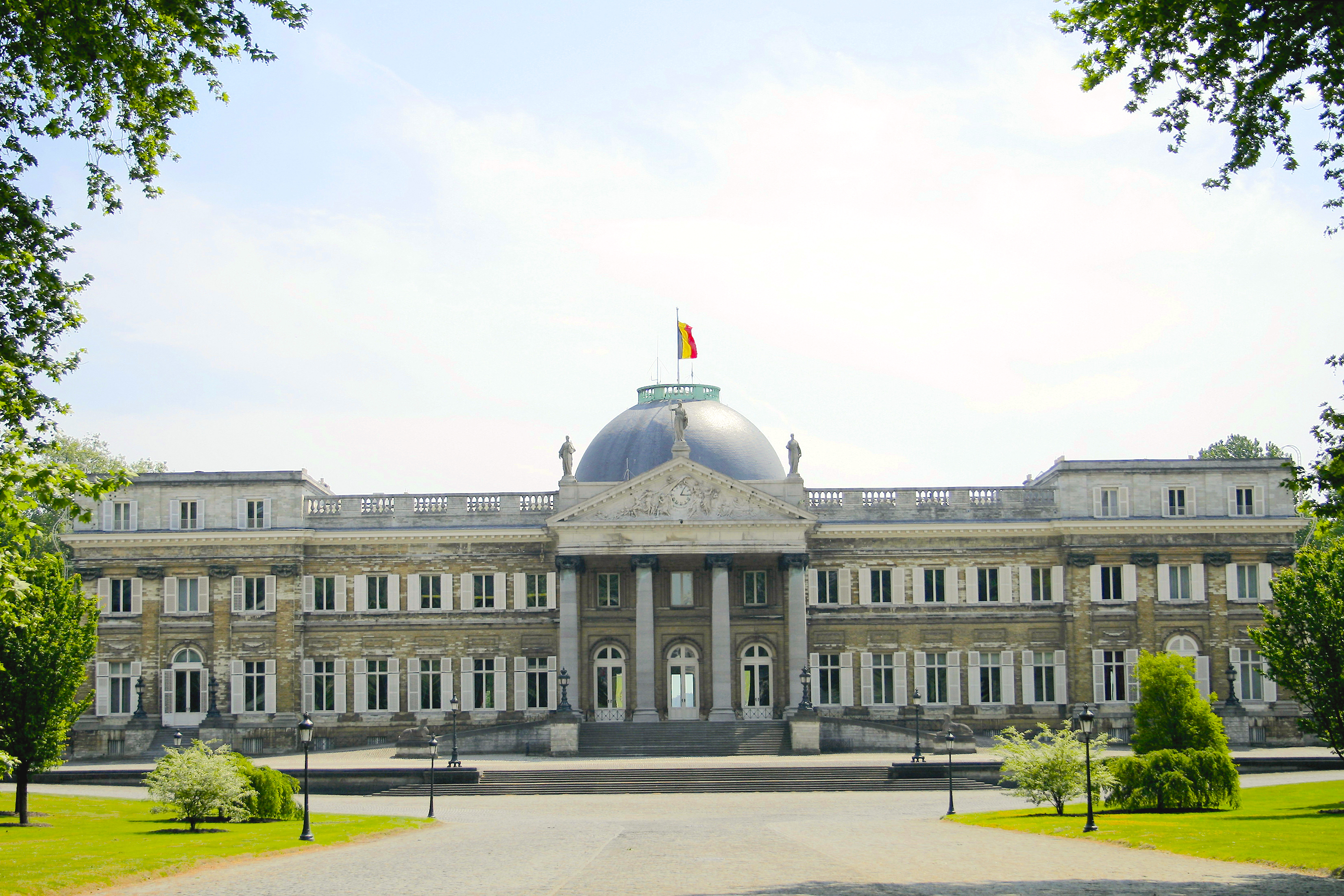
Royal Palace of Laeken

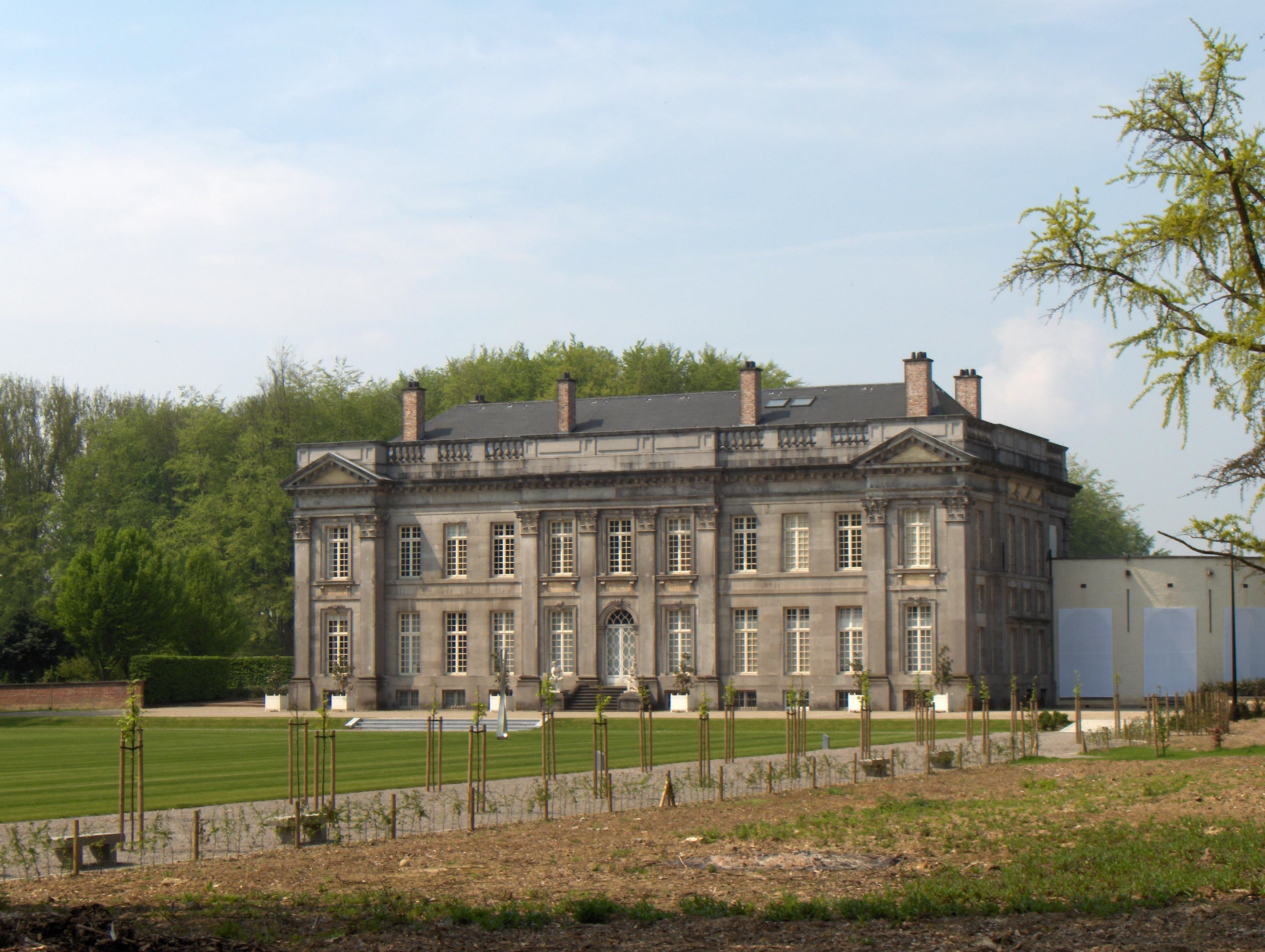
Château de Seneffe, garden side

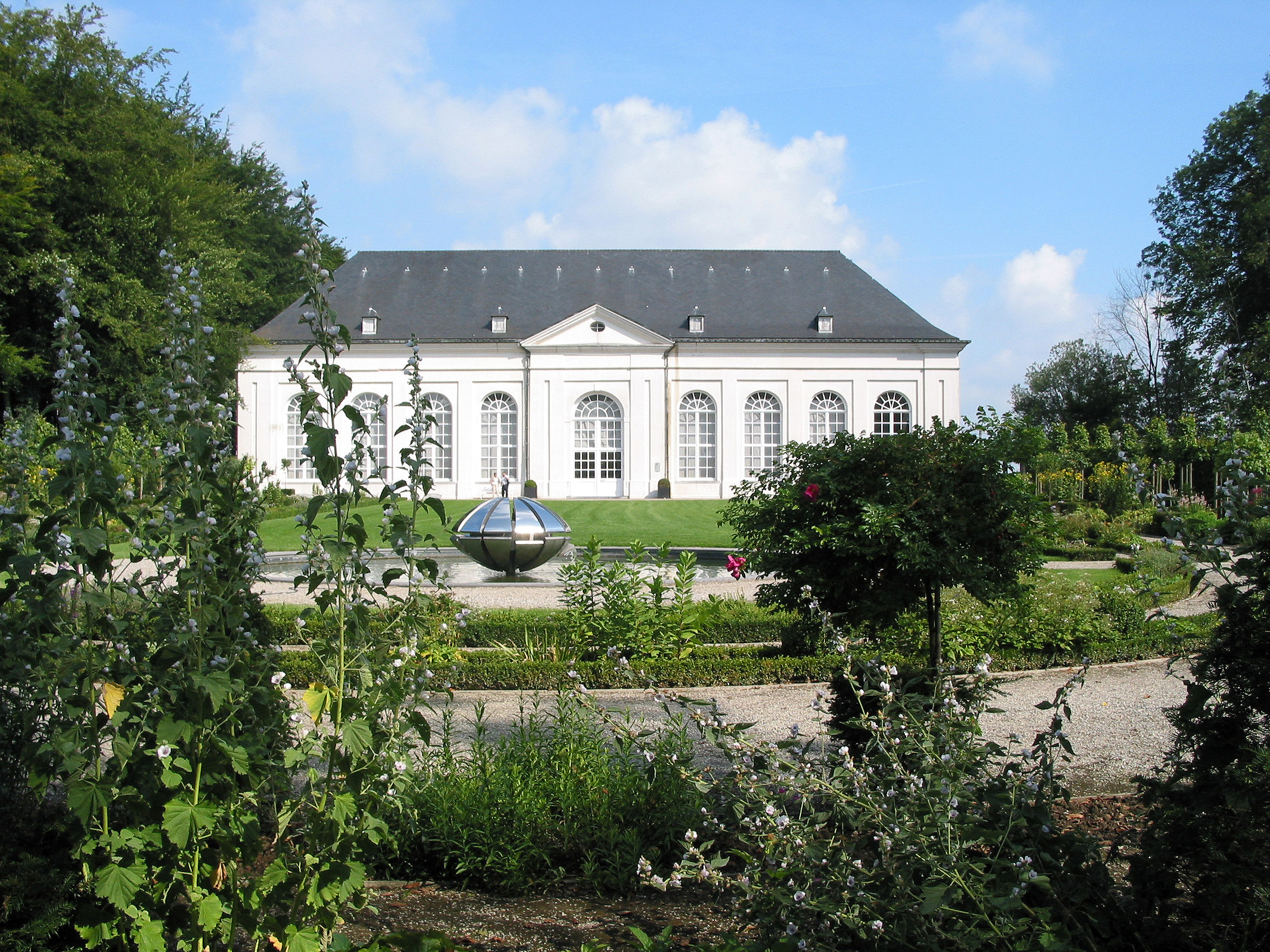
Château de Seneffe, orangery

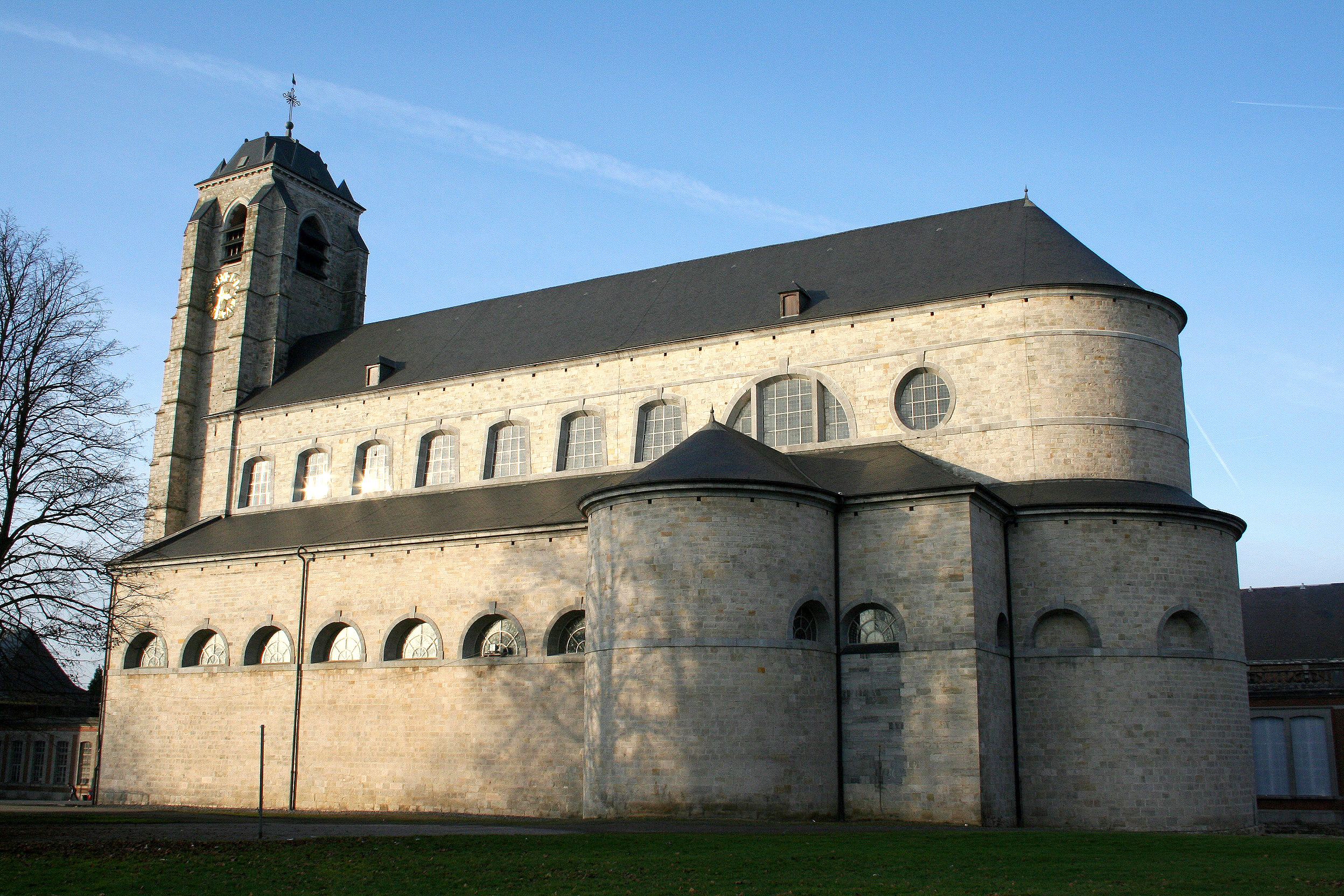
Abbey Church of Bonne-Espérance (with medieval tower)

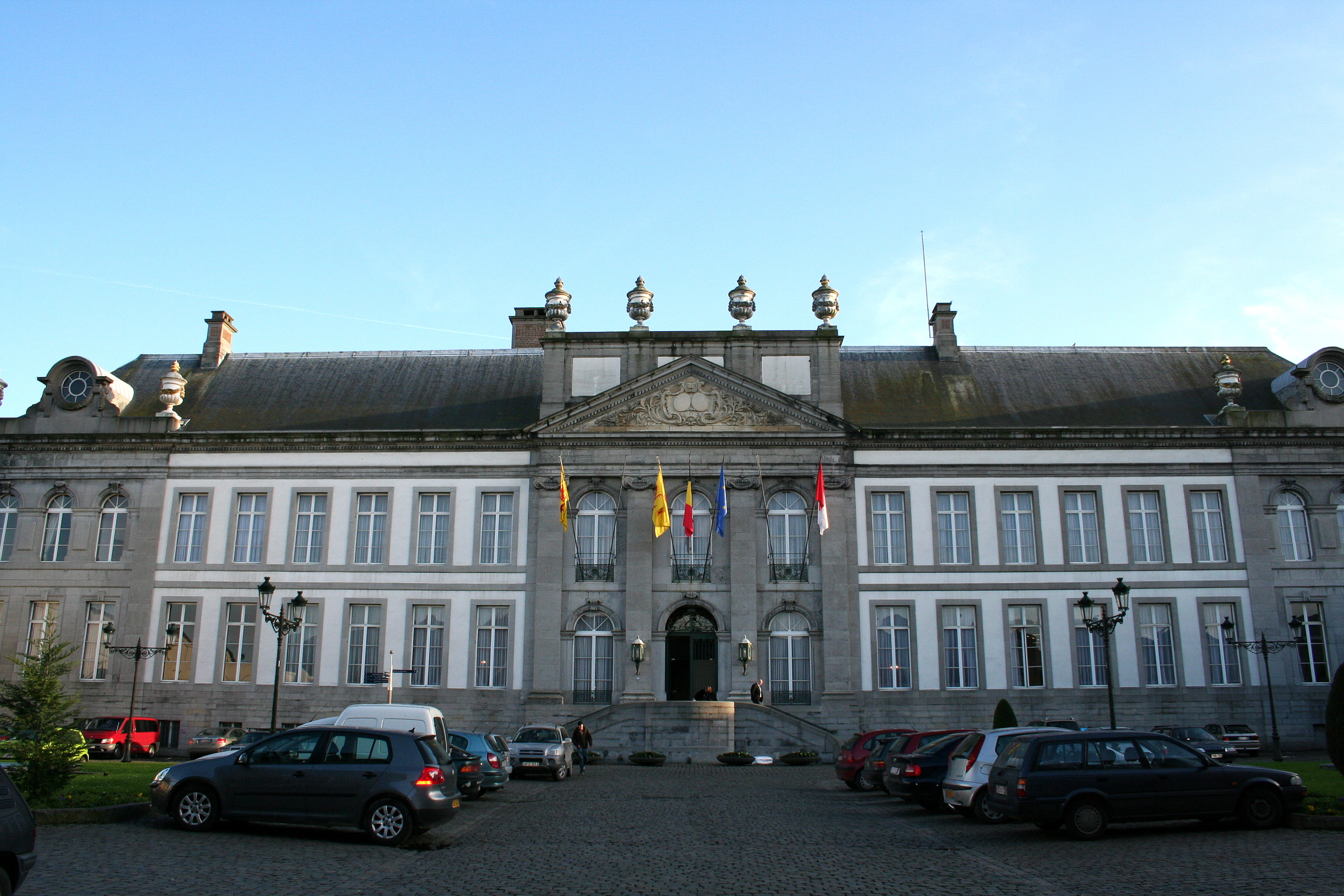
Town hall (former Abbey) of Tournai

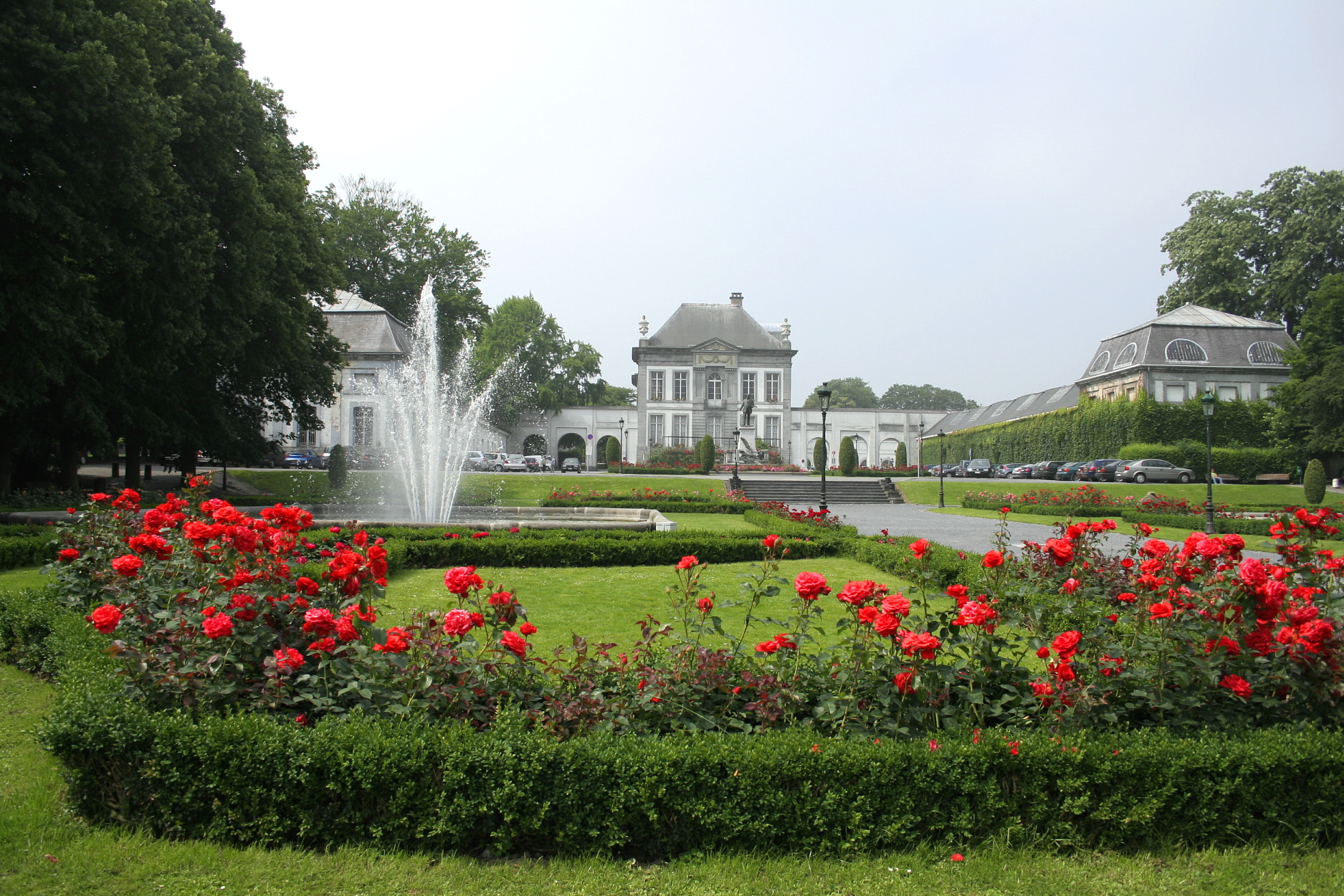
Town hall (former Abbey) of Tournai, garden side

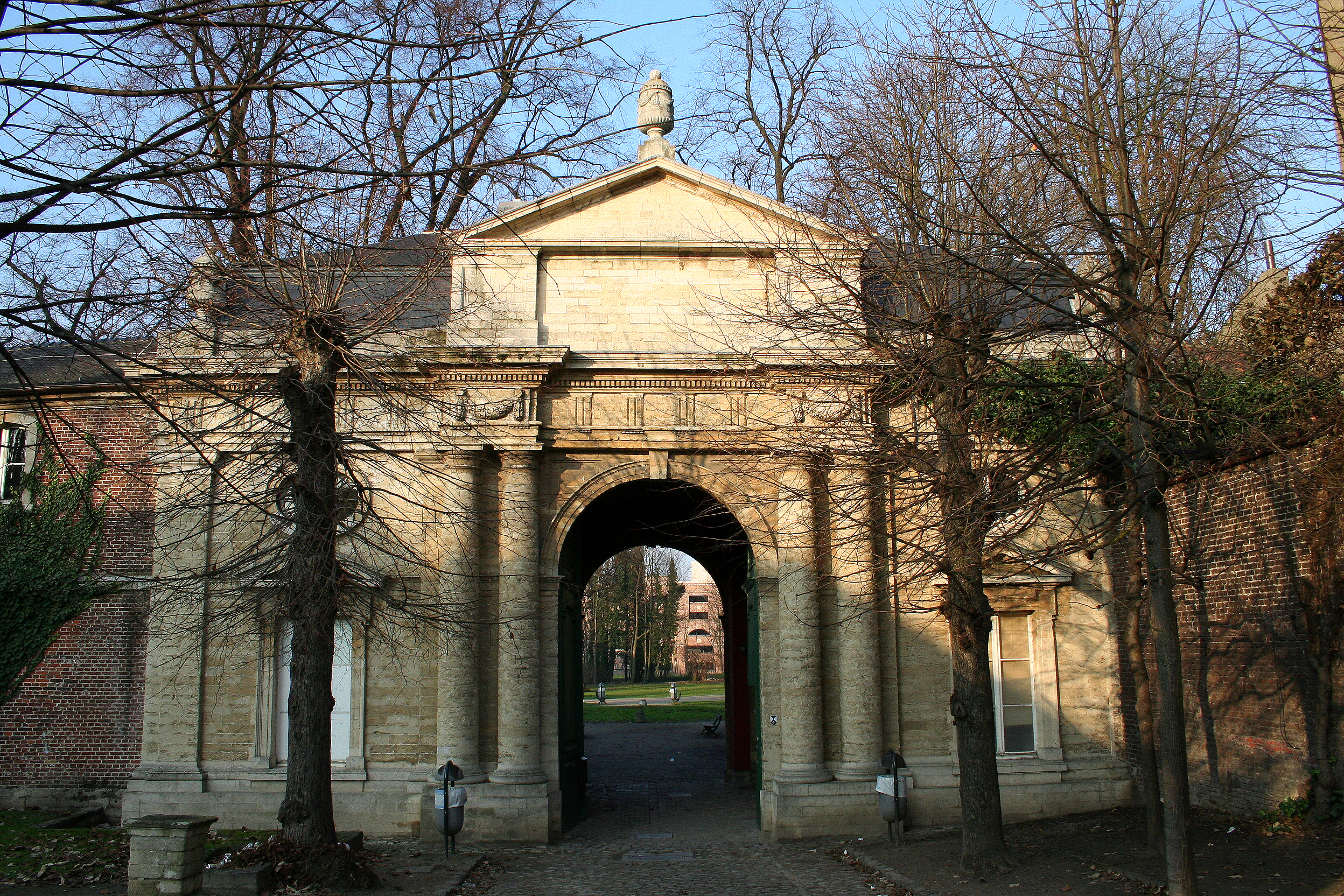
Forest Abbey, entrance gate

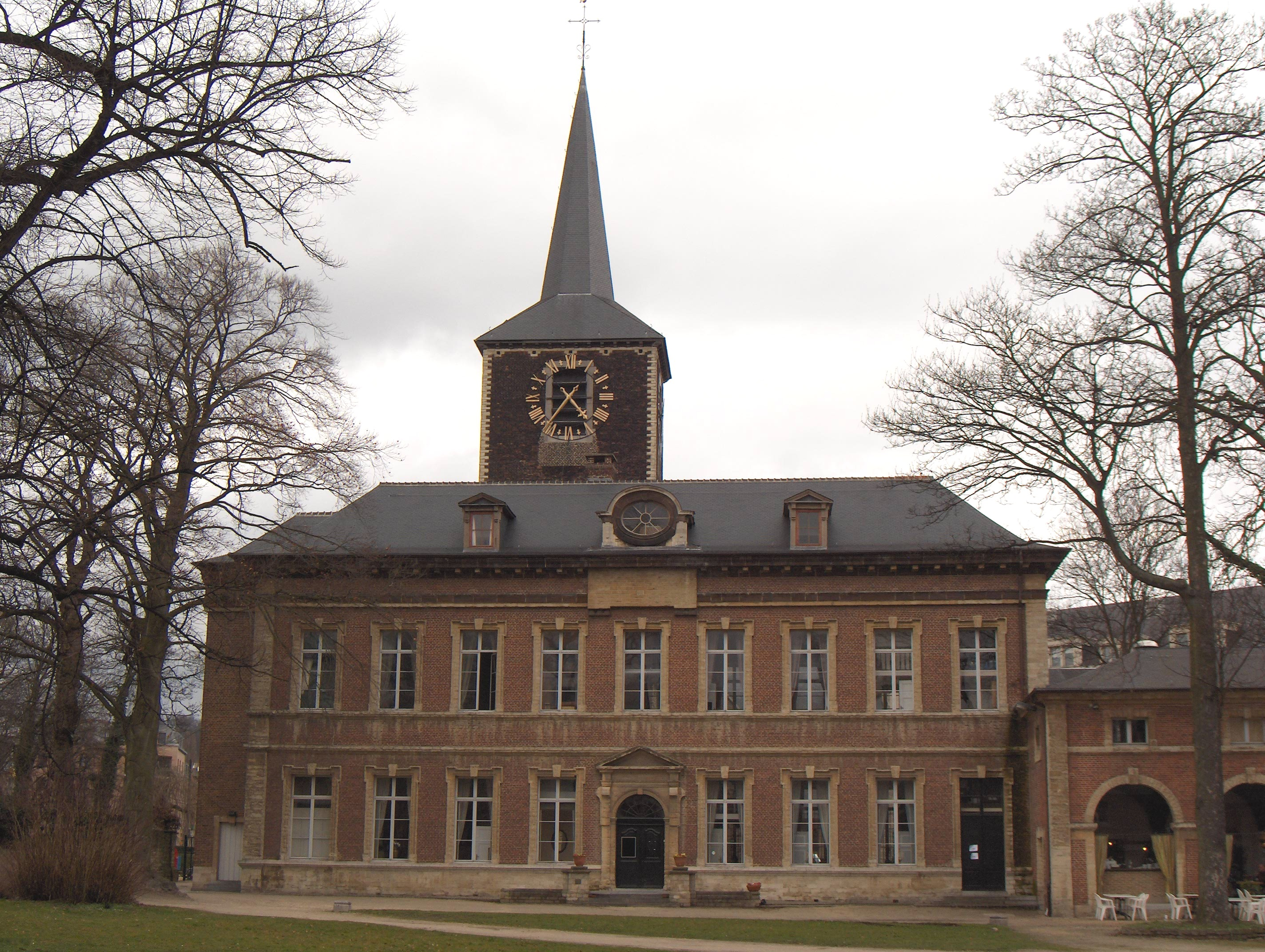
Abbess residence of Forest Abbey

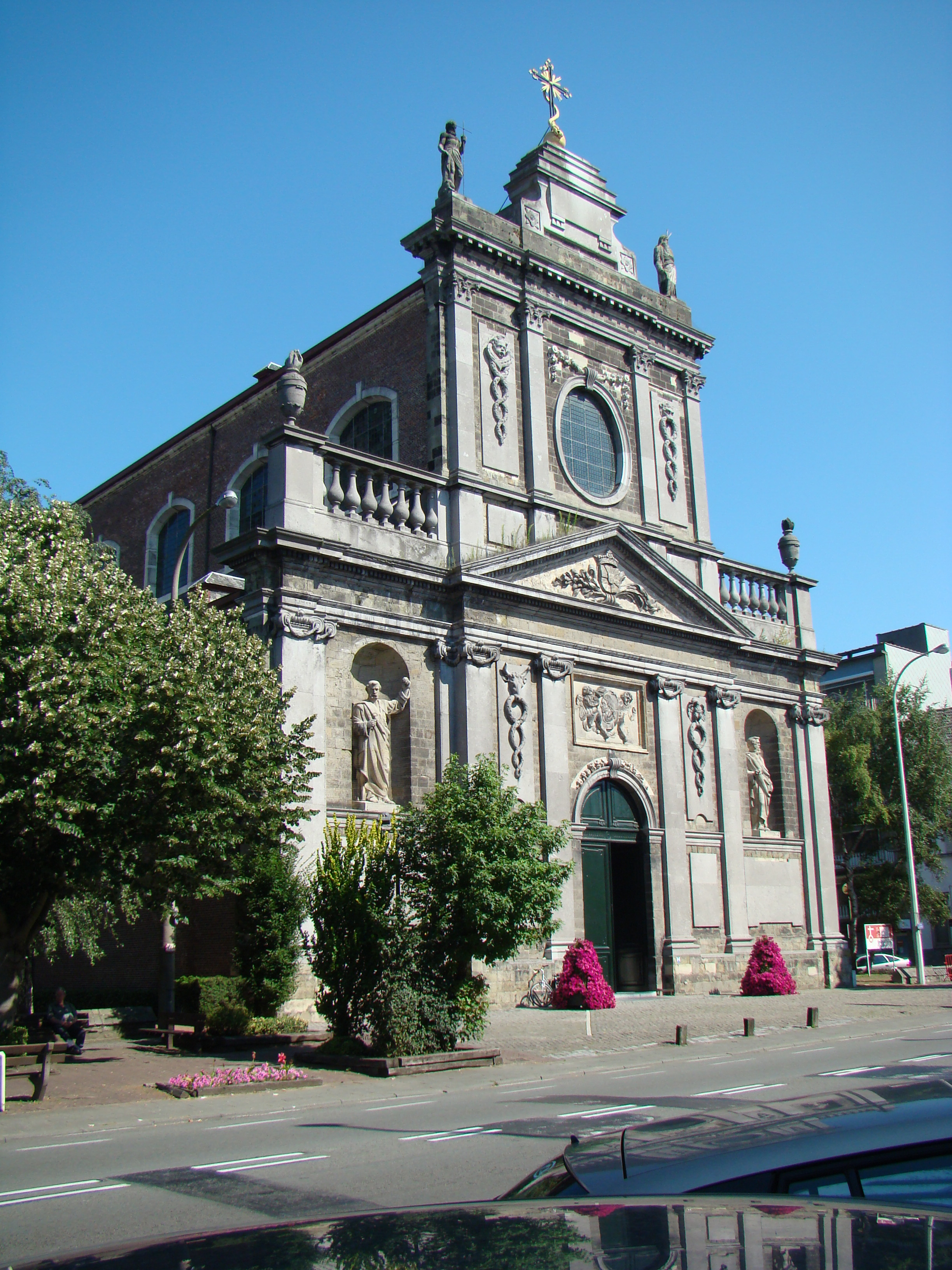
Saint-Salvator Church in Harelbeke

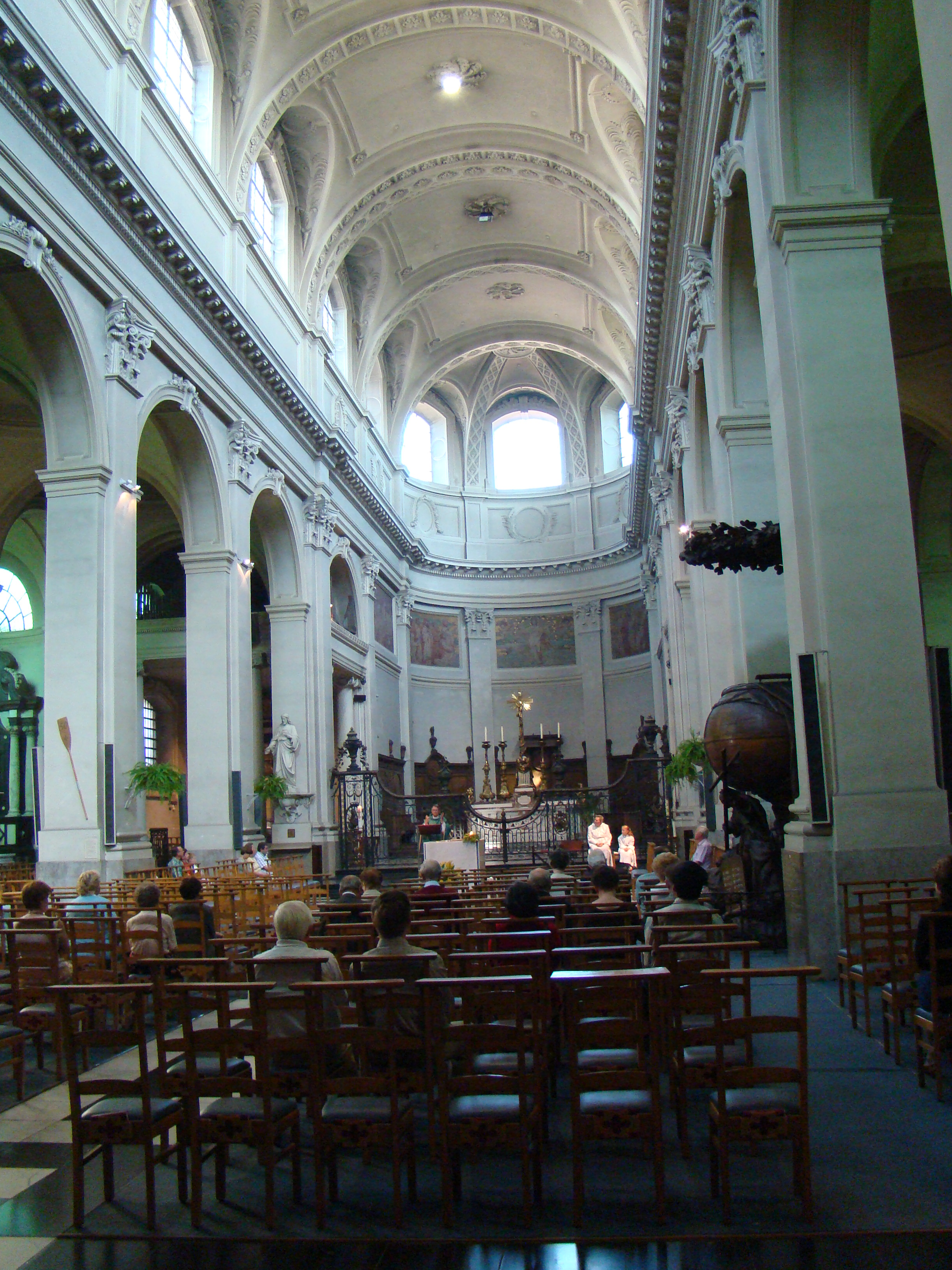
Saint-Salvator Church in Harelbeke, nave

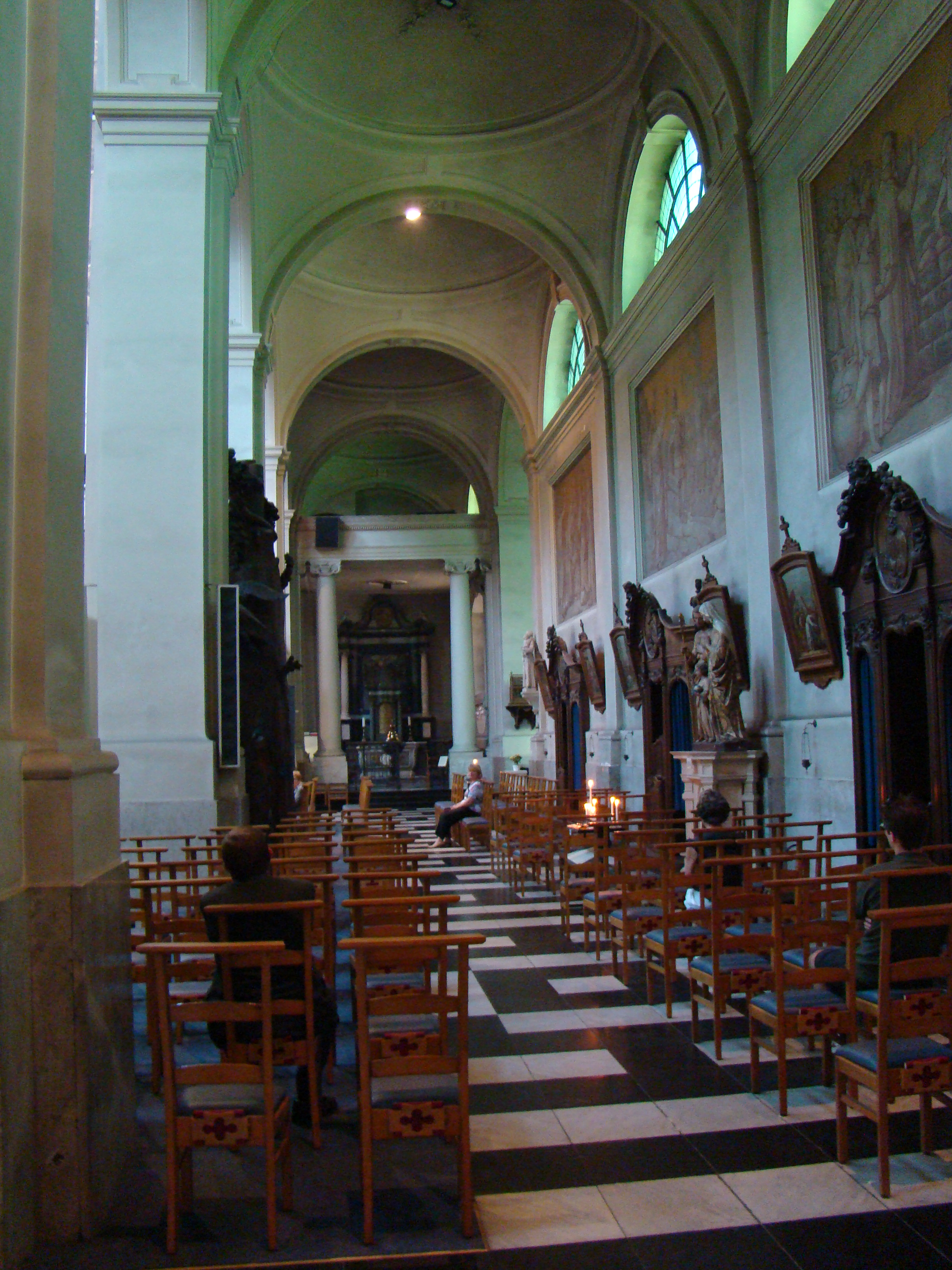
Saint-Salvator Church in Harelbeke, side aisle

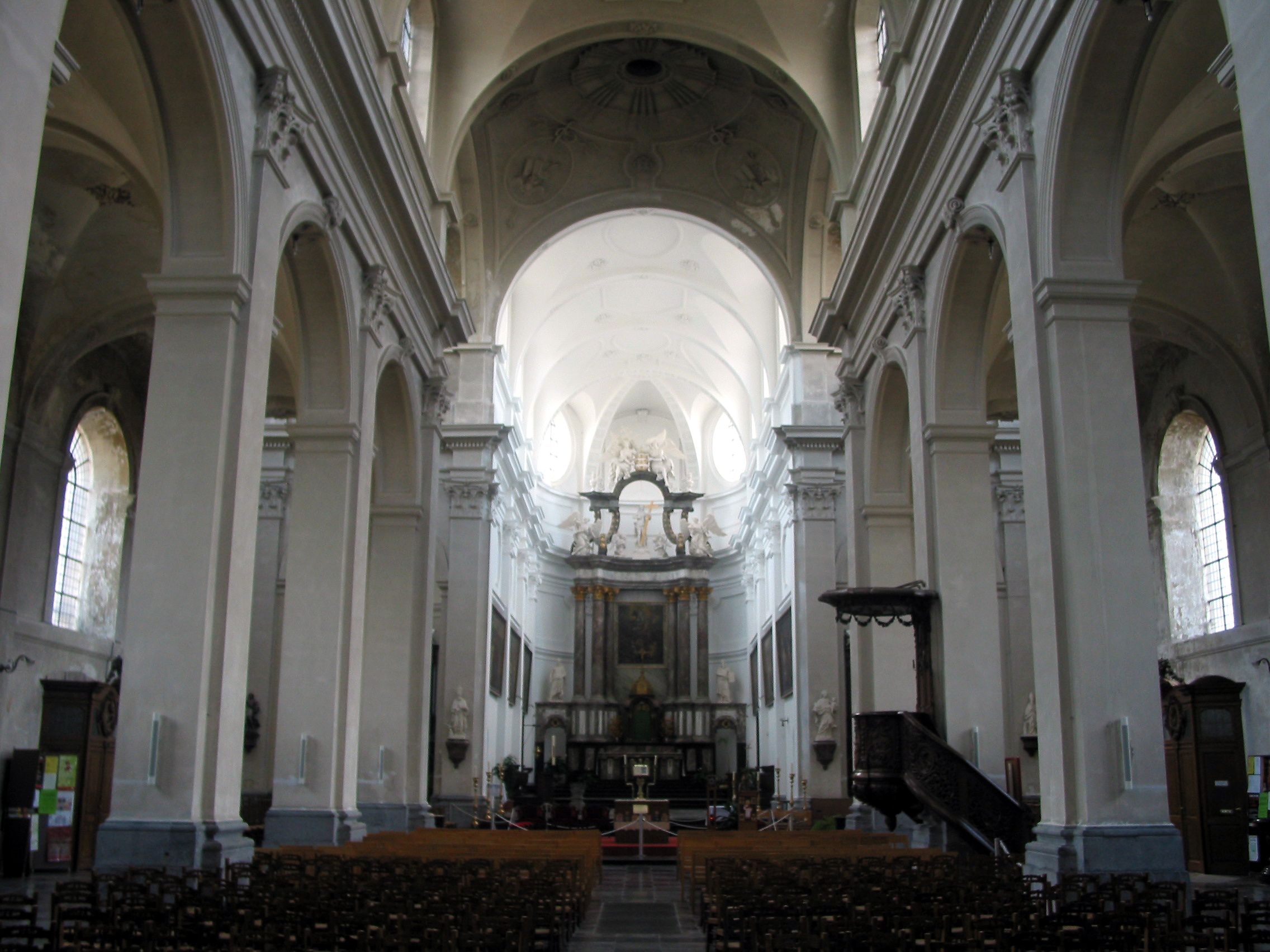
Collegiate Church of Saint Begga, interior

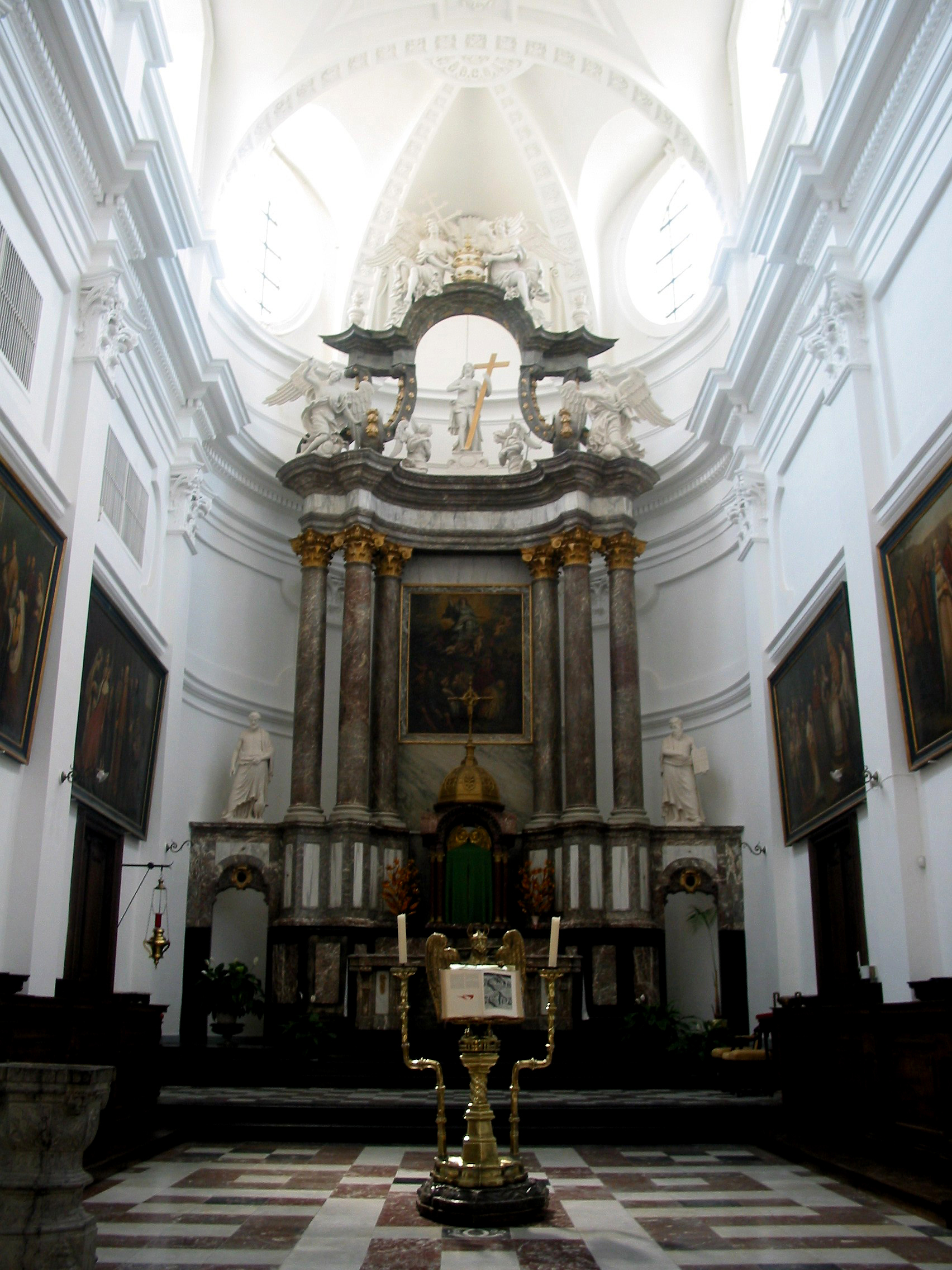
Collegiate Church of Saint Begga, interior
