= European-American Business Organization =

Defunct American consulting firm

European-American Business Organization Inc.
- Type: Private company
- Industry: Consulting
- Founded: 2001
- Founder: Sven C. Oehme
- Defunct: 2024
- Fate: Website closed
- Headquarters: New York City, United States
- Area served: Europe and America
- Products: Market entry consulting, tax advice, helping businesses export
- Services: Venture funding; market expansion; international trade show planning; public relations strategies; legal assistance
- Number of employees: 15-50 (2020)
- Website: www.eabo.biz

European-American Business Organization (EABO) was an American consulting firm specializing in transatlantic business development and international tax services that was based in New York.

It offered a variety of services such as early stage venture funding, market expansion strategy, international trade show planning, public relations strategies, and legal assistance. Its website was closed in mid 2024 and the consultancy no longer appears to be operating.

== History ==
Founder and CEO was former Managing Director of the European American Chamber of Commerce in the United States (until 1998) Sven C. Oehme.

The European Commission appointed EABO's affiliate American Business Forum on Europe (ABFE) as the first Euro Info Correspondence Center (EICC) in the U.S. in 2005.

EABO was part of Enterprise Europe Network (ENN, successor to EICC), a member of the Transatlantic Business Dialogue, and a partner in the US-EU-Match consortium. The US-EU Match consortium was formed in 2008 by NineSigma, Intrasoft International, RTI International, and EABO. The consortium - EEN's exclusive U.S. member - was focused on connecting U.S. organizations to potential European partners in 40 countries.

CEO Sven Oehme was a proponent of the Transatlantic Trade and Investment Partnership (TTIP) and was a frequent speaker in the negotiations before it was terminated in 2018.

By mid 2024, the organizations web site was no longer operational.

== See also ==
- Euro-American relations
- Transatlantic Free Trade Area (TFTA)
