= Transatlantic Business Council =

The Transatlantic Business Council (TABC) is an advocacy group of more than 70 multinational corporations, headquartered in the United States or Europe. A strategic programme within the TABC is the Transatlantic Business Dialogue (TABD). The TABC, with contact offices in Washington, D.C., and Brussels, considers itself the only officially recognized transatlantic voice of business on trade and investment issues.

The Transatlantic Business Council is a regular participant in ad-hoc meetings on trade related issues with the European Commission.

== History ==
The TransAtlantic Business Dialogue (TABD) was established by the US government and European Union in 1995 as the official business sector advisory group for EU and US officials on trade and investment issues. The purpose of the TABD was to foster an ongoing dialogue between business and government at the highest levels. It had become clear to both governments that international business maintains a unique and indispensable perspective on trade liberalization, and that it was necessary to create an official forum that allowed these transatlantic businesses to come together in a single setting where they would be able to address their mutual concerns.

=== Meetings and conferences ===
The first TABD conference was held in Seville, Spain in 1995 and concluded in the creation of working groups on standards and regulatory issues, trade liberalization, investment, and third country relations. As it was the first time that the private sector held an official role in determining EU/US public policy, the Seville conference signified a milestone in transatlantic trade relations. US Secretary of Commerce Ronald Brown convened the conference along with European Commission Vice President Sir Leon Brittan and Commissioner Dr. Martin Bangemann, and it was met with enthusiasm across the transatlantic business community.

The last TABD program meeting took place in January in Davos/Switzerland in the margins of the World Economic Forum. Government guests and speakers included Irish Prime Minister Enda Kenny, OECD Secretary General Ángel Gurría and Michael Froman, Assistant to President Barack Obama and US Deputy National Security Advisor for International Economic Affairs.

=== Founding of the TABC ===
The TABC was founded 1 January 2013, in a merger of the existing Transatlantic Business Dialogue (1995) and the European-American Business Council (EABC), founded in 1997 as the successor of the European Community Chamber of Commerce in the United States.

== Transatlantic Business Dialogue (TABD) ==
With the founding of the Transatlantic Business Council ion 2013, the Dialogue has been reshaped as a programme within the TABC. The TABD program is the highest forum within the TBC and brings together European and American CEOs and C-suite executives. The TABD meets twice a year, leading to the development of joint policy recommendations to the US and European governments on a number of trade-related issues.

The TABD continually provides input on a number of trade issues, including financial services, raw materials/recycling, and eMobility. Since 2007, the Transatlantic Economic Council (TEC), which is the primary plenary for economic dialogue between the US and EU, has served as an additional platform for the TABD to exercise its advisory role.

TABD's ultimate goal has always been to facilitate the eventual establishment of a barrier-free transatlantic market, which would further global trade liberalization. Consequently, the launch of free trade negotiations between the US and EU exemplifies TABD's efforts, and places the program in an attractive position vis-à-vis the negotiators.

== Members ==
The list of TABC Member Companies includes a number of important multinational corporations:

- AIG
- Applied Materials
- ASTM
- AT&T
- Audi AG
- BASF
- BBVA
- BDO
- British American Tobacco
- BT
- Chevron Corporation
- Cisco Systems
- Cognizant
- Covidien
- Covington & Burling LLP
- Deloitte
- Deutsche Bank
- Deutsche Telekom
- European-American Business Organization Inc. (EABO)
- Electrolux
- Ericsson
- Expander Business Consulting
- Experian
- Exxon Mobil Corporation
- Ernst & Young (EY)
- Ford Motor Company
- Fragomen, Del Rey, Bernsen & Loewy
- Grant Thornton
- Heitkamp & Thumann Group
- Hogan Lovells
- Intel
- Johnson Controls
- K&L Gates LLP
- KPMG
- Kreab
- Lilly
- Merck & Co., Inc.
- NASDAQ
- NCR
- Oracle
- Pfizer
- Philip Morris International
- PwC
- Qualcomm
- Red Hat
- Saab Group
- SAP
- Siemens
- SKF
- Statoil
- Telecom Italia
- Telefónica
- Texas Instruments
- Umicore
- Underwriters Laboratories
- Verisign
- Verizon
- Wärtsilä Corporation

== Controversy ==
According to consumer rights advocacy group and think tank Public Citizen,

TABD makes countless smaller suggestions that are geared toward removing important worker, consumer and environmental laws and regulations which it views as "barriers to trade," and which everyone else views as measures that save lives, keep our air and water clean, and protect endangered animals and plants.

== See also ==
- Euro-American relations
- Transatlantic Free Trade Area (TFTA)
- Transatlantic Trade and Investment Partnership (TTIP)
