= European Union–United States relations =

United States–European Union relations

- European Union: United States

Diplomatic mission
- European Union Delegation, Washington, D.C.: United States Mission, Brussels

Envoy
- Ambassador Jovita Neliupšienė: Ambassador Andrew Puzder

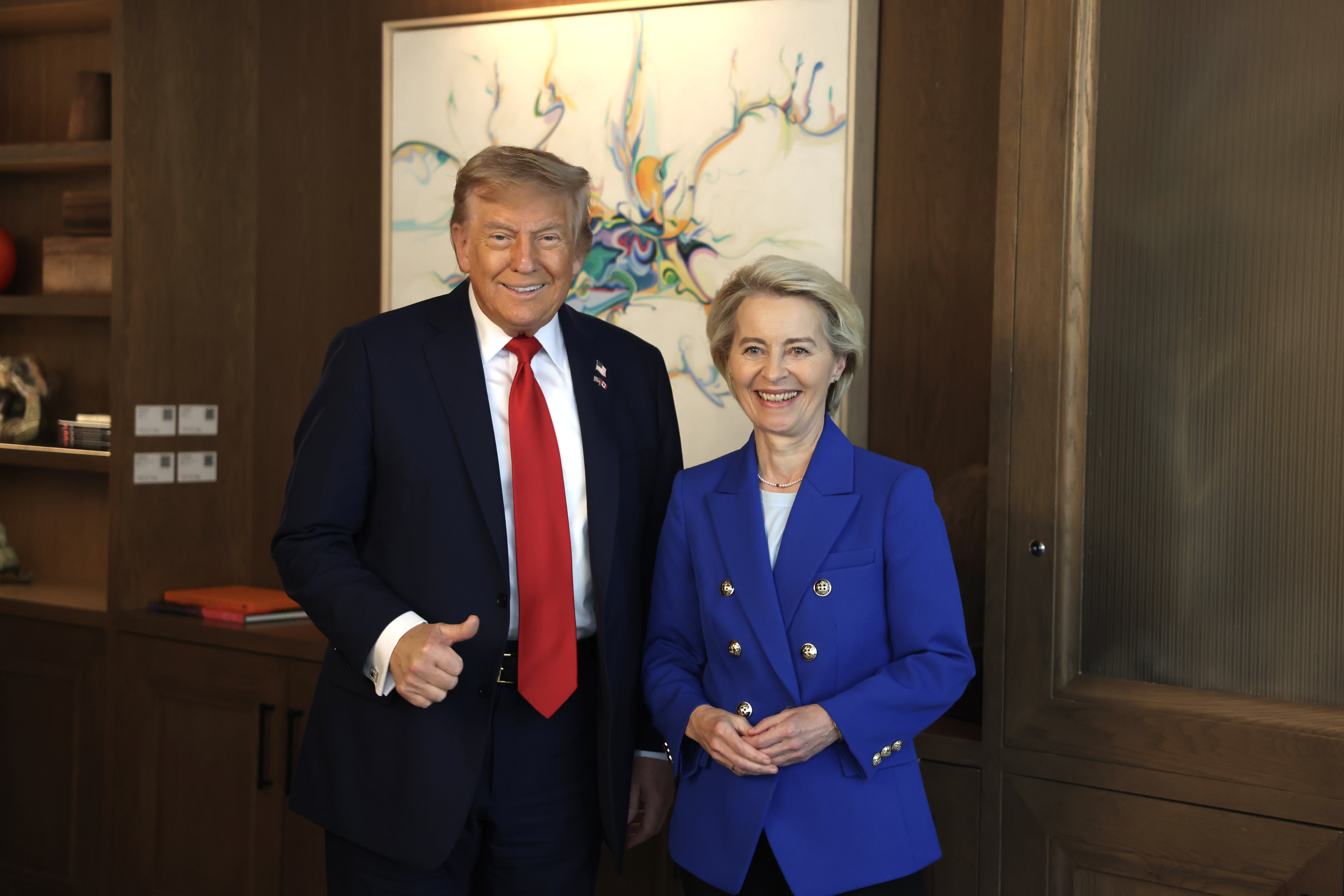
President of the European Commission Ursula von der Leyen with U.S. President Donald Trump on 51st G7 summit in Kananaskis, Canada, June 16, 2025

The United States and the European Union began formal relations in 1953, when U.S. diplomats visited the European Coal and Steel Community (the EU precursor, created in 1951) in addition to the national governments of its six founding countries (Belgium, France, Italy, Luxembourg, the Netherlands, and West Germany, part of present-day Germany). The two parties have historically shared a good relationship strengthened by a military cooperation within NATO, cooperation on trade, and their common values. However, since the 1960s, there have been many long-running and ongoing disputes over economy, foreign policy, and domestic policy/laws.

The relationship has severely deteriorated since the beginning of 2025 with the reelection of Donald Trump as U.S. President, his embrace of the "America First" policy and the conflict over the Russian invasion of Ukraine following President Trump's efforts to redirect US support away from Ukraine in favor of Russia and Vladimir Putin. Moreover, Trump's imposition of heavy tariffs for EU products and his threats against an EU member's sovereignty has led to concerns in the EU over rising protectionism and the potential impact on transatlantic economic ties. Both sides have engaged in ongoing negotiations, aiming to avoid escalation while preserving a stable trading relationship.

== History ==
=== Establishing diplomatic relations ===
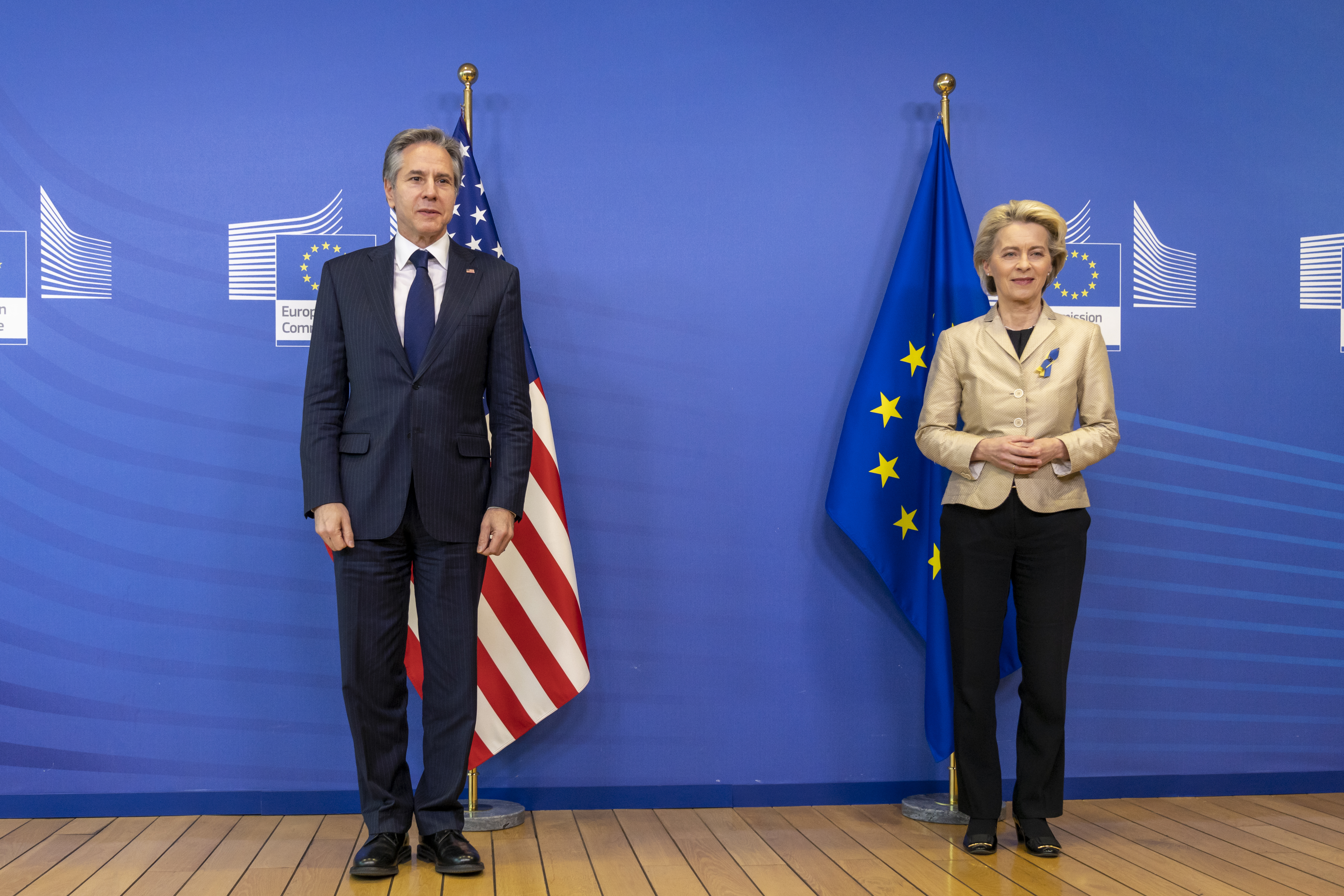
United States Secretary of State Antony Blinken meets with President of the European Commission Ursula von der Leyen on 4 March 2022 in Brussels, Belgium.

Diplomatic relations between the U.S. and the European Community were initiated in 1953 when the first U.S. observers were sent to the European Coal and Steel Community. The U.S. Mission to the ECSC formally opened in Luxembourg in 1956. The Delegation of the European Commission to the United States in Washington, D.C. was established in 1954, and the United States Mission to the European Communities, now the United States Mission to the European Union, was established in 1961 in Brussels. On November 25, 2003, the U.S. and the EU celebrated 50 years of diplomatic ties.

=== Formalized cooperation ===
In 1990, the relations of the U.S. with the European Community were formalized by the adoption of the Transatlantic Declaration. A regular political dialogue between the U.S. and the EC was thereby initiated at various levels, including regular summit meetings. The cooperation focused on the areas of economy, education, science and culture.The New Transatlantic Agenda (NTA), which was launched at the Madrid summit in 1995, carried the cooperation forward. The NTA contains four broad objectives for U.S.-EU collaboration: promoting peace and stability, democracy and development around the world; responding to global challenges; contributing to the expansion of world trade and closer economic relations; and building bridges Across the Atlantic.

In connection with the adoption of the New Transatlantic Agenda, a Joint EU-U.S. Action Plan was drawn up committing the EU and the U.S. to a large number of measures within the overall areas of cooperation. As an extension of the NTA efforts, an agreement was reached at the 1998 London summit to intensify cooperation in the area of trade, which resulted in the Transatlantic Economic Partnership (TEP). The TEP covers both bilateral and multilateral trade. Bilaterally, the TEP addresses various types of obstacles to trade and strives to establish agreements on mutual recognition in the areas of goods and services. Furthermore, the TEP addresses cooperation in the areas of public procurement and intellectual property law. Multilaterally, the TEP focuses on further liberalization of trade within the World Trade Organization in order to strengthen world trade. The interests of the business sector, the environment and the consumers are to be integrated into this work.

In building bridges across the Atlantic, a number of people-to-people dialogues have been set up. The goal is to enable individual actors to give their opinion. In connection with each summit meeting time is set aside for meetings with representatives of one or more of these dialogues, which include the Transatlantic Business Dialogue (TABD); the Transatlantic Consumer Dialogue (TACD); the Transatlantic Policy Network (TPN), a non-governmental grouping of members of the U.S. Congress and the European Parliament, business leaders and think tanks; the Transatlantic Environmental Dialogue (TAED); and the Transatlantic Legislators Dialogue (TLD).

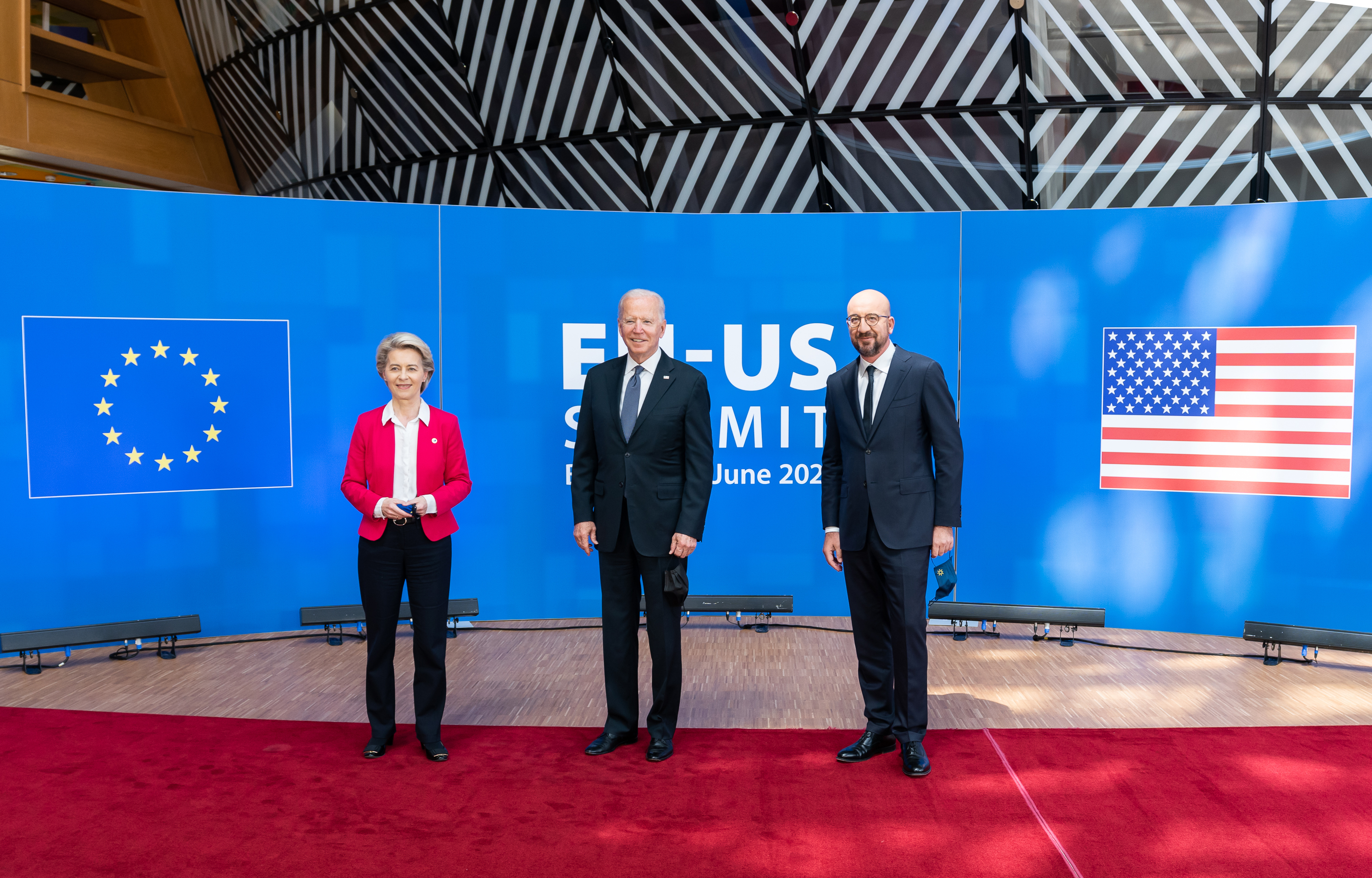
President of the European Commission Von der Leyen (left), U.S. President Biden (center) and President of the European Council Michel (right) in Brussels in June 2021

Together the U.S. and EU play leading roles in international diplomacy, trade, and military strength. It follows that their respective policies and practices are important in setting global standards. Both the U.S. and the majority of EU member states are members of the North Atlantic Treaty Organization (NATO). Despite this, they have regularly disagreed with each other on a wide range of specific issues, as well as having often quite different political, economic, and social agendas. Since the EU does not have a fully integrated foreign policy, relations can become more complicated when its member states do not have a unanimous position, such as when EU foreign policy was divided during the Iraq War. Understanding the relationship today means reviewing developments that predate the creation of the European Economic Community (precursor to today's European Union).

The European experience with the first Trump administration (2017–21) left uncertainty vis-à-vis a realistic prospect on long-term predictability of U.S. foreign policy. The period saw a deepening of contradictions between both parties, including trade, climate action and adherence to international treaties. All in all, bilateral relationships deteriorated and endured a profound damage under the first Trump administration.

On December 2, 2020, following the 2020 U.S. presidential election, a joint communication published by the European Commission lined up a proposal for a new agenda of improvement of the EU–US relations with the incoming Biden administration, seeking for partnership in four major policy areas: health response, climate change, trade and tech, and security.

On March 5, 2021, following a call between EU Commission president Ursula von der Leyen and U.S. president Joe Biden, the EU and the U.S. agreed to suspend all the retaliatory tariffs linked to the Airbus and Boeing disputes for a 4-month period.

The fall of Afghanistan in August 2021 had a negative impact on European Union–United States relations.

On September 20, 2021, EU Commission President Ursula Von der Leyen called "not acceptable" the treatment of one of EU's member states (France) over the AUKUS submarine deal, when Australia, the United States and the UK negotiated a defense pact ditching a long-standing Australian agreement with France. Similarly, European Council president Charles Michel denounced a "lack of loyalty" on the part of the US.

The EU–US Trade and Technology Council (TTC) met for the first time on September 29, 2021, in Pittsburgh.

=== Second Donald Trump presidency (2025–present) ===
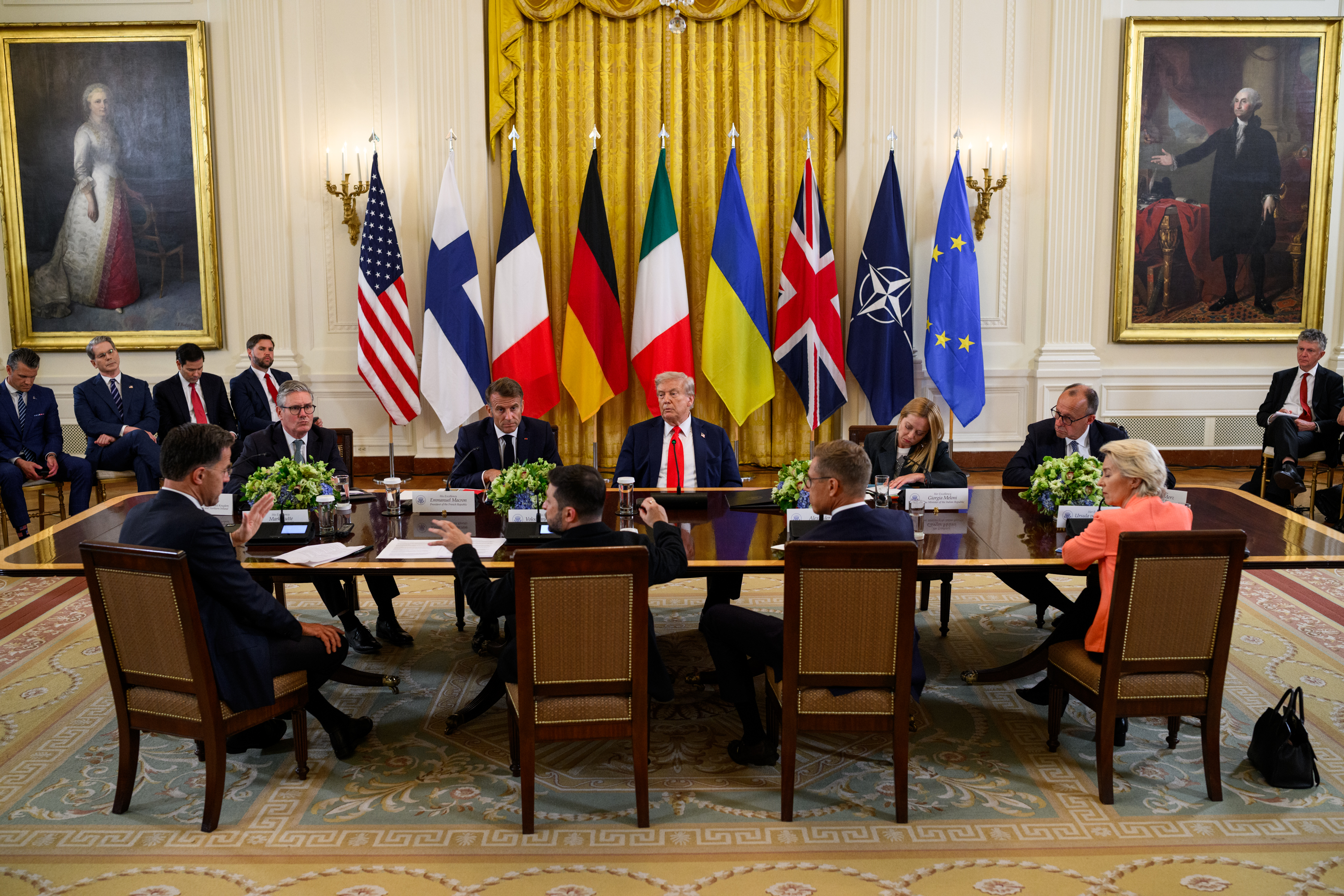
EU, NATO members and Zelenskyy in Washington D.C., August 18, 2025

The relations between the European Union and the United States worsened significantly after Donald Trump had been sworn in as the President of the United States in January 2025. By January 2026, relations were considered at one of their lowest points, and compared to the Suez Crisis and 2003 invasion of Iraq.

The United States' declarations regarding the need for an increased European involvement in its own defense as well as Donald Trump's calls to decrease US military involvement in Europe were seen by the European Union officials as a sign of lack of commitment towards NATO and European defense by the United States. Various controversial statements involving both the US President Donald Trump and as the vice president of the United States JD Vance including threats to annex Greenland as well as accusations of lack of democracy in the European Union were perceived as acts of hostility and unnecessary involvement in the internal affairs of the European Union by the United States.

On February 14, 2025, US Vice-President JD Vance delivered a speech filled with misinformation and falsehoods before the 2025 Munich Security Conference in which he openly advocated support for extremist far-right movements within Europe, criticized the leadership of the European Union for insufficient spending on defense and falsely claimed that censorship in the European Union was being used against far-right groups. The speech was met with widespread shock, condemnation and outrage from EU leaders; the former Prime Minister of Sweden Carl Bildt called Vance's speech "significantly worse than expected". The head of European Union diplomacy, Kaja Kallas, said that she had the feeling that the United States was "trying to pick a fight with us." The German Minister of Defense Boris Pistorius said that Vance's comparison of parts of Europe to authoritarian regimes was "not acceptable".

The speech has been described by both EU and US media outlets as a watershed moment, and a turning point in EU-US relations; that it marked the beginning of the end for the transatlantic alliance and that, going forward, the EU and the US were no longer friends and allies but necessary partners only.

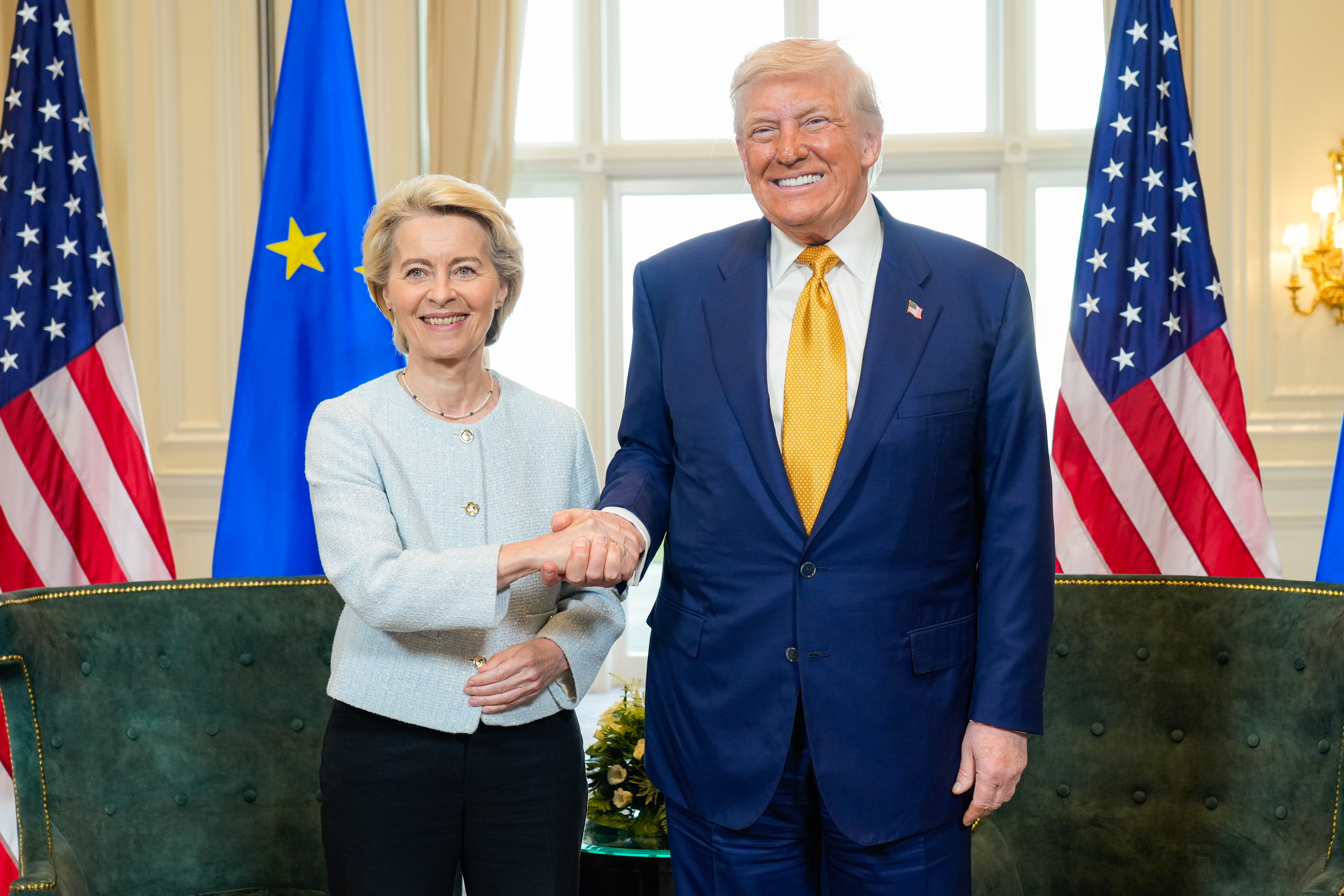
European Commission President Ursula von der Leyen with US President Donald Trump in Scotland, July 27, 2025

On July 27, 2025, the United States and the European Union reached a political agreement on a trade agreement, providing for 15% tariffs on European exports. The deal was announced by Trump and President of the European Commission, Ursula von der Leyen, at Turnberry, Scotland. European states committed to $750 billion in energy purchases and $600 billion in additional investments in the United States. On 21 August, the EU and the US issued a joint statement with details of the trade agreement. On 28 August, the Commission put forward regulations for the Parliament and Council to enact the EU's tariff reductions, a necessary step for the US to retroactively lower its tariffs on EU cars to 15% from 1 August.

In September 2025, Donald Trump urged EU member states to stop buying Russian oil and start putting economic pressure on China for funding Russia's war effort in Ukraine. The Treasury Secretary Scott Bessent said the Trump administration is "prepared to increase pressure on Russia, but we need our European partners to follow us." Trump urged the EU to impose 100% tariffs on China and India. However, EU officials deemed the move unlikely due to legal constraints, trade considerations—especially trade talks with India—and a preference for targeted sanctions over broad tariffs.

The administration has taken opposition to EU laws, with Trump posting: "I will stand up to Countries that attack our incredible American Tech Companies. Digital Taxes, Digital Services Legislation, and Digital Markets Regulations". In a February 2025 Fact Sheet, the administration stated it would "consider responsive actions like tariffs to combat the digital service taxes (DSTs), fines, practices and policies that foreign governments levy on American companies", and that "the Digital Markets Act and the Digital Services Act, will face scrutiny from the Administration". In May 2025, the administration announced that it would implement a "Visa Restriction Policy Targeting Foreign Nationals Who Censor Americans" citing concern over "flagrant censorship actions against U.S. tech companies". The FCC chair Brendan Carr had previously described the Digital Services Act (DSA) as "positioned to thwart efforts by U.S. tech companies to preserve and respect First Amendment principles on their platforms" and stated that "the Trump Administration made clear that the DSA threatens freedom of speech and diversity of opinion both within the United States and worldwide". In August 2025, an internal diplomatic cable was reported to have "instructed U.S. diplomats in Europe to launch a lobbying campaign to build opposition to the" DSA. The FTC chair Andrew N. Ferguson sent letters to tech companies, warning against "censoring" "in response to the laws, demands, or expected demands of foreign powers", including the DSA. Reuters reported that a US diplomatic cable, dated February 2026, directed diplomats to "counter unnecessarily burdensome regulations, such as data localization mandates".

In December 2025, the US President Donald Trump released the National Security Strategy of his administration, which said that negotiating "an expeditious cessation of hostilities in Ukraine" is in the US's core interest, but states that the US "finds itself at odds with European officials who hold unrealistic expectations for the war perched in unstable minority governments, many of which trample on basic principles of democracy to suppress opposition". The document devotes significant criticism to Europe, saying its economic problems are "eclipsed by the real and more stark prospect of civilizational erasure". It stated the "larger issues facing Europe include activities of the European Union and other transnational bodies that undermine political liberty and sovereignty, migration policies that are transforming the continent and creating strife, censorship of free speech and suppression of political opposition, cratering birthrates, and loss of national identities and self-confidence", while noting the "growing influence of patriotic European parties indeed gives cause for great optimism". It also said: "Over the long term, it is more than plausible that within a few decades at the latest, certain NATO members will become majority non-European," The document calls for the US to prioritize "cultivating resistance to Europe's current trajectory within European nations". After this, the President of the European Council António Costa was pretty eager to denounce Trump's memo as a cause for concern as if there was need for protection against (Europe's) own allies. Furthermore, Trump's memo seems to have a hidden part that actively pursues the idea to derange the EU by the help of four EU member states as if to disrupt the EU from the inside. The four concerned countries are Italy, Hungary, Austria and Poland. Austria was quick to announce that it regards any such forthcoming as meddling in its internal affairs. Trump's move was themelined by the slogan 'Make Europe great again' as if it is an adjacent to MAGA - 'Make America great again.' Italy threatened to block the agreement over Mercosur with South America in the direct aftermath of Trump's memo.

On 24 December 2025, the US State Department issued travel bans on several EU individuals including former European Commissioner for Internal Market Thierry Breton and Anna-Lena von Hodenberg and Josephine Ballon of Germany's HateAid, stating that they "have led organized efforts to coerce American platforms to punish American viewpoints they oppose". The European Commission responded by saying that it "strongly condemns" the sanctions, and stating that it requested clarifications from the US.

A fresh dispute emerged in January 2026 regarding President Donald Trump's proposed plan for a Peace Council. According to internal EU documents obtained by Reuters, the European External Action Service stated that it was extremely concerned about the unusual amount of power that had been given to the head of the council (Trump for life). The EU considered this organizational setup to go against its fundamental constitutional values and its legal autonomy.

Another dispute emerged between Secretary of State Rubio and EU Foreign Policy Chief Kaja Kallas. She asked Rubio why he (as the U.S.) did not exert more pressure on Russia. Rubio became angry and snapped back: "We are doing everything in our power to end the war. If you think you can do it better, go ahead. We'll step back". Meanwhile, Italy denied landing permission for two U.S. bombers in Sicily. In context of the Iran war, Hegseth fired the Chief of Staff of the Army on 2 April 2026. Italy and Poland then responded that they won't join Trump's Board of Peace. Meloni also made an emergency trip to the Middle East and hailed the Iran truce agreement. Trump's endorsement of Orban in Hungary's election was another blow to his (Trump's) position in terms of stiff EU opposition because Orban lost by a landslide and he (Trump) thus accelerated the EU's popularity involuntarily.

Spain released a statement concerning the strait of Hormuz that there is no US (NATO) hegemony over it on april 10th. In effect, Hegseth decried the position as (inept) and demanded allied support from the partners without reluctance. There also surfaced emails which demanded that Spain shall be booted from NATO. Prime Sanchez took a stand then claiming that Spain is a reliable NATO partner.

Hegseth then made some divisive remarks at the 2026 D-Day celebration in Normandy claiming that Europe is facing some mass invasion: "Beaches in Spain, in Italy, in Greece and Bulgaria. Boats and men arrive." It stirred a massive backlash among French and European as well as British observers.

There seem to have been implications of Canada becoming an associate member of the EU. The move was not welcomed by the Trump administration.

G7 countries agreed upon the deal that the EU will release part of its Diesel reserves while the US will drop its threat of an export ban on Diesel towards the EU.

== Trade ==
Euro-American relations are primarily concerned with trade policy. The EU is a near-fully unified trade bloc and this, together with competition policy, are the primary matters of substance currently between the EU and the U.S. The two together represent 60% of global GDP, 33% of world trade in goods and 42% of world trade in services. The growth of the EU's economic power has led to a number of trade conflicts between the two powers, although both are dependent upon the other's economic market. See below for details of trade flows.

| Direction of Trade | Goods | Services | Investment | Total |
|---|---|---|---|---|
| EU to US | €260 billion | €139.0 billion | €112.6 billion | €511.6 billion |
| US to EU | €127.9 billion | €180 billion | €144.5 billion | €452.4 billion |

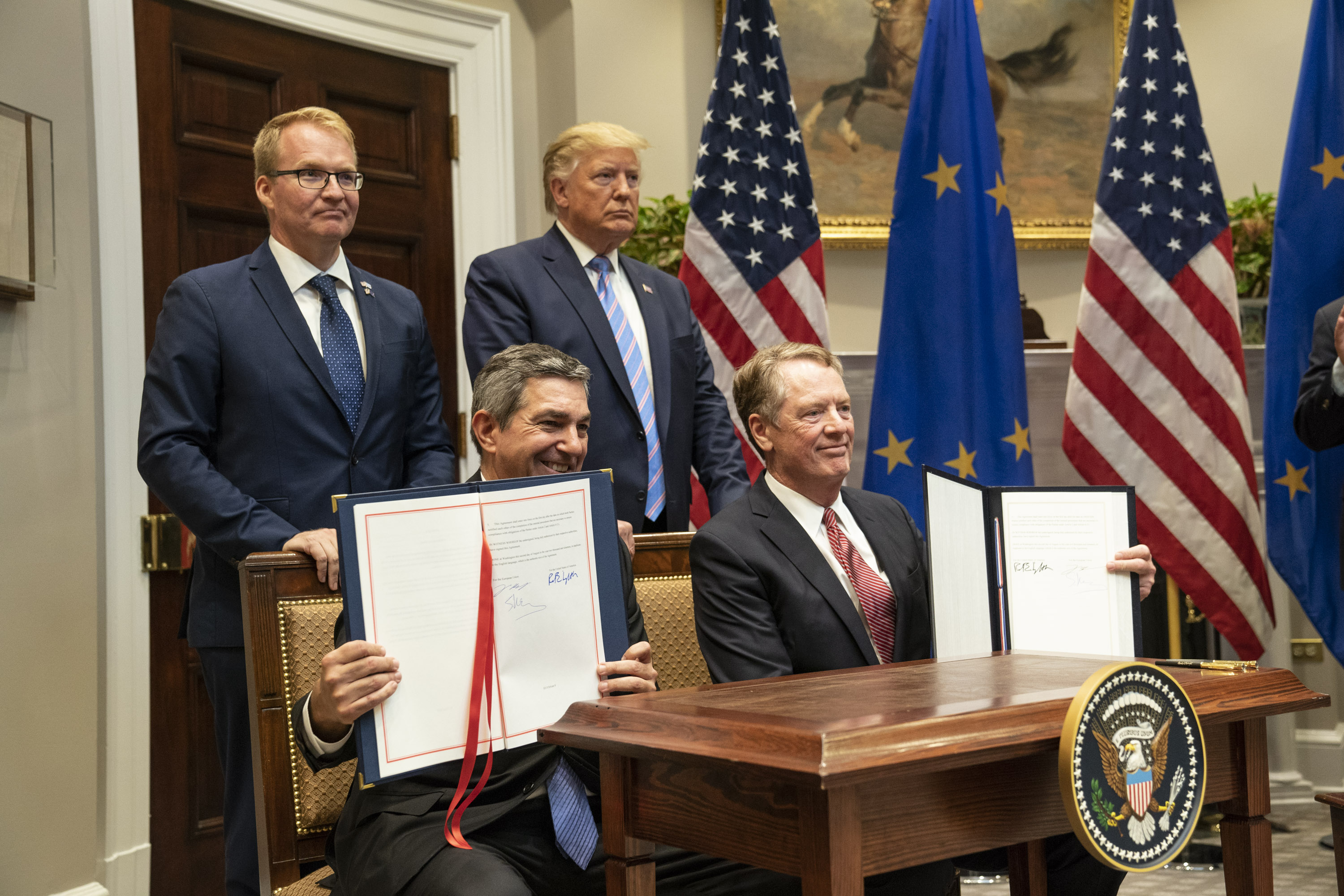
Representatives from the EU and the U.S. sign a beef exports trade deal in 2019.

In 2007, a Transatlantic Economic Council was established to direct economic cooperation between the two. It is headed by the U.S. Deputy National Security Advisor for International Economic Affairs and the EU's Commissioner for Trade. However, it is yet to produce solid results. A Transatlantic Free Trade Area had been proposed in the 1990s and later in 2006 by German Chancellor Angela Merkel in reaction to the collapse of the Doha round of trade talks. However, protectionism on both sides may be a barrier to any future agreement. Recent developments have seen the proposal of a new agreement called the Transatlantic Trade and Investment Partnership (TTIP) between the U.S. and the EU. This agreement has the aim of fostering economic growth through bilateral trade and investments. In August 2019, Trump announced an accord to increase beef exports to the European Union. The U.S. Trade Representative Robert Lighthizer signed agreement with Jani Raappana, representing EU Presidency, and Ambassador Stavros Lambrinidis of the EU delegation.

The U.S. and the EU are key trading partners. See below for the percentage of total trade which each partner comprised for the other in 2017. For example, 18.7% of the United States' total merchandise exports went to the European Union, while 20.1% of the European Union's total merchandise exports went to the United States.

Relative Trade Reliance 2017
| Trading Partner | Merchandise Exports | Merchandise Imports | Commercial Services Exports | Commercial Services Imports |
|---|---|---|---|---|
| % of total US trade made up by the EU: | 18.7% | 18.9% | 30.9% | 35.3% |
| % of total EU trade made up by the US: | 20.1% | 14.2% | 27.2% | 30.5% |

=== Tariffs ===
In August 2020, the EU and U.S. agreed, for the first time in two decades, to reduce certain tariffs (on a most favoured nation basis, meaning the tariffs are dropped for all trading partners). But in 2025, U.S. President Trump stated his intention to reduce the U.S. trade deficit and achieve 'energy dominance'. He linked the two goals on April 7, 2025, calling on the European Union to buy $350 billion in American energy to eliminate its trade surplus with the United States. The EU faces a 20 percent tariff if it fails to reach a deal with Trump. After the July 2025 agreement between the United States and the European Union, which imposed a 15 percent import tariff on most EU goods, French Prime Minister Francois Bayrou called it a "submission," while German Chancellor Friedrich Merz said the deal would significantly damage his country's finances. The EU-Mercosur free trade agreement came into effect the 1st of may 26, creating another contrast to Trump's protectionist policies while being somewhat in his neighborhood.

Trump imposed tariffs on drones and their parts in august 2026. The EU received a preferential rate of 15%.

== Cooperation ==
=== Energy and sustainability ===
The U.S. and EU cooperate on the topic of energy and sustainability. The general aim of both parties is to liberalize and enhance sustainability in the global energy markets. This cooperation officially started in 2009 when the EU-US Energy Council was founded. This institution regularly meets and addresses topics such as: energy security challenges, climate change, renewable energy, nuclear safety and research.

In February 2021, President of the European Commission Ursula von der Leyen stated that the European Union and United States should join forces in combatting climate change and agreeing on a new framework for the digital market to limit the power of large tech companies. Both the EU and U.S. have set goals by 2050 to cut its net greenhouse gas emissions and to become a 'net zero economy' respectively.

=== Defense contracts ===
In March 2010 EADS and its U.S. partner pulled out of a contract to build air refueling planes worth $35 billion. They had previously won the bid but it was rerun and EADS claimed the new process was biased towards Boeing. The European Commission said it would be "highly regrettable" if the tendering process did prove to be biased. There was substantial opposition to EADS in Washington due to the ongoing Boeing-Airbus (owned by EADS) dispute.

On 26 April 2023, the European Defence Agency (EDA) and the Department of Defense have formalized a framework for cooperation through the signing of an Administrative Arrangement (AA). The EDA-DoD AA provides for stronger transatlantic cooperation in defense in specific areas, including in the exchange of information.

In February 2026, U.S. officials raised concerns regarding European Union initiatives aimed at strengthening the bloc's defence industrial base through measures encouraging local procurement. According to reporting, American representatives communicated to EU counterparts that restricting access for U.S. defence companies to the European arms market could negatively affect transatlantic defence relations. U.S. officials indicated that potential exclusion of American firms from EU defence contracts might prompt retaliatory measures. The discussions took place amid broader EU efforts to review defence procurement rules and reduce dependence on non-EU suppliers.

=== EU–US summits ===
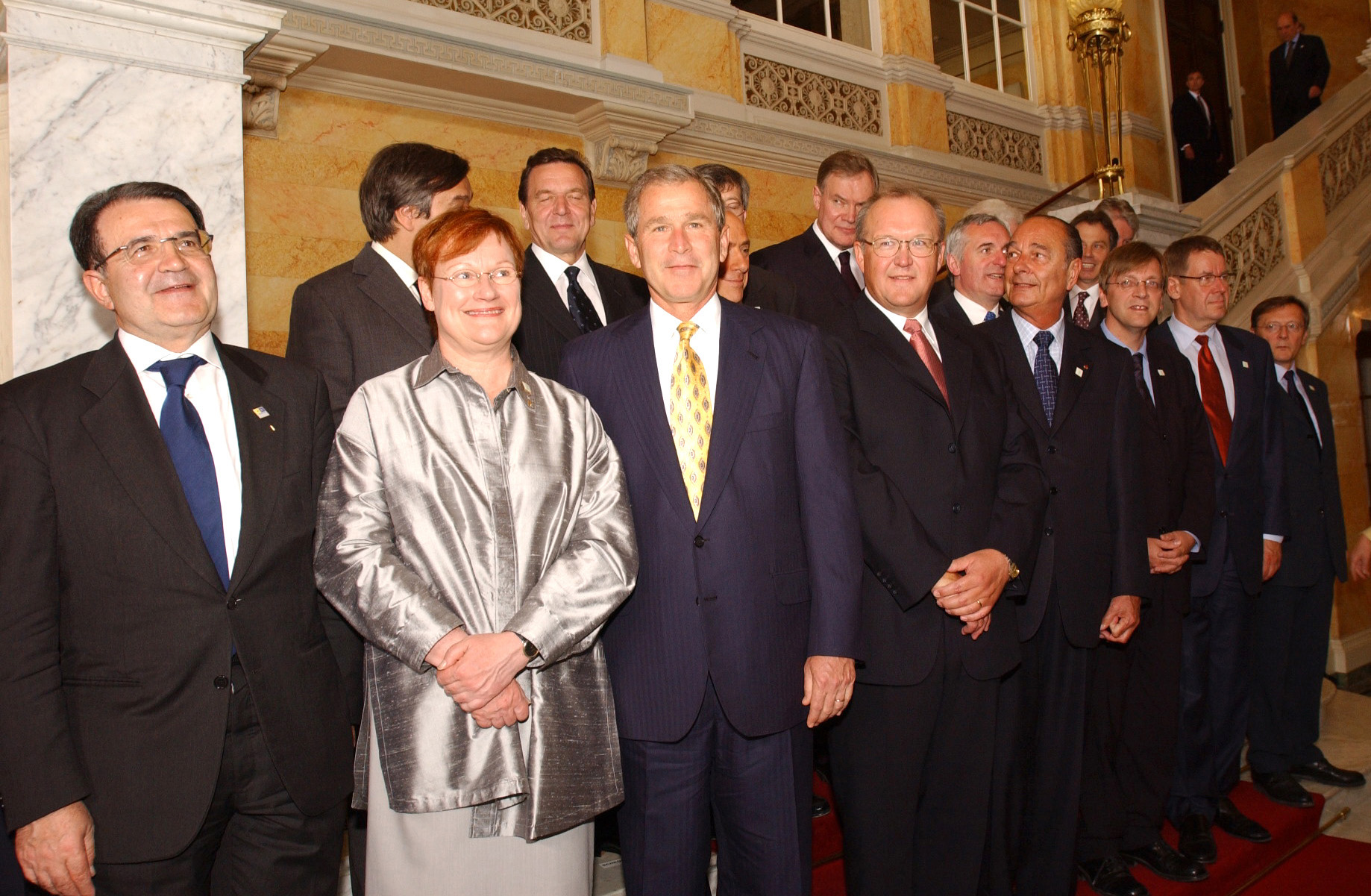
2001 Gothenburg summit

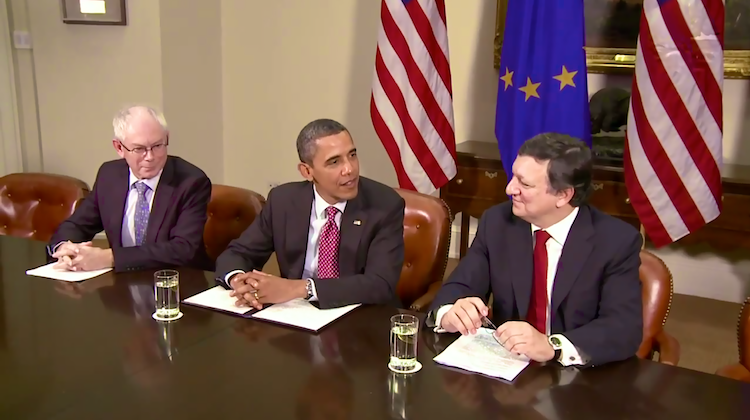
2011 Washington summit

Summits are held between United States and European Union policy makers. When these take place in Europe, they have historically taken place in the country that holds the rotating Presidency of the European Union.

List of summits
| Year | Host country | Location |
|---|---|---|
| 1995 | Spain | Madrid |
| 1997 | Netherlands | The Hague |
| 1997 | United States | Washington, D.C. |
| 1998 | United Kingdom^{a} | London |
| 1998 | United States | Washington, D.C. |
| 1999 | United States | Washington, D.C. |
| 2000 | Portugal | Queluz |
| 2001 | Sweden | Gothenburg |
| 2002 | United States | Washington, D.C. |
| 2003 | United States | Washington, D.C. |
| 2004 | Ireland | Shannon |
| 2005 | United States | Washington, D.C. |
| 2006 | Austria | Vienna |
| 2007 | United States | Washington, D.C. |
| 2008 | Slovenia | Ljubljana |
| 2009 | Czech Republic | Prague (informal summit) |
| 2009 | United States | Washington, D.C. |
| 2010 | Spain | Madrid |
| 2010 | United States | Washington, D.C. |
| 2011 | United States | Washington, D.C. |
| 2014 | Belgium | Brussels |
| 2017 | Belgium | Brussels |
| 2021 | Belgium | Brussels |

^a The United Kingdom was a member of the EU at the time the summit took place.

== Disputes ==
=== Boeing and Airbus subsidies ===
The two companies are the major competing aircraft manufacturers, and both Boeing and Airbus are accused of receiving forms of subsidy from the United States and from some of the European Union member states respectively. Both sides have criticized each other for doing so.

In December 2020, the United States announced plans to impose additional tariffs on certain products from France and Germany, particularly aircraft parts and wines, in retaliation to tariffs imposed by the European Union.

=== Genetically modified food ===
Genetically modified food is another significant area of disagreement between the two. The EU has been under domestic pressure to restrict the growth and import of genetically modified foods until their safety is proven to the satisfaction of the populace.

=== Rendition ===
The Washington Post claimed on November 2, 2005, that the United States was maintaining several secret jails (or "black sites") in Eastern Europe. Poland and Romania, however, have denied these allegations. Also, Central Intelligence Agency (CIA) planes carrying terror suspects would have made secret stopovers in several West European countries since 2001. Belgium, Iceland, Spain, and Sweden have launched investigations. On November 30, 2005 The Guardian calculated that CIA planes landed approximately 300 times at European airports. Most planes would have landed in Germany and the United Kingdom as a transit point to Eastern Europe, North Africa (possibly Morocco and Egypt), or the Middle East (possibly Syria and Jordan). While the European Commission—on behalf of the European Union—asked the United States for a clarification, the U.S. has refused to confirm or deny the reports.

Extraordinary rendition flights through Europe were investigated over a number of years by the European Parliament and it held a temporary committee on the matter. The EU has also opposed the use of the Guantanamo Bay detention camp and offered to host some former inmates when its closure was announced by the administration of U.S. President Barack Obama.

=== Capital punishment ===
In the United States, capital punishment is a legal form of punishment, whereas all European Union member states have fully abolished it and consider its use to be a violation of fundamental human rights. This occasionally causes problems with EU-US relations, because it is illegal in the European Union to allow the extradition of a citizen to a country where the death penalty is a legal punishment, unless a guarantee is given that such punishment will not be used.

=== International Criminal Court ===
Positions in the United States concerning the International Criminal Court vary widely. The Clinton Administration signed the Rome Statute in 2000, but did not submit it for Senate ratification. The Bush Administration, the U.S. administration at the time of the ICC's founding, stated that it would not join the ICC. The Obama Administration has subsequently re-established a working relationship with the court.

=== Iraq War ===
The Iraq War divided opinions within European nations and within the United States, with some states supporting of military action, and some against. The European public opinion was staunchly opposed to the war. This caused a major transatlantic rift, especially between the states led by France and Germany on the one hand, who were against military action, and the United States with United Kingdom, Italy, Spain and Poland.

=== Kyoto Protocol ===
The European Union is one of the main backers of the Kyoto Protocol, which aims to combat global warming. While the United States signed the protocol at its creation during the Clinton Administration, its senate failed to ratify it, a requirement to give the protocol the force of law in the United States. In March 2001, during the presidency of George W. Bush, the United States removed its signature from the protocol, leading to much acrimony between the United States and European nations. In 2008, President Barack Obama said that he planned on setting annual targets to reduce emissions, although this doesn't include the Kyoto Protocol.

=== Nord Stream ===
In mid-June 2017, Germany and Austria issued a joint statement that said the proposed anti-Russian Countering America's Adversaries Through Sanctions Act bill heralded a "new and very negative quality in European-American relations" and that certain provisions affecting gas pipeline projects with Russia were an illegal threat to EU energy security.

On July 26, 2017, France's foreign ministry described the new U.S. sanctions as illegal under international law due to their extraterritorial reach.

At the end of July 2017, the proposed law's Russia sanctions caused harsh criticism and threats of retaliatory measures on the part of the European Union President Jean-Claude Juncker. Germany's minister for Economics and Energy Brigitte Zypries described the sanctions as illegal under international law and urged the European Union to take appropriate counter-measures.

=== Spying ===
Secret documents obtained by German news magazine Der Spiegel in 2013 state that European Union offices in the United States and United Nations headquarters have been targeted for spying by the National Security Agency (NSA), an intelligence office operated by the United States government. The reports revealed that the United States bugged offices, accessed internal computer networks, obtained documents and emails, and listened to phone calls. Subsequent reports from the media further state that domestic European Union offices in Brussels have also been targeted; along with EU offices, embassies of India, Japan, Mexico, South Korea and Turkey are also listed as targets in the documents. On June 30, 2013, the President of the European Parliament, Martin Schulz demanded for a full clarification from Washington and stated that if the allegations were true, EU and U.S. relations would be severely impacted.

=== Dispute with China ===
While most Americans see China as a rival (52%) or an enemy (38%), Europeans have more mixed attitudes toward China, according to a recent Pew Research Center study. On average, 43% of Europeans see China as "a necessary partner" compared to 24% who see the country as a rival or 11% as an enemy.

=== Resolved ===
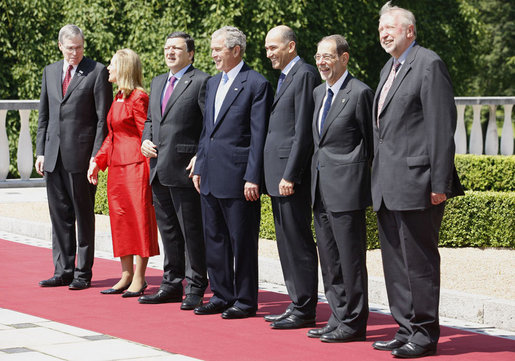
EU-US summit at Brdo Castle in 2008

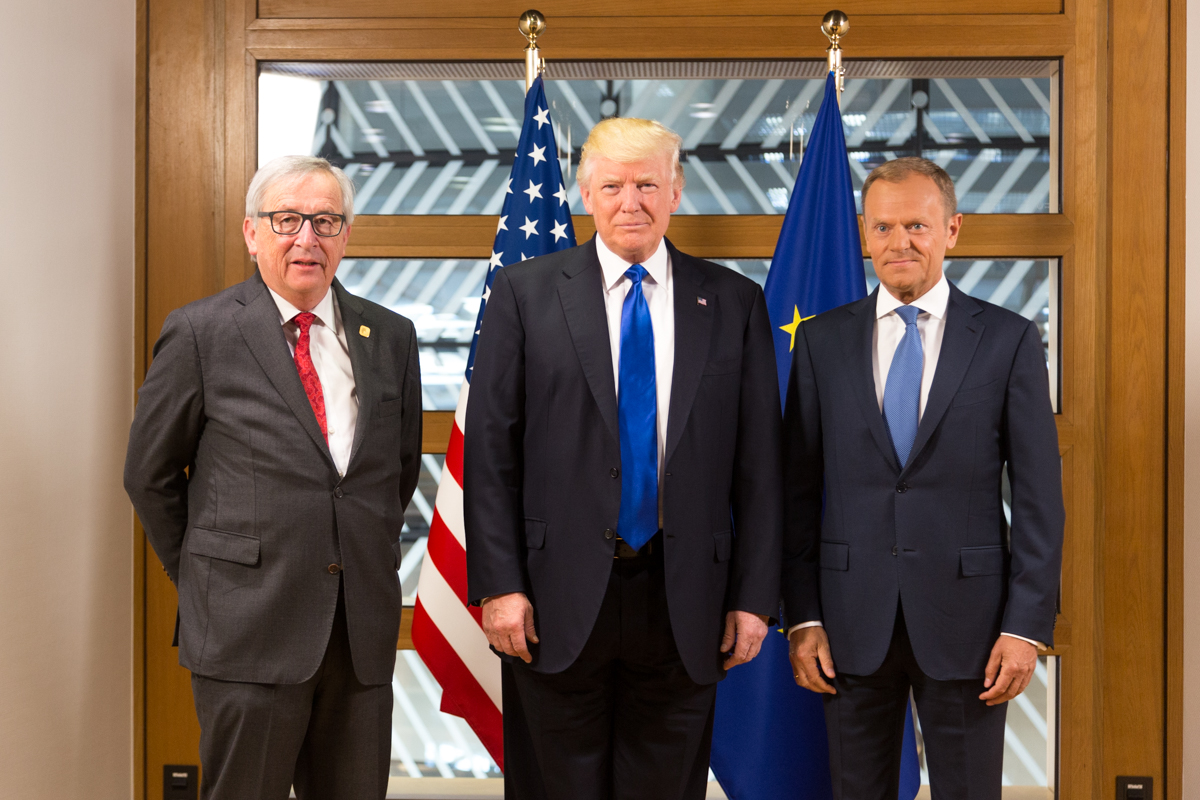
U.S. President Donald Trump with President of the European Council Donald Tusk and President of the European Commission Jean-Claude Juncker on 25 May 2017 in Brussels, Belgium

==== Banana wars ====
The EU and the U.S. have had a long-running dispute over the EU's banana imports. As part of their international aid, the EU offered tenders, on a first-come-first-served basis, for bananas from countries in Africa, the Caribbean and the Pacific. The United States argued that it favored local producers in former colonies of EU member-states over US-owned corporations in Latin America. The Clinton administration responded by imposing heavy tariffs on luxury goods created in the EU. Such goods included cashmere from Scotland and French Cognac brandy, made in the original constituency of then Prime Minister of France Jean-Pierre Raffarin. The Clinton administration then took the banana wars to the World Trade Organization (WTO) in 1999, after Chiquita made a $500,000 donation to the Democratic Party. The two sides reached an agreement in 2001.

== Delegations ==
Diplomatic relations are maintained between the U.S. and the EU, as an independent body, as well as all EU member states.

The EU is represented in the U.S. by the Delegation of the European Union to the United States in Washington, D.C. Opened in 1954, it was the first overseas delegation of the EU's forerunner, the European Coal and Steel Community (ECSC). The current EU ambassador to the United States, since 2024, is Jovita Neliupšienė. Additionally, all 27 EU member states have an embassy in Washington, D.C.

The United States' diplomatic mission to the EU is the United States Mission to the European Union in Brussels. The current U.S. ambassador to the EU, since 2022, is Mark Gitenstein. The United States established a diplomatic mission to the ECSC in 1956 in the city of Luxembourg and, in 1961, the United States Mission to the European Communities in Brussels. The U.S. has embassies in all 27 EU member states.

The Transatlantic Economic Council is a bilateral forum for economic cooperation between the EU and U.S. established during the 2007 US-EU Summit. It meets at least once per year and is jointly headed by the U.S. Deputy National Security Advisor for International Economic Affairs and the EU's Commissioner for Trade.

== Diplomacy ==
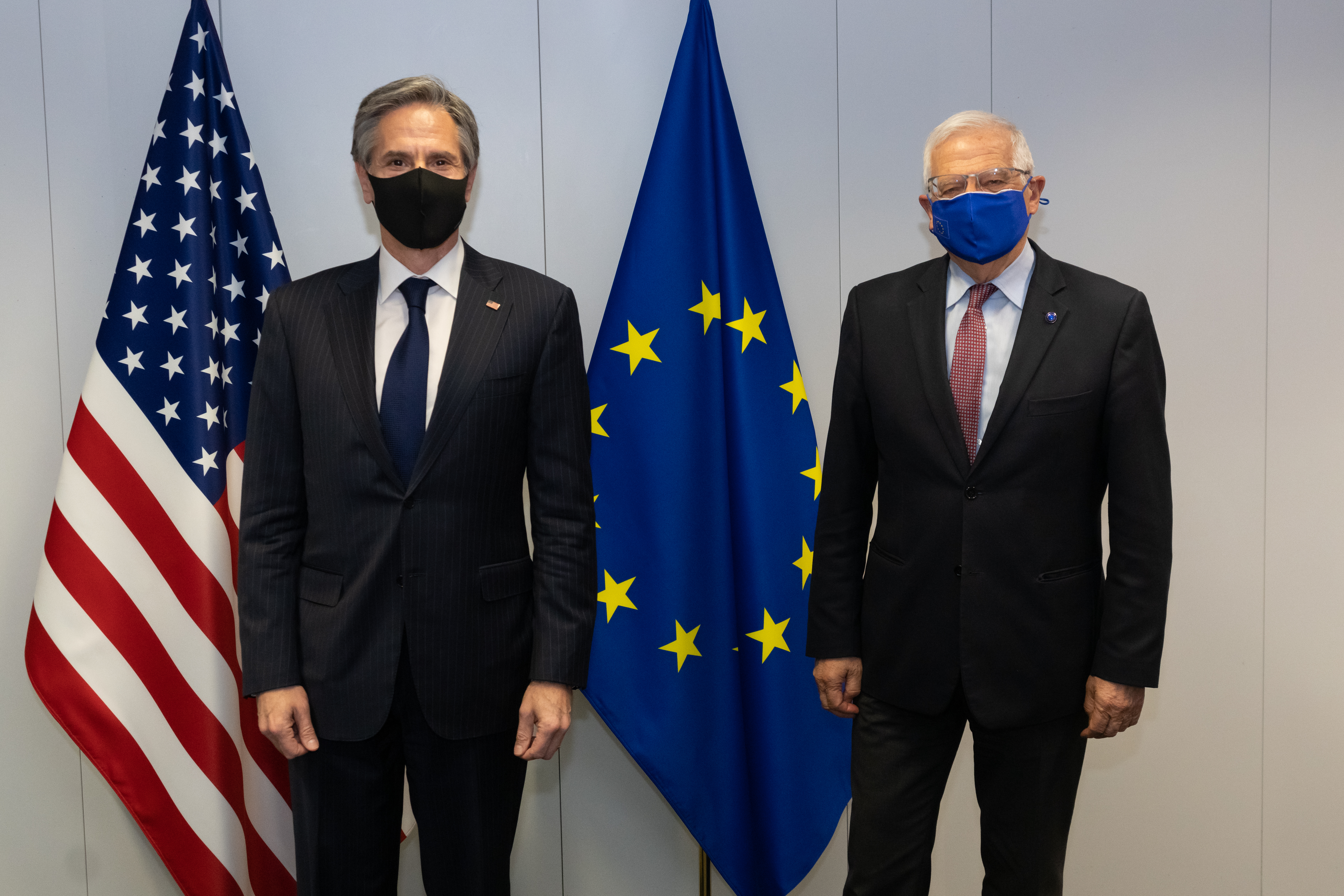
US Secretary of State Blinken (left) and EU High Representative for Foreign Affairs and Security Policy and Vice President of the European Commission Borrell (right) in Brussels on 24 March 2021

The U.S. and the EU each has a distinct approach to diplomacy. The scholar Michael Smith defined the U.S. as a "warrior state". This refers to its diplomatic approach based on sovereignty, state action and the use of military capabilities. On the other hand, the EU displays a diplomacy which is one of a "trading state". This means that EU diplomacy focuses on soft power, negotiation and trade. The EU diplomatic style reflects the fact that there is not a strong and cohesive foreign policy among its member states. The U.S. and EU diplomatic features are also reflected in their relations with the United Nations. The EU relies more on the permission of the UN in order to use force abroad while the U.S. adopts a position of opposition towards UN authorization for interference.

Poland is urging the EU to start a campaign in the U.S. to enhance transatlantic relations and combat Russian disinformation before the U.S. presidential election. The focus is on showcasing the benefits of EU-U.S. cooperation and correcting false narratives, especially regarding European aid to Ukraine. This move responds to Russian efforts to undermine support for Ukraine.

== United States's foreign relations with EU member states ==
- Austria
- Belgium
- Bulgaria
- Croatia
- Cyprus
- Czech Republic
- Denmark
- Estonia
- Finland
- France
- Germany
- Greece
- Hungary
- (Republic of Ireland) Ireland
- Italy
- Latvia
- Lithuania
- Luxembourg
- Malta
- Netherlands
- Poland
- Portugal
- Romania
- Slovakia
- Slovenia
- Spain
- Sweden

== See also ==
- Transatlantic relations
- NATO–EU relations
- Transatlantic Free Trade Area
- Élysée Treaty
- Strategic autonomy
- NATO
- Cold War
- War on terror
