= Transatlantic relations =

Relations between countries bordering the Atlantic Ocean

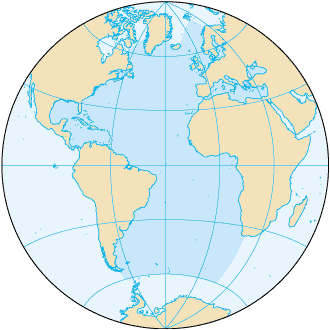
Atlantic Ocean

Transatlantic relations refer to the historic, cultural, political, economic and social relations between countries on both side of the Atlantic Ocean. Sometimes it specifically means relationships between the Anglophone North American countries (the United States and Canada), and particular European countries or organizations, although other meanings are possible.

There are a number of issues over which the United States and Europe generally disagree. Some of these are cultural, such as the U.S. use of the death penalty, some are international issues such as the Middle East peace process where the United States is often seen as pro-Israel and where Europe is often seen as pro-Arab (or at least neutral), and many others are trade related. The current U.S. policies are often described as being unilateral in nature, whereas the European Union and Canada are often said to take a more multilateral approach, relying more on the United Nations and other international institutions to help solve issues. There are many other issues upon which they agree.

== Definition ==
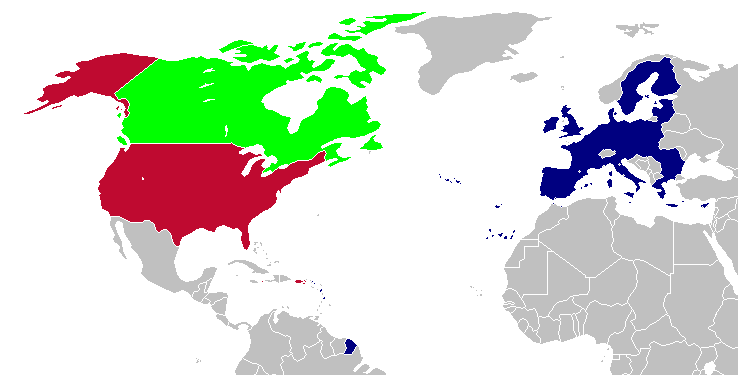
One potential definition of transatlantic relations. The United States (in red), Canada (in green), the European Union and United Kingdom (in blue). Excluded from this definition are non-EU states in Europe other than the United Kingdom, and all of Latin America and Africa.

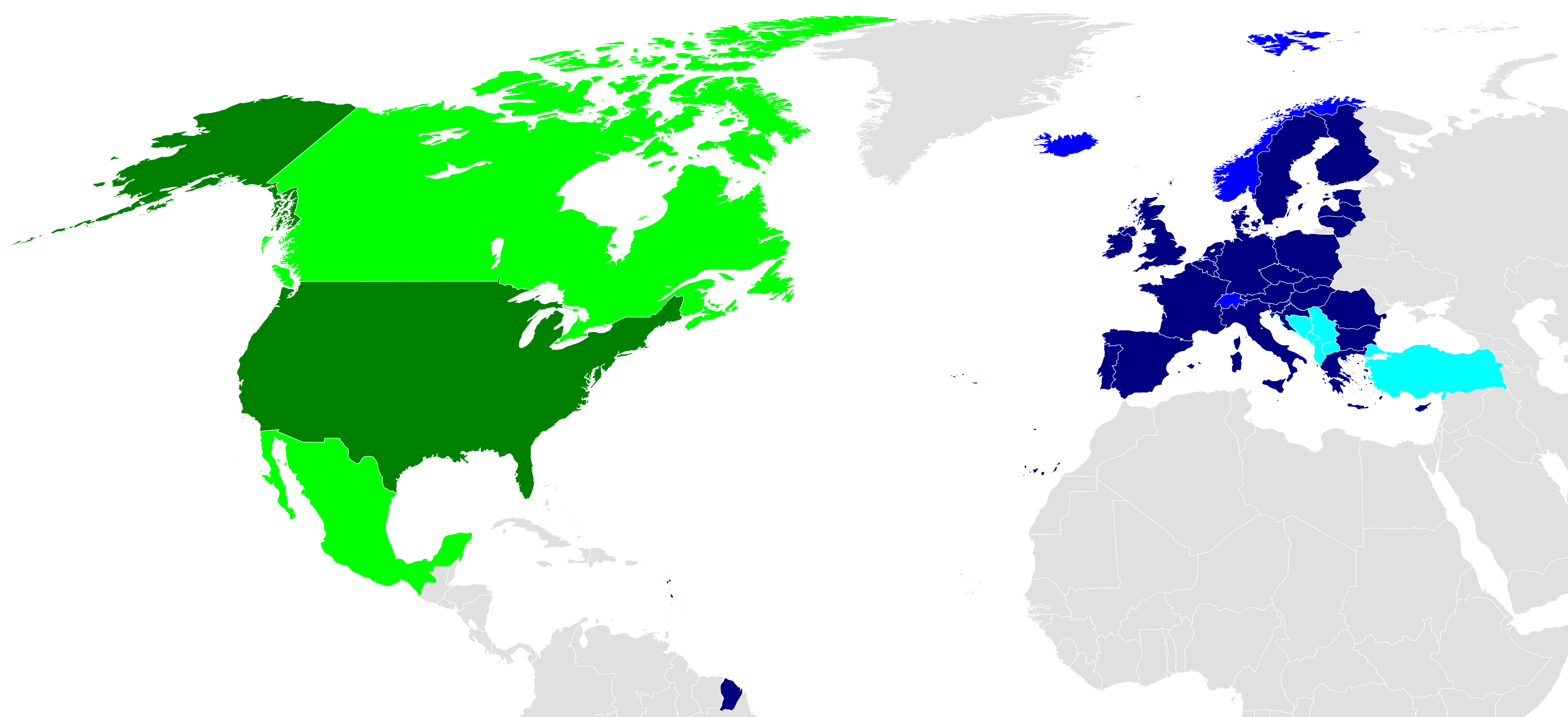
It is proposed to create a Transatlantic Free Trade Area between the United States and European Union. Map shows potential other members: NAFTA, EFTA and future EU members.

Transatlantic relations can refer to relations between individual states or to relations between groups of states or international organizations with other groups or with states, or within one group. For example:
Within a group:

- Intra-NATO relations

e.g. Canada–NATO relations

Between groups:

- EU - North American Free Trade Agreement (NAFTA) relations
- European Free Trade Area (EFTA) - NAFTA relations
- Transatlantic Free Trade Area (theoretical)
- CARIFORUM - European Commission (Economic Partnership Agreements)

Between a group and a state:

- Canada–European Union relations
- United States–European Union relations
- Canada - EFTA Free Trade Agreement

Between states:

- Germany–United States relations
- Canada–France relations, etc.

By language and culture

- Commonwealth of Nations
- Community of Portuguese Language Countries
- Dutch Union
- La Francophonie
- Latin Union

The boundaries of which states are part of Transatlantic relations depends on the context. The term may be used as a euphemism to a specific bilateral relationship, for example, Anglo-American relations. The boundary could be drawn so as only to refer member states of the EU plus the US, when discussing Euro-American relations. In other circumstances it may include Canada, or non-EU countries in Europe. The term may also be used in the context of the wider Atlantic world including Africa and Latin America.

== History ==
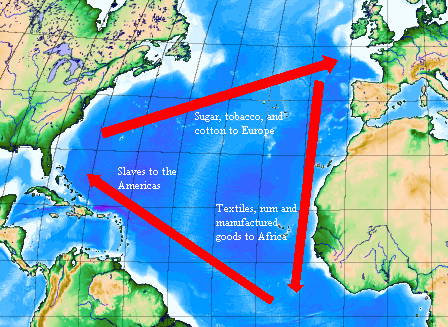
The triangular trade in the North Atlantic

The early relationship between Europe and America was based on colonialism and mercantilism. The majority of modern states in the Americas can be traced back to colonial states that were founded by European nations, states that were very different from the pre-Columbian civilizations and cultures that had existed before.

Even after the United States (and later Canada) became independent, the main relationship between the two continents was one-way migration.

Politically the United States tried to keep a distance from European affairs, and Canada was subordinate to British foreign policy.

During the First World War however both North American states found themselves fighting in Europe and engrossed in European politics. President Woodrow Wilson's Fourteen Points helped to redraw the map of Europe.

Although the Roosevelt administration wanted to enter the war against Germany, the vast majority of Americans were too isolationist and disillusioned at their experience in World War I to seek involvement in the World War II, at least until the U.S. was attacked by Japan at Pearl Harbor on December 7, 1941, and Adolf Hitler declared war on the United States on December 11, 1941. Once involved, the US became pivotal to the war effort and therefore European politics.

After the second war the United States and Canada both desired a permanent role in the defence of Europe, and European states wanted protection from the Soviet Union. The result was the North Atlantic Treaty Organization, which became the lynchpin of Transatlantic relations during the Cold War.

Atlanticism is a philosophy which advocates for close cooperation between North America and Europe. In the 21st century, New Atlanticism has become the primary foreign policy doctrine for the continued close cooperation between North America and Europe.

Non-European countries
Transcontinental countries

Comparison of the two main Euro-Atlantic defence organisations
	European Union (in respect of its defence arm, the Common Security and Defence Policy)		NATO
Mutual defence clause	Article 42.7 of the consolidated version of the Treaty on European Union: "If a Member State is the victim of armed aggression on its territory, the other Member States shall have towards it an obligation of aid and assistance by all the means in their power, in accordance with Article 51 of the United Nations Charter. This shall not prejudice the specific character of the security and defence policy of certain Member States. [...]"		Article 5 of the North Atlantic Treaty: "The Parties agree that an armed attack against one or more of them [on their territory] shall be considered an attack against them all and consequently they agree that, if such an armed attack occurs, each of them, in exercise of the right of individual or collective self-defence recognised by Article 51 of the Charter of the United Nations, will assist the Party or Parties so attacked by taking forthwith, individually and in concert with the other Parties, such action as it deems necessary, including the use of armed force, to restore and maintain the security of the North Atlantic area. [...]"
	Political strategic organisation		
Highest office	High Representative (HR/VP)		Secretary General
Principal decision-making body	Foreign Affairs Council		North Atlantic Council
Liaison body	European External Action Service		International Staff
Seat	Kortenberg building (Brussels, Belgium)		NATO headquarters (Brussels, Belgium)
	Military strategic organisation		
Supreme commander	Director of the Military Planning and Conduct Capability		Supreme Allied Commander Europe
Headquarters	Military Planning and Conduct Capability (Brussels, Belgium)		Supreme Headquarters Allied Powers Europe (Mons, Belgium)
Chair of chiefs of defence assembly	Chairman of the European Union Military Committee		Chair of the NATO Military Committee
Chiefs of defence assembly	European Union Military Committee		NATO Military Committee
Advisory body	European Union Military Staff		International Military Staff
	EU Membership	Permanent Structured Cooperation	NATO Membership
Member states of both the EU and NATO
Belgium	Founder	Founder	Founder
Bulgaria	2007	Founder	2004
Croatia	2013	Founder	2009
Czech Republic	2004	Founder	1999
Denmark	1973	2023	Founder
Estonia	2004	Founder	2004
Finland	1995	Founder	2023
France	Founder	Founder	Founder
Germany	Founder	Founder	1955
Greece	1981	Founder	1952
Hungary	2004	Founder	1999
Italy	Founder	Founder	Founder
Latvia	2004	Founder	2004
Lithuania	2004	Founder	2004
Luxembourg	Founder	Founder	Founder
Netherlands	Founder	Founder	Founder
Poland	2004	Founder	1999
Portugal	1986	Founder	Founder
Romania	2007	Founder	2004
Slovakia	2004	Founder	2004
Slovenia	2004	Founder	2004
Spain	1986	Founder	1982
Sweden	1995	Founder	2024
Non-NATO EU member states
Austria	1995	Founder	Partnership for Peace
Cyprus	2004	Founder	No
Ireland	1973	Founder	Partnership for Peace
Malta	2004	No	Partnership for Peace
Non-EU NATO member states
Albania	Candidate	—N/a	2009
Iceland	No	—N/a	Founder
Montenegro	Candidate	—N/a	2017
North Macedonia	Candidate	—N/a	2020
Norway	Defence Agency agreement	—N/a	Founder
Turkey	Candidate	—N/a	1952
United Kingdom	No	—N/a	Founder
European countries outside both the EU and NATO
Andorra	No	—N/a	No
Armenia	No	—N/a	Individual Partnership Action Plan
Azerbaijan	No	—N/a	Individual Partnership Action Plan
Belarus	No	—N/a	Partnership for Peace
Bosnia and Herzegovina	Candidate	—N/a	Membership Action Plan
Georgia	Candidate	—N/a	Intensified Dialogue
Kazakhstan	No	—N/a	Individual Partnership Action Plan
Kosovo	Applicant / Potential candidate	—N/a	No
Liechtenstein	No	—N/a	No
Moldova	Candidate	—N/a	Individual Partnership Action Plan
Monaco	No	—N/a	No
Russia	No	—N/a	Partnership for Peace
San Marino	No	—N/a	No
Serbia	Candidate	—N/a	Individual Partnership Action Plan
Switzerland	Defence Agency agreement	—N/a	Partnership for Peace
Ukraine	Candidate	—N/a	Intensified Dialogue
Vatican City	No	—N/a	No
NATO member states located in North America, which are therefore ineligible for EU membership
Canada	—N/a	—N/a	Founder
United States	—N/a	—N/a	Founder
Members of NATO's Partnership for Peace located outside Europe, which are therefore neither eligible for EU nor NATO membership
Kyrgyzstan	—N/a	—N/a	Partnership for Peace
Tajikistan	—N/a	—N/a	Partnership for Peace
Turkmenistan	—N/a	—N/a	Partnership for Peace
Uzbekistan	—N/a	—N/a	Partnership for Peace

== See also ==
- Atlanticism
- Atlantic Community
- Atlantic Council
- Atlantic history
- United States–European Union relations
- European Union–NATO relations
- German Marshall Fund
- South Atlantic Peace and Cooperation Zone
- Transatlantic crossing
- Transatlantic Economic Council
- Transatlantic Free Trade Area (TAFTA)
- Canada–European Union relations
- Canada–NATO relations
- Western World

== Bibliography ==
- Jussi M. Hanhimaki, Benedikt Schoenborn and Barbara Zanchetta, "Transatlantic Relations since 1945. An Introduction", Routledge, London, 2012.
