= Transatlantic Economic Partnership =

The Transatlantic Economic Partnership (TEP) was an initiative launched at the May 1998 London Summit which was designed to give new impetus to EU-US co-operation in the field of trade and investment within the framework of the New Transatlantic Agenda (NTA).
