= Transatlantic Legislators' Dialogue =

Taking the existing interparliamentary relationship as its basis, the Transatlantic Legislators' Dialogue (TLD) aims to strengthen and enhance the level of political discourse between European and American legislators. It does so against the background of the numerous other contacts that have resulted in a significantly closer EU-US relationship at a variety of levels. These include, namely, the annual EU-US Summit meetings established by the Transatlantic Declaration of 1990, the Transatlantic Dialogues (Business, Consumers, Environment, and Labour) and other initiatives.

The TLD constitutes the formal response of the two legislative bodies to the commitment in the New Transatlantic Agenda (NTA) of 1995, to enhanced parliamentary ties between the European Union and the United States. In practical terms, the TLD includes the bi-annual meetings of the European Parliament and the US Congress delegations and a series of teleconferences, organised on specific topics of mutual concern, with a view to fostering an ongoing and uninterrupted dialogue.

The two groups of legislators have established a steering committee to co-ordinate TLD activities. The steering committees also maintains contacts with the members of the Senior Level Group (SLG), which is composed of high-ranking officials from the European Commission, the EU Presidency and the US Administration.

The current chairs of the TLD are Radosław Sikorski PPE (Poland/PPE-DE) on the European side and Rep. Jim Costa (D-California) on the American side.
