= United States Mission to the European Union =

United States diplomatic mission

- Location: Rue Zinner (Zinnerstraat) 13; Brussels, Belgium
- Website: Official website

The United States Mission to the European Union (USEU) is the diplomatic mission of the United States to the European Union; it is based in Brussels, Belgium. The US has maintained diplomatic relations with the EU and its predecessors since 1953. The first predecessor of the current mission was the US diplomatic mission to the European Coal and Steel Community in Luxembourg, which opened in 1956. In 1961, the United States Mission to the European Communities was established in Brussels, which later became the United States Mission to the European Union, upon the latter's establishment in 1993.

== History ==
On August 11, 1952, the US became the first non-member state to recognize the European Coal and Steel Community (ECSC), which was formed on 23 July 1952 and consisted of Belgium, France, Italy, Luxembourg, the Netherlands and West Germany. The following year, the US sent observers to the ECSC, at which point diplomatic relations with the ECSC were established. A formal diplomatic mission to the ECSC opened in the city of Luxembourg in 1956. In 1961, the United States Mission to the European Communities was established in Brussels, Belgium. The European Communities was the collective term for three supernational European agencies established in the 1950s—the ECSC, the European Atomic Energy Community, and the European Economic Community (also known simply as the European Community )—which were merged in 1967 into a body also known as the European Communities (EC). The EC had limited foreign policy roles, primarily consisting of trade relations, which were carried out by the European Political Cooperation (EPC), established in 1970. Relations between the US and EC were formalized through the Transatlantic Declaration in 1990.

In 1993, the European Union was established. Relations between the US and EU were defined in the New Transatlantic Agenda (NTA), agreed to in 1995. The NTA set forth four broad areas of cooperation between the US and EU: "promoting peace and stability, democracy and development around the world; responding to global challenges; contributing to the expansion of world trade and closer economic relations; and building bridges Across the Atlantic." The NTA was further extended to cover bilateral and multilateral trade in 1998, through the Transatlantic Economic Partnership (TEP). The Lisbon Treaty, ratified in 2009, established the European External Action Service as the EU's foreign policy institution. Since 2013, the US and EU have been engaged in discussions to create a free trade agreement, known as the Transatlantic Trade and Investment Partnership.

== Mission ==
The mission consists of representatives from the State Department, Office of the United States Trade Representative, United States Commercial Service (part of the Department of Commerce), USDA (Foreign Agricultural Service and Animal and Plant Health Inspection Service), Department of Homeland Security, Department of the Treasury, Department of Justice, Department of Defense, USAID, and the National Oceanic and Atmospheric Administration.

=== Ambassador ===
The diplomatic mission is headed by the United States Ambassador to the European Union. The current United States Ambassador to the European Union is Mark Henry Gitenstein (born March 7, 1947), an American lawyer and diplomat who is serving as the United States ambassador to the European Union since 2022. He was nominated by President Joe Biden on July 27, 2021, and confirmed by the United States Senate on December 18, 2021. He formerly served as the United States ambassador to Romania from 2009 to 2012; he was nominated by President Barack Obama on June 11, 2009 and confirmed by the Senate on July 8, 2009.

The previous Ambassador, Gordon Sondland, was confirmed by the U.S. Senate on June 29, 2018 and arrived in Brussels on July 8, 2018. He presented his credentials at the European Commission and to President of the European Council Donald Tusk on July 9, 2018. He was removed by the President on February 7, 2020.

=== Public diplomacy ===
The Mission's Public Affairs Office (USEU PA) is responsible for engaging Europeans in matters of US policies, society, and US-EU cooperation in various fields. To accomplish this task, the office supports exchange programs for professionals and students; organizes conferences with think tanks and NGOs to facilitate dialogue on issues of mutual interest to the EU and US; engage Europeans on US policy issues through social media outreach; and organizes interviews, speeches, and press conferences with Mission staff and visiting US officials and experts.

== See also ==
- Delegation of the European Union to the United States — The EU's diplomatic mission to the US
- United States Permanent Representative to NATO — Also based in Brussels
- United States Ambassador to Belgium — Also based in Brussels
