= Transatlantic Economic Council =

The United States (orange) and European Union (green)

The Transatlantic Economic Council (TEC) is a body set up between the United States and European Union to direct economic cooperation between the two economies.

== Establishment and chairmanship ==
The TEC was established by an agreement signed on April 30, 2007 at the White House by U.S. President George W. Bush, President of the European Council Angela Merkel (also German Chancellor) and EU Commission President José Manuel Barroso.

The Council is co-chaired by an EU and a U.S. official. Currently, they are US Deputy National Security Advisor for International Economics Daleep Singh and European Commissioner for Trade Valdis Dombrovskis. The Council meets at least once a year, called by the chairs.

== Work ==
The Council is tasked with helping to meet economic partnership objectives and harmonize regulations. Other priorities include: road safety, and petrol conservation, cosmetics testing (finding alternatives to animal testing), technologies, and more cooperation. However the Council has been criticised as getting bogged down in minor details and failing to produce results.

At a TEC meeting on 17 December 2010 in Washington, D.C., the leaders released a U.S.-EU Transatlantic Economic Council Joint Statement committing all parties to deeper transatlantic cooperation on secure trade and supply chain security policies. This was followed by an EU / United States joint statement on supply chain security signed in Brussels on 23 June 2011.

== See also ==
- Agreement on Reciprocal, Fair, and Balanced Trade – proposed Free Trade agreement
- Transatlantic Free Trade Area
- Transatlantic Trade and Investment Partnership – proposed Free Trade agreement
- United States–European Union relations
