= EU-U.S. trade agreement =

Proposed free trade agreement between the EU and the US

EU–U.S. trade agreement
European Union-United States Framework on an Agreement on Reciprocal, Fair, and Balanced Trade
- The United States (orange) and the European Union (green)
- Type: Trade agreement
- Drafted: 21 August 2025
- Signed: 25 September 2025; 25 June 2026
- Effective: 1 August 2025; 1 September 2025; 1 July 2026
- Original signatories: (European Union) Antonio Costa; (European Union) Roberta Metsola; (United States) Jamieson Greer; (United States) William Kimmitt
- Parties: European Union; United States

Full text
- Joint Statement on a United States-European Union Framework on an Agreement on Reciprocal Fair and Balanced Trade at Wikisource

The European Union-United States Framework on an Agreement on Reciprocal, Fair, and Balanced Trade, informally called the EU–U.S. trade agreement, is a trade agreement between the European Union (EU) and the United States. A framework agreement was announced in a joint statement on 21 August 2025. The framework agreement provides for 15% tariffs on all European exports and 0% tariffs on certain US exports. It was replaced the previous Transatlantic Trade and Investment Partnership (TTIP) efforts.

US tariffs were effective 1 August or 1 September 2025, depending on the category. EU tariffs were effective 1 July 2026.

The agreement exposed European Commission President Ursula von der Leyen to substantial criticism. French Prime Minister François Bayrou called it a "submission", while German Chancellor Friedrich Merz said the deal would significantly damage Germany's finances.

As a result of the Greenland crisis and Trump's threats of a trade war against several EU and NATO members in retaliation for their participation in the Operation Arctic Endurance NATO exercise in Greenland, the approval of the agreement was temporarily suspended. On 26 March 2026, EU lawmakers advanced legislation to implement the trade agreement.

== Tariffs ==
The US is imposing a 15% tariff on almost all EU goods, MFN tariffs for unavailable natural resources, aircraft, and generic pharmaceuticals, capping combined MFN + Section 232 tariffs at 15% for pharmaceuticals, semiconductors, and lumber, while leaving metals at 50% above quotas.

== Non-tariff barriers ==
As part of the framework agreement, the EU committed to ensuring that the Corporate Sustainability Due Diligence Directive (CSDDD) and the Corporate Sustainability Reporting Directive (CSRD) did not pose undue restrictions on trade, including reducing administrative burdens and proposing changes for a harmonised civil liability regime for due diligence failures, committed to provide additional flexibilities for US companies in its Carbon Border Adjustment Mechanism (CBAM), and committed to avoid any undue impact of the Regulation on Deforestation-free Products (EUDR).

With respect to cars the US and EU intend to accept and provide mutual recognition to each other's standards. They commit to boosting technical cooperation between standards bodies and expand conformity assessment recognition across industrial sectors. They also commit to streamlining sanitary certificate requirements for pork and dairy products.

== Investment ==
European states committed to $750 billion in energy purchases and $600 billion in additional investments in the United States. However, this commitment is non-binding and not part of the formal trade agreement.

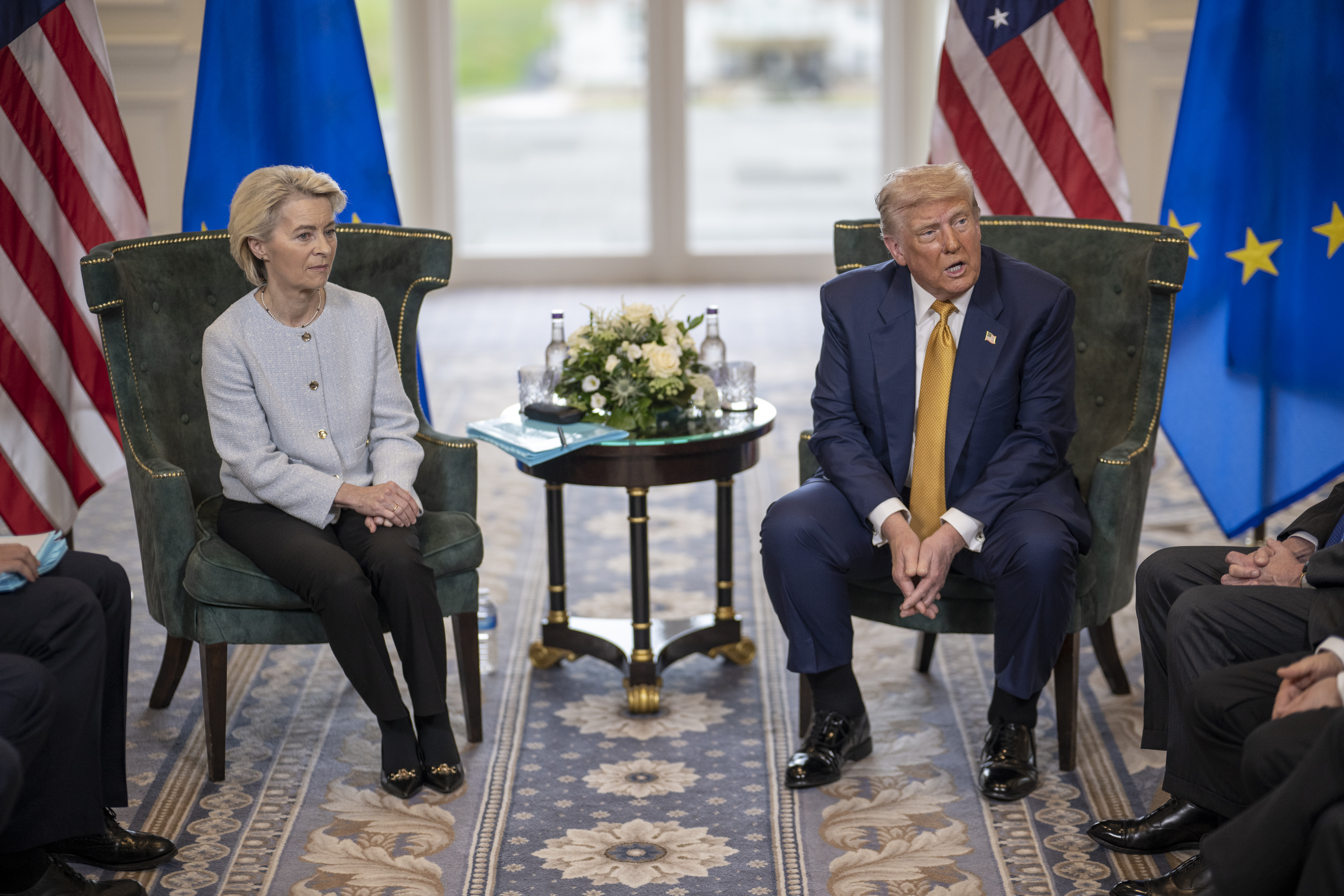
A political agreement was announced in July 2025.

== History ==
In August 2020, the EU and US agreed, for the first time in two decades, to reduce certain tariffs (on a most favoured nation basis, meaning the tariffs are dropped for all trading partners). But in 2025, US president Trump stated his intention to reduce the US trade deficit and achieve "energy dominance". He linked the two goals in April, calling on the European Union to buy $350 billion in American energy to eliminate its trade surplus with the United States. The EU faced a 20 percent tariff if it fails to reach a deal with Trump.

On 27 July 2025, the United States and the European Union reached a political agreement on a trade agreement, announced by US president Trump and EU Commission president Von der Leyen at Turnberry, Scotland. After the agreement, French Prime Minister François Bayrou called it a "submission", while German Chancellor Friedrich Merz said the deal would significantly damage his country's finances.

On 28 August the Commission put forward regulations for the Parliament and Council to enact the EU's tariff reductions, a necessary step for the US to retroactively lower its tariffs on EU cars to 15% from 1 August. On 5 September, President Trump signed an executive order amending the reciprocal tariff program and expanding executive agencies' authority to implement the framework agreement and future final trade and security agreements. On 25 September, the US International Trade Administration and Office of the United States Trade Representative amended the Harmonized Tariff Schedule to implement the agreement, effective from 1 August or 1 September depending on the category.

As a result of the Greenland crisis and Trump's threats of economic warfare against EU and NATO members in retaliation for their participation in the Operation Arctic Endurance NATO exercise in Greenland, EU leaders said the approval of the agreement cannot proceed. On 21 January 2026, the European Parliament suspended the approval of a key US trade deal agreed in July in protest against Donald Trump's demand to take over Greenland. The suspension was announced in Strasbourg, France, on Wednesday, as the US president addressed the World Economic Forum in Davos.

On 19 March 2026, the European Parliament's trade committee agreed to eliminate most tariffs on industrial and agricultural goods from the US, adopting two legislative proposals by 29 votes in favor, 9 against and 1 abstention, thus bringing the EU–US trade agreement closer to implementation. On 26 March, the European Parliament approved the agreement, which included a suspension clause, sunrise clause, and sunset clause, with 417 votes in favour, 154 against, and 71 abstentions. Trilogue meetings began on the week of 13 April. On 19 May, Parliament and Council reached an agreement.

On 16 June 2026, Parliament approved the regulation by a vote of 440–151–50. On 25 June the regulation was signed by the Parliament president and Council president.
