= Transatlantic Trade and Investment Partnership =

Proposed free trade agreement between the EU and the US

- The United States (orange) and the European Union (green)
- Type: Trade agreement
- Signed: No

The Transatlantic Trade and Investment Partnership (TTIP) was a proposed trade agreement between the European Union (EU) and the United States, with the aim of promoting trade and multilateral economic growth. According to Karel De Gucht, European Commissioner for Trade between 2010 and 2014, the TTIP would have been the largest bilateral trade initiative ever negotiated, not only because it would have involved the two largest economic areas in the world but also "because of its potential global reach in setting an example for future partners and agreements".

Negotiations were halted by United States president Donald Trump, who then initiated a trade conflict with the EU. Trump and the EU declared a truce of sorts in July 2018, resuming talks that appeared similar to TTIP. On 15 April 2019, the negotiations were declared "obsolete and no longer relevant" by the European Commission. It was superseded in 2025 by negotiations for an Agreement on Reciprocal, Fair, and Balanced Trade.

The European Commission claimed that the TTIP would have boosted the EU's economy by €120 billion, the US economy by €90 billion and the rest of the world by €100 billion. According to Anu Bradford, law professor at Columbia Law School, and Thomas J. Bollyky of the Council on Foreign Relations, TTIP aimed to "liberalise one-third of global trade" and could create millions of new jobs. A Guardian article by Dean Baker of the US thinktank Center for Economic and Policy Research argued that the economic benefits per household would be relatively small. According to a European Parliament report, impacts on labour conditions range from job gains to job losses, depending on economic model and assumptions used for predictions.

The reports on the past negotiations and the contents of the negotiated TTIP proposals are classified information, and can be accessed only by authorised persons. Multiple leaks of proposed TTIP contents into the public caused controversy. The proposed agreement had been criticized and opposed by some unions, charities, NGOs and environmentalists, particularly in Europe.

The Independent describes common criticisms of TTIP as "reducing the regulatory barriers to trade for big business, things like food safety law, environmental legislation, banking regulations and the sovereign powers of individual nations", or more critically as an "assault on European and US societies by transnational corporations". The Guardian noted the criticism of TTIP's "undemocratic nature of the closed-door talks", "influence of powerful lobbyists", TTIP's potential ability to "undermine the democratic authority of local government", and described it as "the most controversial trade deal the EU has ever negotiated". German economist Max Otte argued that by putting European workers into direct competition with Americans, TTIP would negatively impact the European social models. An EU direct democracy mechanism, the European Citizens' Initiative, which enables EU citizens to call directly on the European Commission to propose a legal act, acquired over 3.2 million signatures against TTIP and CETA within a year.

== Background ==
Economic barriers between the EU and the United States are relatively low, not only due to long-standing membership in the World Trade Organization (WTO) but also recent agreements such as the EU–US Open Skies Agreement and work by the Transatlantic Economic Council. The European Commission claimed that passage of a trans-Atlantic trade pact could boost overall trade between the respective blocs by as much as 50%. Economic gains from a Trade Treaty were predicted in the joint report issued by the White House and the European Commission.

Some form of Transatlantic Free Trade Area had been proposed in the 1990s and later in 2006 by German Chancellor Angela Merkel in reaction to the collapse of the Doha world trade talks. However, protectionism on both sides may be a barrier to any future agreement. It was first initiated in 1990, when, shortly after the end of the Cold War, with the world no longer divided into two blocs, the European Community (12 countries) and the US signed a "Transatlantic Declaration". This called for the continued existence of the North Atlantic Treaty Organization, as well as for yearly summits, biannual meetings between ministers of State, and more frequent encounters between political figures and senior officials.

Subsequent initiatives taken by the European deciders and the US government included: in 1995, the creation of a pressure group of business people, the Transatlantic Business Dialogue (TABD) by public authorities on both sides of the Atlantic; in 1998, the creation of an advisory committee, the Transatlantic Economic Partnership; in 2007, the creation of the Transatlantic Economic Council, in which representatives from firms operating on both sides of the Atlantic meet to advise the European Commission and the US government – and finally, in 2011, the creation of a group of high-level experts whose conclusions, submitted on 11 February 2013, recommended the launching of negotiations for a wide-ranging free-trade agreement. On 12 February 2013, President Barack Obama called in his annual State of the Union address for such an agreement. The following day, EU Commission President Jose Manuel Barroso announced that talks would take place to negotiate the agreement.

The United States and European Union together represent 60% of global GDP, 33% of world trade in goods and 42% of world trade in services. There are a number of trade conflicts between the two powers, but both depend on the other's economic market and disputes only affect 2% of total trade. A free trade area between the two would represent potentially the largest regional free-trade agreement in history, covering 46% of world GDP.

Trade between the EU and the US (in billion euros) (2018)
Direction	Goods	Services	Investment	Total
EU to US	351	179	1655	2181
US to EU	213	196	1536	1806

The United States investment in the European Union is three times greater than US investment in the entire continent of Asia and EU investment in the United States is eight times that of European Union investment in India and China combined. Intra-company transfers are estimated to constitute a third of all transatlantic trade. The United States and European Union are the largest trading partners of most other countries in the world and account for a third of world trade flows. Given the already low tariff barriers (under 3%), to make the deal a success the aim is to remove non-tariff barriers.

== Proposed contents ==
Documents released by the European Commission in July 2014 group the topics under discussion into three broad areas: market access; specific regulation; and broader rules and principles and modes of co-operation.

The EU negotiating mandate as of June 2013 gave a fuller view of what the Council of the European Union (Foreign Affairs) has told its negotiators to try to achieve for each section. No corresponding US text is available, but the American side has released a public statement setting out its objectives and the potential benefits it foresees.

The secret contents of the first concrete American proposal on tariff reduction, and an EU counterproposal, which was leaked to Correctiv in February 2016, suggest 87.5% to 97% of all tariffs would be cut to zero.

=== Market access ===
TTIP includes chapters on market access for goods and services that aim to remove "custom duties on goods and restrictions on services, gaining better access to public markets, and making it easier to invest". The goods part includes rules on market access for goods, agriculture and processed agricultural products, and rules of origin.

==== Services and leaked text ====
For "Trade in Services, Investment and E-commerce", a draft text dated 7 July 2013 was leaked by the German newspaper Die Zeit in March 2014. The leaked text contains seven chapters. In Chapter 1, Article 1 states the overall objective of "a better climate for the development of trade and investment", particularly the "liberalisation of investment and cooperation on e-commerce".

Chapter II, Article 3 to Article 18 contains general principles for investment. Article 14 contains proposed rules that forbid governments to "directly or indirectly nationalise, expropriate" unless it is for a public purpose, under due process of law, on a non-discriminatory basis, with compensation. Article 14(2) defines the necessary compensation as being "fair market value of the investment at the time immediately before the expropriation or the impending expropriation became public knowledge plus interest at a commercial rate established on a market basis".

Chapter III, Articles 19 to 23 contains rules on cross border supply of services.

Chapter IV, Articles 24 to 28 would allow free movement of business managers, and other employees of a corporation, for temporary work purposes among all countries party to the agreement. Article 1(2) makes it clear, however, that no more general free movement of workers and citizens is allowed.

Chapter V contains eight sections with particular rules for different economic sectors. Section I, articles 29 to 31, set out principles that states must follow in licensing private corporations, and state that requirements that are not proportionate to a reviewable public policy objective are contrary to the treaty. Section II contains general provisions. Section III covers computer services. Section IV, articles 35 to 39, cover liberalisation of postal services. Section V, articles 40 to 50, apply to electronic communications networks and services (including telecommunications) and mandate competitive markets, absence of cross-subsidies, subject to defined exceptions including in article 46 a right (but not a requirement) for countries to provide universal service.

Section VI of chapter V covers financial services, in articles 51 to 59. It limits the laws that governments can pass to regulate or publicly run insurance and banking. Any regulations that do not fall within the Treaty's terms and objectives would be unlawful. Legitimate reasons for regulation include, in article 52, "the protection of investors, depositors, policy-holders or persons to whom a fiduciary duty is owed by a financial service supplier; (b) ensuring the integrity and stability of a Party's financial system". However article 52(2) states "measures shall not be more burdensome than necessary to achieve their aim", and the Treaty does not include any further reasons to allow regulation. Section VII covers international maritime transport and section VIII covers air transport.

The Annex on "Investors-state dispute settlement" proposed to allow corporations to bring actions against governments for breach of their rights. The European Commission launched a public consultation after the draft text was leaked, which led to a number of changes. However, an updated proposed text had yet to be made publicly available. In September 2015, the Commission proposed an "Investment Court System" to replace the ISDS clauses, with the scope for investor challenge much reduced and with "highly skilled judges" rather than arbitrators used to determine cases.

=== Industry-specific regulation ===
"Improved regulatory coherence and cooperation by dismantling unnecessary regulatory barriers such as bureaucratic duplication of effort".

Specific heads for discussion include:

- Horizontal chapters:
  - Regulatory coherence
  - Technical barriers to trade
- Specific sectoral agreements:
  - Textiles
  - Chemicals
  - Pharmaceuticals
  - Cosmetics
  - Medical devices
  - Cars
  - Electronics and information technology
  - Machinery and engineering
  - Pesticides
  - Sanitary and phytosanitary measures (SPS)—i.e., barriers to trade in food and agricultural products

=== Broader rules and principles and modes of co-operation ===
"Improved cooperation when it comes to setting international standards".

Specific heads for discussion include:

- Energy and raw materials
- Trade and sustainable development / labour and environment
- Public procurement
- Intellectual property
  - Geographical indications
- Competition policy: antitrust and mergers
  - Treatment of state-owned or subsidised companies vis-a-vis private companies
- Small and medium-sized enterprises (SMEs)
- Trade remedies: e.g., anti-dumping practices
- Customs and trade facilitation

=== Implementation ===
- Dispute settlement (between the parties, not investor-state dispute settlement)

== Negotiations ==
=== Procedure ===
The TTIP Agreement texts were developed by 24 joint EU-US working groups, each considering a separate aspect of the agreement. Development typically progresses through a number of phases. Broad position papers are first exchanged, introducing each side's aims and ambitions for each aspect. These are followed by textual proposals from each side, accompanied (in areas such as tariffs, and market access) by each side's "initial offer". These negotiations and draft documents can evolve (change) through the various stages of their development. When both sides are ready, a consolidated text is prepared, with remaining differences for discussion expressed in square brackets. These texts are then provisionally closed topic by topic as a working consensus is reached. However the agreement is negotiated as a whole, so no topic's text is finalised until full consensus is reached.

=== Negotiation rounds ===
Negotiations are held in week-long cycles alternating between Brussels and the US. The negotiators were hoping to conclude their work by the end of 2016.

- The 1st round of negotiations: 7–12 July 2013 in Washington, DC
- The 2nd round of negotiations: 11–15 November 2013 in Brussels
- The 3rd round of negotiations: 16–21 December 2013 in Washington, DC
- The 4th round of negotiations: 10–14 March 2014 in Brussels
- The 5th round of negotiations: 19–23 May 2014 in Arlington, Virginia
- The 6th round of negotiations: 13–18 July 2014 in Brussels
- The 7th round of negotiations: 29 September – 3 October 2014 in Chevy Chase, Maryland
- The 8th round of negotiations: 2–6 February 2015 in Brussels
- The 9th round of negotiations: 20–24 April 2015 in New York
- The 10th round of negotiations: 13–17 July 2015 in Brussels
- The 11th round of negotiations: 19–23 October 2015 in Miami
- The 12th round of negotiations: 22–26 February 2016 in Brussels
- The 13th round of negotiations: 25–29 April 2016 in New York
- The 14th round of negotiations: 11–15 July 2016 in Brussels
- The 15th round of negotiations: 3–7 October 2016 in New York

=== Confidentiality measures ===
Only a few people could access the documents known as "consolidated texts", the drafts containing the most recent results of the negotiations. On the European side, authorised readers included the European Commission negotiators (most of them from the Directorate-General for Trade), MEPs and European Union members' MPs. Upon the insistence of the US, the documents are not transmitted any more as electronic or even printed documents.

They were only available in secure rooms at the European Commission HQ in Brussels, in a number of US embassies, and at the offices of member states' trade ministries. In all the secured rooms phones or other types of scanning device are forbidden. Blank sheets of paper, marked with the reader's names, are provided on which visitors can jot down their notes. On the US side, the procedure was similar: only Senators and USTR negotiators could access the documents and had to comply with similar conditions. The United States insisted on the same security arrangements for the drafts of the Trans-Pacific Partnership proposal.

=== Hurdles ===
The negotiations were planned to be finalized by the end of 2014, but according to economist Hosuk Lee-Makiyama, at least another four or five years of negotiations remained at the end of that year. In November 2014 the Bulgarian government announced that it will not ratify the agreement unless the United States lifted visa requirements for Bulgarian citizens.

German Vice Chancellor and Economy Minister Sigmar Gabriel said that free trade talks between the European Union and the United States have failed, citing a lack of progress on any of the major sections of the long-running negotiations. "In my opinion the negotiations with the United States have de facto failed, even though nobody is really admitting it" the German broadcaster Zweites Deutsches Fernsehen quoted the minister, according to a written transcript of an interview aired on 28 August 2016. "[They] have failed because we Europeans did not want to subject ourselves to American demands."

=== Negotiation progress before withdrawal ===
Negotiation progress as of 27 April 2016:

No paper yet	US/EU Paper	EU & US proposals	Consolidation underway	Advanced state of consolidation
Agricultural Market Access
Anti-corruption
Competition
Cross-Border Trade in Services
Customs and Trade Facilitation
E-commerce
Energy and Raw Materials
Financial Services
Investment Protection
Intellectual Property Rights
Legal and Institutional
Market access/Industrial goods
Procurement
Regulatory Coherence
Regulatory Cooperation
Rules of Origin
Small and medium-sized enterprises
State-owned enterprises
Sanitary and Phytosanitary Measures
State-to-State Dispute Settlement
Subsidies
Sustainable dev.: Labour, Environment
Technical Barriers to Trade
Telecom
Textiles and Apparel
Trade Remedies
Sectors

== Failed ratification ==
The 27 European Union-member governments would have had to approve of the partnership, via unanimous voting under TFEU Articles 207 and 218, on the negotiated agreement in the Council of the European Union, at which point the European Parliament would also have been asked for its endorsement. The European Parliament was empowered to approve or reject the agreement. The Council of the European Union, following a proposal from the European Commission, designated TTIP to be a "mixed agreement", so approval from all Parliaments of the EU Member States in accordance with individual constitutional procedures would have been necessary before the agreement could enter into force.

In the United States, both houses of the Congress would have had to pass the agreement for it to be ratified. Negotiations were halted by United States president Donald Trump, who then initiated a trade conflict with the EU. Trump and the EU declared a truce of sorts in July 2018, resuming talks that appeared similar to TTIP. On 15 April 2019, the negotiations were declared "obsolete and no longer relevant" by the European Commission.

== Proposed benefits ==
TTIP aimed for a formal agreement that would "liberalize one-third of global trade" and, proponents argued, would create millions of new paid jobs. "With tariffs between the United States and the European Union already low, the London-based Centre for Economic Policy Research estimates that 80 percent of the potential economic gains from the TTIP agreement depend on reducing the conflicts of duplication between EU and US rules on those and other regulatory issues, ranging from food safety to automobile parts." A successful strategy (according to Thomas Bollyky at the Council on Foreign Relations and Anu Bradford of Columbia Law School) will focus on business sectors for which transatlantic trade laws and local regulations can often overlap, e.g., pharmaceutical, agricultural, and financial trading. This will ensure that the United States and Europe remain "standard makers, rather than standard takers", in the global economy, subsequently ensuring that producers worldwide continue to gravitate toward joint US-EU standards.

In March 2013, an economic assessment by the European Centre for Economic Policy Research estimates that such a comprehensive agreement would result in GDP growth of 68–119 billion euros for the European Union by 2027 and GDP growth of 50–95 billion euros (about 53.5–101 billion US dollars) in the United States in the same time frame. The 2013 report also estimates that a limited agreement focused only on tariffs would yield EU GDP growth of 24 billion euros by 2027 and growth of 9 billion euros in the United States. If shared equally among the affected people, the most optimistic GDP growth estimates would translate into "additional annual disposable income for a family of four" of "545 euros in the EU" and "655 euros in the US", respectively.

In a Wall Street Journal article, the CEO of Siemens AG (with its workforce located 70% in Europe and 30% in the United States) claimed that the TTIP would strengthen United States and EU global competitiveness by reducing trade barriers, by improving intellectual property protections, and by establishing new international "rules of the road".

The European Commission says that the TTIP would boost the EU's economy by €120 billion, the US economy by €90 billion and the rest of the world by €100 billion. Talks began in July 2013 and reached the third round of negotiations by the end of that year.

American economist Dean Baker of the Center for Economic and Policy Research observed that with conventional trade barriers between the US and the EU already low, the deal would focus on non-conventional barriers, such as overriding national regulations on fracking, GMOs, and finance, but also tightening laws on copyright. He goes on to assert that, with less ambitious projections, the economic benefits per household are unimpressive: "If we apply the projected income gain of 0.21% to the projected median personal income in 2027, it comes to a bit more than $50 a year. That's a little less than 15 cents a day. Don't spend it all in one place".

A 2018 paper by KU Leuven economists estimated that a "deep" free-trade agreement, such as TTIP, between the United States and the European Union would increase EU GDP by 1.3% and US GDP by 0.7%. These gains would primarily be the result of reductions in non-tariff barriers to trade.

== Criticism and opposition ==
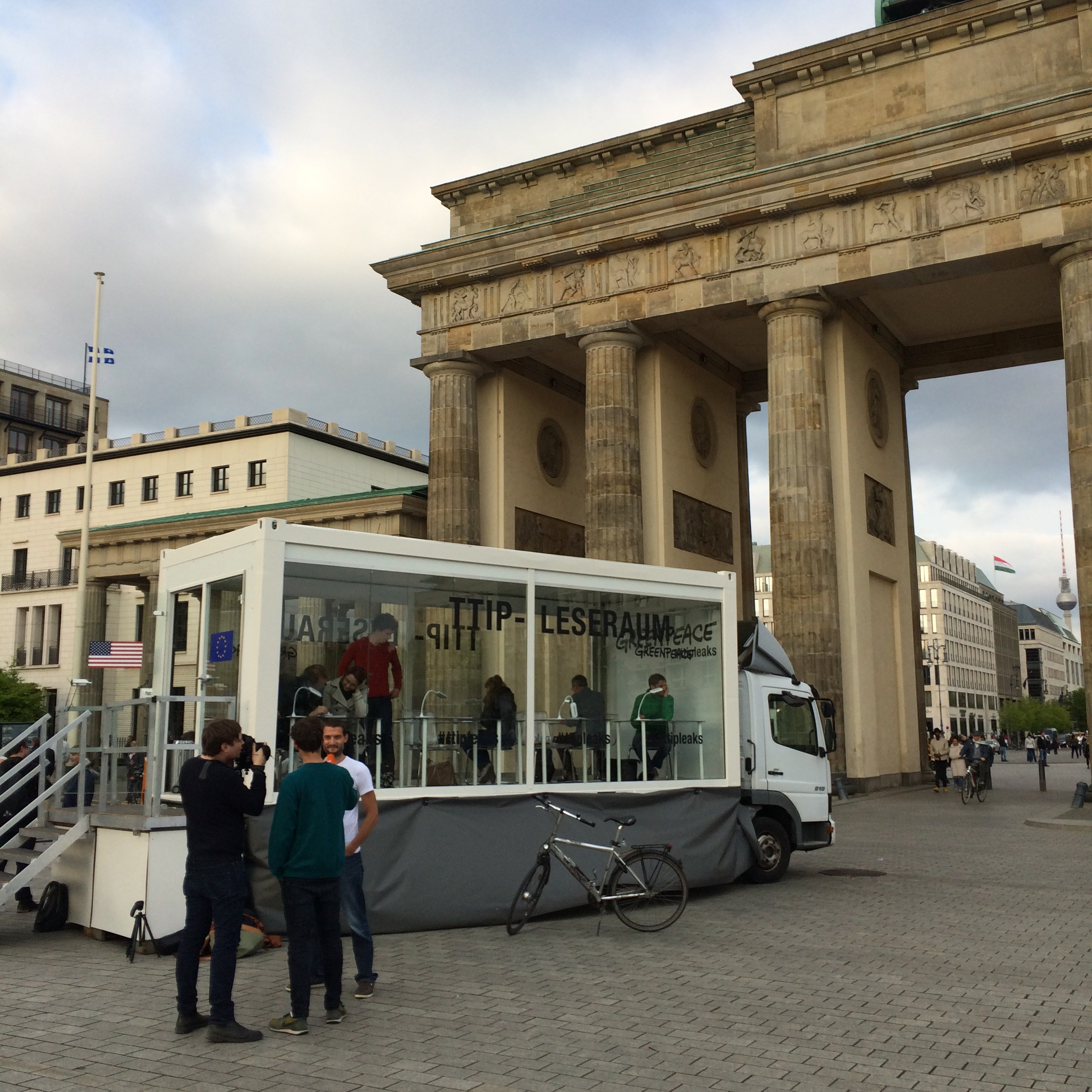
Greenpeace opened a transparent public reading room for TTIP documents at Brandenburg Gate, Berlin, Germany.

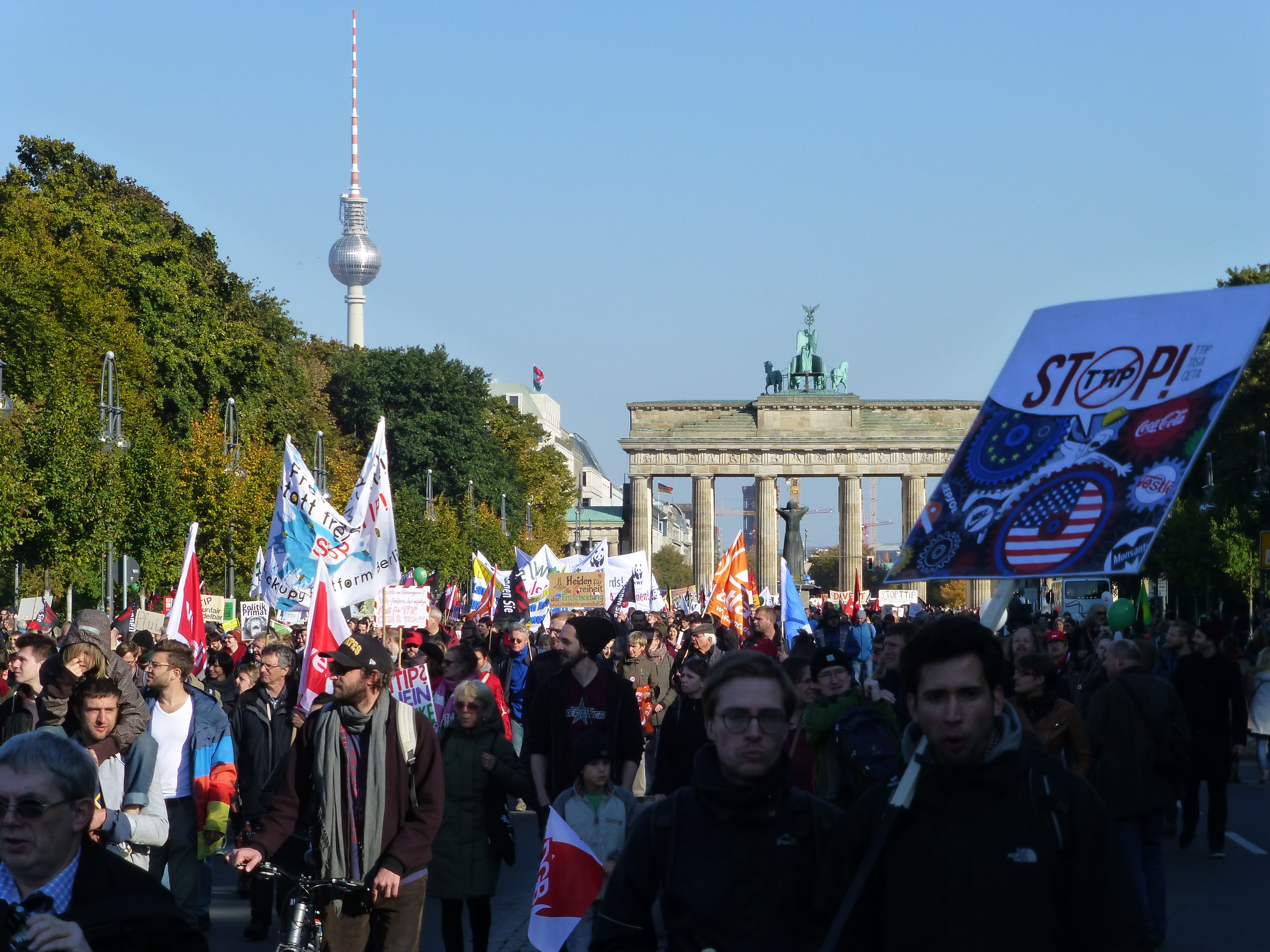
The STOP TTIP CETA demo in Berlin in October 2015 had around 250,000 participants.

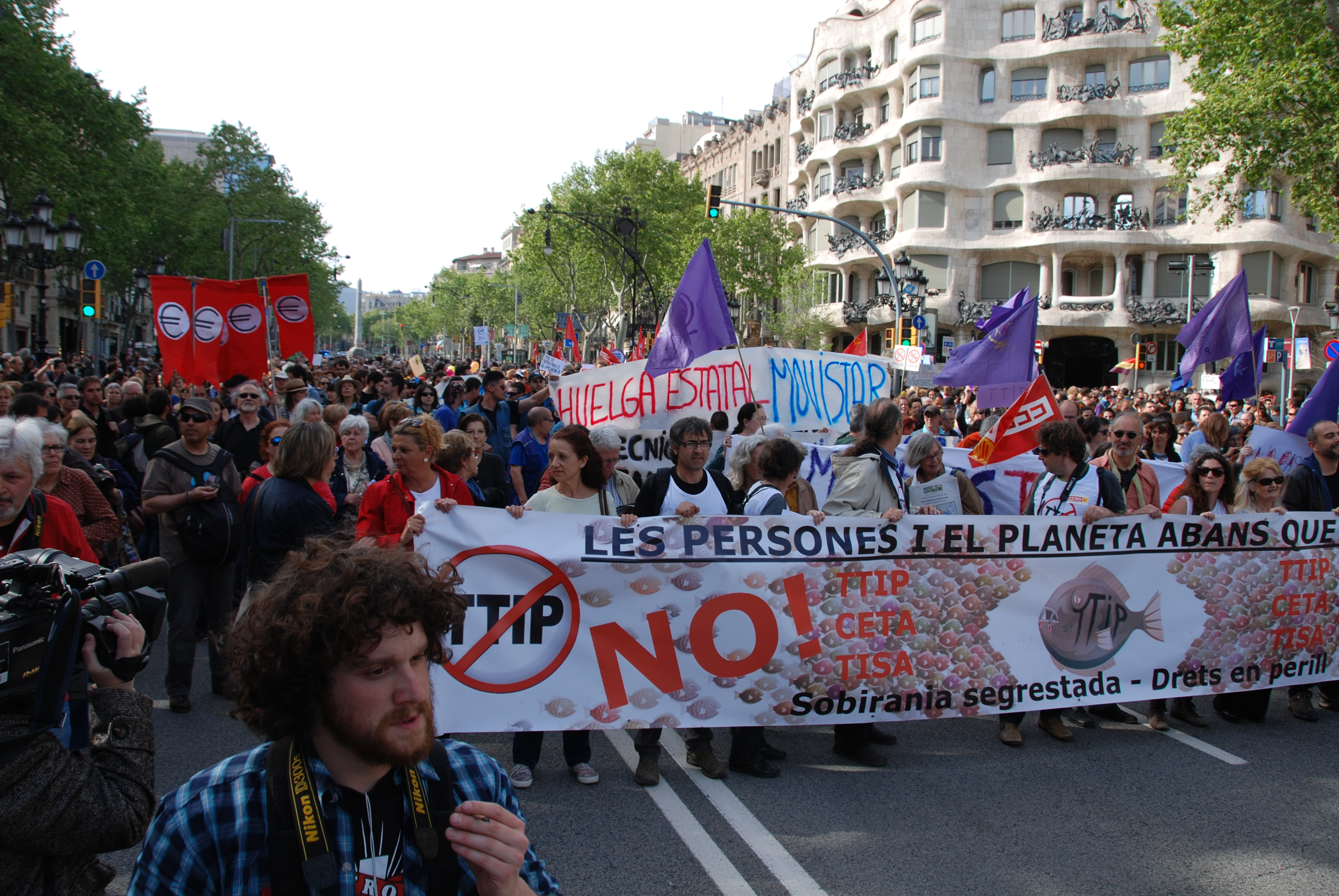
"Stop TTIP" protests in Barcelona, Spain, 18 April 2015

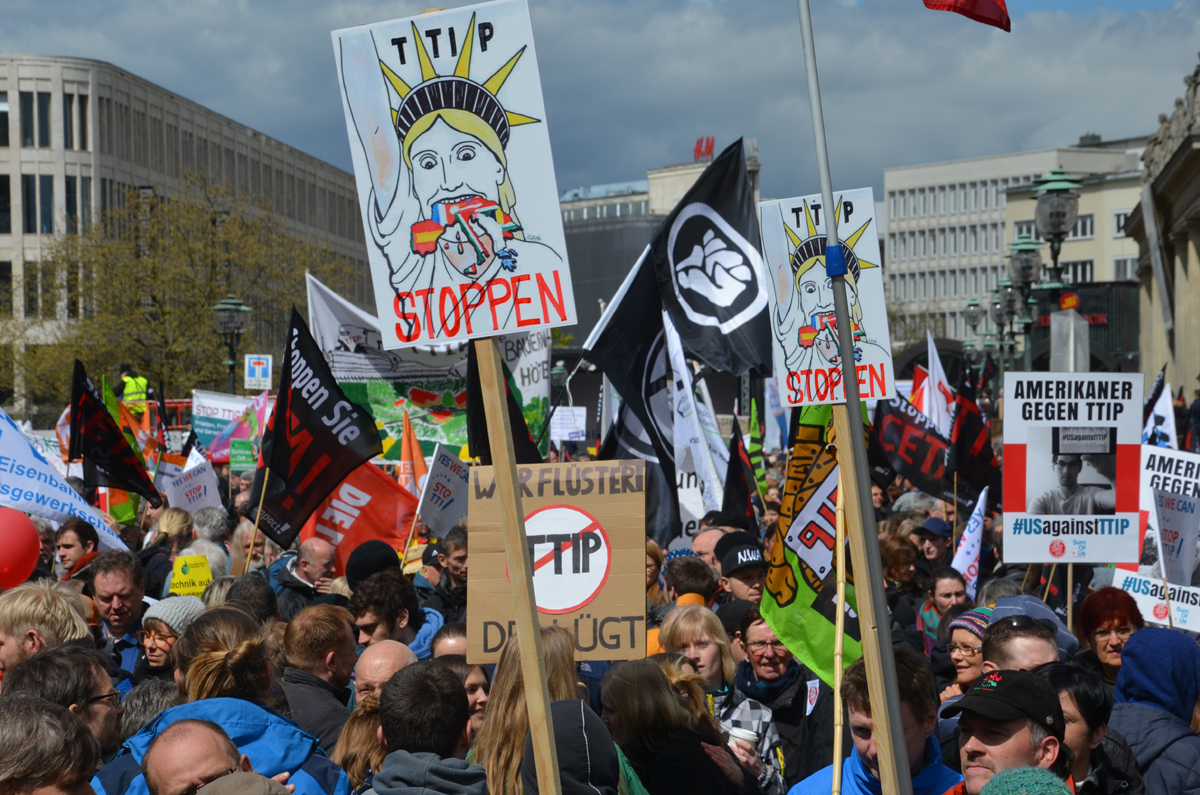
Anti-TTIP demonstration in Hannover, Germany, 23 April 2016

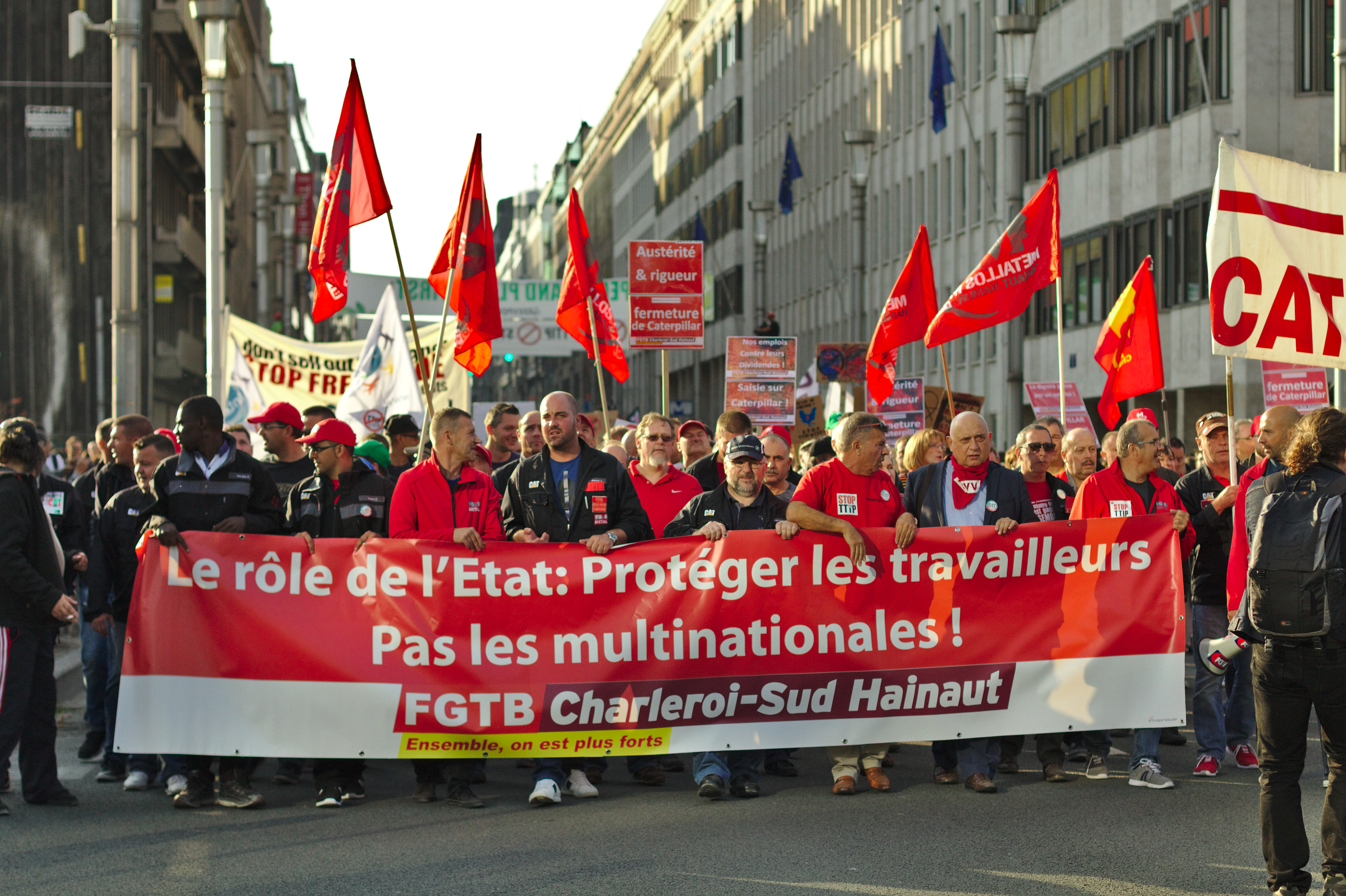
The Stop TTIP-CETA protest in Brussels, Belgium, 20 September 2016

=== Secrecy of content and negotiations ===
The content of the drafts of agreement, as well as the reports on negotiation rounds, are classified from the public, an arrangement that The Independent criticised as "secretive and undemocratic". As noted above, elected representatives may only view the texts in a secure "reading room" in Brussels, to avoid any further leaks of information about TTIP negotiations into the public domain.

To answer the criticism, and months after their leaks by Greenpeace, the European Commission has made negotiation documents public, including all EU proposals in the regulatory and rules components of the agreement. The Trade Commissioner has described the negotiations as "the most transparent trade talks ever conducted by the EU".

=== Potential negative impacts ===
==== Politics, economy and society ====
The Guardian described TTIP as "the most controversial trade deal the EU has ever negotiated". TTIP negotiations are criticized and opposed by some unions, charities, NGOs and environmentalists, particularly in Europe. The Independent summarizes the negative impact of TTIP as "reducing the regulatory barriers to trade for big business, things like food safety law, environmental legislation, banking regulations and the sovereign powers of individual nations", or more critically as an "assault on European and US societies by transnational corporations". German economist Max Otte stated that the proposed (ISDS) court of arbitration and protection of foreign investment would mean a "complete dis-empowerment of politics" and that, regarding labour economics, free trade agreements typically enforce lower standards and that TTIP would put European workers into direct competition with Americans (and in effect because of the North American Free Trade Agreement with Mexicans), which would impact European social models. Otte also concluded: "We really don't want the social system of these countries [United States and Mexico] here [in Europe]."

An October 2014 study by Jeronim Capaldo of the Global Development and Environment Institute at Tufts University indicates that there will be losses in terms of net exports, net losses in terms of GDP, loss of labour income, job losses, reduction of the labour share, loss of government revenue and higher financial instability among European countries.

In his 2016 article The Gift in the Age of TTIP: the form and sense of exchange in an archaic civilization, Chris Hann stated that by adopting TTIP, the EU is complicit in market-driven global degradation, which, in turn, pushes Eurasian neighbors into deeper spirals of repression.

==== Labour standards, workers' rights and job security ====
Anti-poverty group Global Justice Now asserts that TTIP would undermine job security as well as current minimum labour standards agreed in the EU. British Labour Party politician John McDonnell, former Shadow Chancellor of the Exchequer, has described TTIP as resulting in a huge transfer of powers to Brussels and corporate interests that will bring about a form of "modern-day serfdom". According to a European Parliament report, impacts on labour conditions range from job gains to job losses, depending on economic model and assumptions used for predictions.

In spite of a study by the Munich-based Ifo Institute for Economic Research (on behalf of the German Federal Ministry of Economics) claiming that up to 400,000 jobs could be created in the EU by TTIP, Stefan Körzell, national board member of the Confederation of German Trade Unions (DGB) has said "Whether TTIP can create jobs, and 'how many' and 'where' is unclear. Previous studies, ranging from those conducted by the European Commission across to the expertise of the Ifo Institute, fluctuate between optimism and very low expectations... Consideration of the negative consequences trade agreements can have, if environmental or labour standards are ignored, is often omitted. As of August 2015, the US had ratified two (prohibitions of child labour and slavery) of the eight ILO core labour standards."

==== Democracy and national sovereignty, foreign investor protection ====
Investor-state dispute settlement (ISDS) is an instrument that allows an investor to bring a case directly against the country hosting its investment, without the intervention of the government of the investor's country of origin. From the late 1980s, certain trade treaties have included provisions for ISDS that allow foreign investors who claim to have been disadvantaged by actions of a signatory state, to sue that state for damages in a tribunal of arbitration. More recently such claims have increased in number and value, and some states have become increasingly resistant to such clauses.

Critics of TTIP say that "ISDS provisions undermine the power of national governments to act in the interests of their citizens", that "TTIP could even undermine the democratic authority of local government", and that it threatens democracy. France and Germany have said that they want access to investor-state dispute settlement removed from the TTIP treaty. In December 2013, a coalition of over 200 environmentalists, labor unions and consumer advocacy organizations on both sides of the Atlantic sent a letter to the USTR and European Commission demanding the investor-state dispute settlement be dropped from the trade talks, claiming that ISDS was "a one-way street by which corporations can challenge government policies, but neither governments nor individuals are granted any comparable rights to hold corporations accountable". Some point out the "potential for abuse" that may be inherent in the trade agreement due to its clauses relating to investor protection. A recent study shows that investor-state dispute settlement (ISDS) indeed generates strikingly large and consistent opposition to the trade agreement and this effect of dispute settlement characteristic cuts across individuals’ key attributes, including skill levels, information, and national sentiment, which have been viewed as key determinants of trade attitudes.

In December 2013, Martti Koskenniemi, Professor of International Law at the University of Helsinki, warned that the planned foreign investor protection scheme within the treaty, similar to World Bank Group's International Centre for Settlement of Investment Disputes (ICSID), would endanger the sovereignty of the signatory states by allowing for a small circle of legal experts sitting in a foreign court of arbitration an unprecedented power to interpret and void the signatory states' legislation.

Faced with such broad and vociferous criticism, ISDS was abandoned in September 2015; in its place, the European Commission proposed an Investment Court System (ICS). Not long afterwards, ICS was declared illegal by the German Association of Magistrates, though the commission dismissed the magistrates' judgement as based on a misunderstanding. For its part, the United States wants ISDS reinstated.

In February 2016, Labour (UK) leader Jeremy Corbyn said that human rights should be part of TTIP, describing TTIP as a threat to national sovereignty, workers, consumers, health and the environment.

==== Public health and environment ====
According to a report in The Guardian, TTIP draft leaked in 2016 shows "irreconcilable" differences between EU and the US in some areas, with the US demanding that EU compromise its "environmental, consumer protection and public health standards".

===== Consumer protection and food safety =====
Documents released in May 2015 showed that US negotiators had pressured the EU over proposed pesticide criteria. A number of pesticides containing endocrine disrupting chemicals were forbidden in draft EU criteria. On 2 May 2013, US negotiators insisted the EU drop the criteria. They stated that a risk-based approach should be taken on regulation. Later the same day Catherine Day (Secretary-General of the European Commission) wrote to Karl Falkenberg (Director General for the Environment) asking for these criteria to be removed. As of 2015, 82 pesticides used in the US were banned in Europe and US animal welfare standards are generally lower than those in Europe.

A columnist in The Guardian stated that food safety in the EU might be compromised because of low or different standards in US food regulations, if currently EU-banned food were allowed to be imported. In June 2015, the BBC reported that food safety had become "a stumbling block" because of differing US and EU attitudes to genetically modified crops, pesticides (endocrine disrupting chemicals), growth promoting hormones in beef and pathogen reduction treatments of chicken, that cause public health concerns for consumers and put European farmers at a cost disadvantage. Ban on animal testing in the EU has been described by The Guardian as "irreconcilable" with the US approach.

===== Environment protection and climate change =====
A draft of the sustainable development section of TTIP was leaked to The Guardian in October 2015. Asked to comment on the document, a French environmental attorney described the proposed environmental safeguards as "virtually non-existent" by comparison with the protection granted to investors, and that environmental cases accounted for 60% of the 127 ISDS cases already brought against EU countries under bilateral trade agreements in the last two decades, according to Friends of the Earth Europe. According to Joseph E. Stiglitz, TTIP could have a "chilling" effect on regulation and thus "undercut urgently needed action on climate that the Paris agreement requires". He says that industries that do not pay for the "social costs" of pollution in effect receive hidden subsidies, and that TTIP would give companies many more opportunities to sue governments over environmental protection mechanisms.

The draft energy chapter of the TTIP was leaked to The Guardian in July 2016. According to The Guardian, this draft could "sabotage" European efforts to implement mandatory energy savings measures and to favor the switch to renewable electricity generation. The draft text obliges the two trade blocs to: "foster industry self-regulation of energy efficiency requirements for goods where such self-regulation is likely to deliver the policy objectives faster or in a less costly manner than mandatory requirements". The draft also mandates that operators of energy networks grant access to gas and electricity "on commercial terms that are reasonable, transparent and non-discriminatory, including as between types of energy". This would open feed-in tariff schemes to commercial challenge, including that used by Germany. The Green MEP Claude Turmes stated: "These proposals are completely unacceptable. They would sabotage EU legislators' ability to privilege renewables and energy efficiency over unsustainable fossil fuels. This is an attempt to undermine democracy in Europe."

The EU's draft text for the trade and sustainable development chapter was also leaked to The Guardian in July 2016. The draft, dated 23 June 2016 and marked "restricted", reveals new loopholes on a G20 pledge to phase out inefficient fossil fuel subsidies by 2025. The IMF estimates these subsidies run globally at $10 million per minute and G7 ministers pledged to remove them in May 2016 in a meeting in Japan. The draft however states that "such a phasing out may take into account security of supply considerations". The Guardian believes that this passage could be open to abuse and used to slow the phase out of subsidies.

==== Banking regulation ====
According to critics, TTIP could weaken the stricter bank regulations that are governing banks in the United States as part of the financial reforms that followed the 2008 financial crisis.

==== Intellectual property and privacy ====
Critics of TTIP argue that its proposals on intellectual property and user privacy could have a similar effect as the EU-rejected Anti-Counterfeiting Trade Agreement (ACTA). The Electronic Frontier Foundation and its German counterpart, FFII, in particular, compared TTIP to the ACTA.

=== Activism against TTIP ===
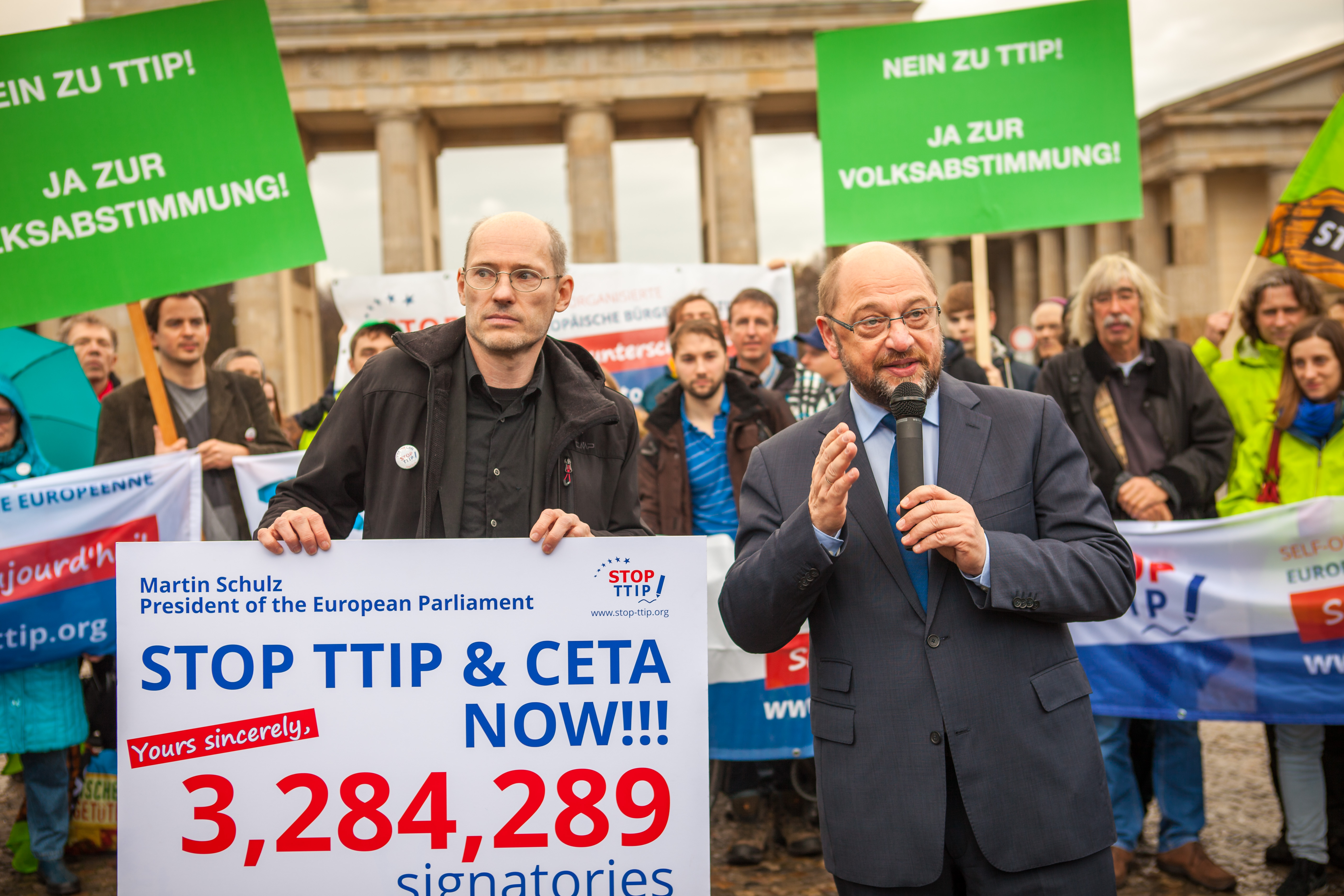
"Stop TTIP" campaigners hand 3,284,289 signatures to Martin Schulz, President of the European Parliament, November 2015.

In March 2013, a coalition of digital rights organisations and other groups issued a declaration in which they called on the negotiating partners to have TTIP "debated in the US Congress, the European Parliament, national parliaments, and other transparent forums" instead of conducting "closed negotiations that give privileged access to corporate insiders", and to leave intellectual property out of the agreement.

In 2014, an online consultation conducted by the European Commission received 150,000 responses. According to the commission, 97% of the responses were pre-defined, negative answers provided by activists. Additionally, hundreds of demonstrations and protests have taken place in an organised "day of action" on 11 October 2014, and again on 18 April 2015. In February 2016, Greenpeace activists blocked secret talks on the Investment Court System.

A self-organised European Citizens' Initiative against TTIP and CETA has also been established, acquiring over 3.2 million signatures within a year.

In April 2016, then-President Barack Obama visited UK, and more than 130,000 people signed a petition organised by political activism group 38 Degrees, urging Obama to stop negotiating TTIP. The group planned to send an open letter to Obama to urge Obama to oppose the pact, saying that TTIP would be a threat to NHS, food standards, animal welfare and democracy because it 'gives corporations more power than people'.

==== Leaks ====
In 2016, Greenpeace published 248 pages of classified documents from the TTIP trade negotiations. Greenpeace Netherlands said it released the documents "to provide much needed transparency and trigger an informed debate on the treaty".

=== National objections ===
From both the European and American sides of the agreement, there were issues which are seen as essential if an accord is to be reached. According to Leif Johan Eliasson of Saarland University, "For the EU these include greater access to the American public procurement market, retained bans on imports of genetically modified organisms (GMO) crops and hormone treated beef, and recognition of geographic trademarks on food products. For the United States they include greater access for American dairy and other agricultural products (including scientific studies as the only accepted criteria for SPS policies)." He observes that measures like the EU ban on hormone treated beef (based as they are on the precautionary principle) are not considered by the WTO to be based on scientific studies.

Eliasson further states that US objectives in a deal include "tariff-free motor vehicle exports", and retained bans on foreign contractors in several areas", including domestic shipping (see Merchant Marine Act of 1920). Already, some American producers are concerned by EU proposals to restrict use of "particular designations" (also known as PDO or GI/geographical indications) that the EU considers location-specific, such as feta and Parmesan cheeses and possibly Budweiser beer. This has provoked debate between European politicians such as Renate Künast and Christian Schmidt over the value of the designations.

At French insistence, trade in audio-visual services was excluded from the EU negotiating mandate. The European side has been pressing for the agreement to include a chapter on the regulation of financial services; but this is being resisted by the American side, which passed the Dodd–Frank Act in this field. US Ambassador to the European Union Anthony L. Gardner has denied any linkage between the two issues.

European negotiators pressed the United States to loosen its restrictions on the export of crude oil and natural gas, to help the EU reduce its dependence on energy from Russia.

=== Response to criticism ===
Karel De Gucht responded to criticism in a Guardian article in December 2013, saying "The commission has regularly consulted a broad range of civil society organisations in writing and in person, and our most recent meeting had 350 participants from trade unions, NGOs and business" and that "no agreement will become law before it is thoroughly examined and signed off by the European parliament and 29 democratically elected national governments – the US government and 28 in the EU's council" However, the Corporate Europe Observatory (cited in the original Guardian article) had pointed out, based on a Freedom of Information request, that "more than 93% of the Commission's meetings with stakeholders during the preparations of the negotiations were with big business". They characterized the industry meetings as "about the EU's preparations of the trade talks", and the civil society consultation as "an information session after the talks were launched".

== Effect on third-party countries ==
A possible future Transatlantic Free Trade Area: the United States and European Union in dark blue and the other possible members in light blue (USMCA and EFTA)

In early 2013, Canadian media observers had speculated that the launch of TTIP talks put pressure on Canada to secure ratification of its own three-year-long FTA negotiations with the EU by the close of 2013. Countries with customs agreements with the EU, like Turkey's, could face the prospect of opening their markets to American goods, without access for their own goods without a separate agreement with the United States.

== Reports ==
Various groups have produced reports about the proposed agreement, including:

- The Politics of Transatlantic Trade Negotiations: TTIP in a Globalized World (2015) ISBN 9781472443649
- The Transatlantic Trade and Investment Partnership: Ambitious but Achievable – A Stakeholder Survey and Three Scenarios (April 2013) ISBN 978-1-61977-032-4
- TTIP and the Fifty States: Jobs and Growth from Coast to Coast (September 2013) ISBN 978-1-61977-038-6
- The Transatlantic Colossus: Global Contributions to Broaden the Debate on the EU-US Free Trade Agreement (December 2013) ISBN 978-3-00-044648-1
- The Transatlantic Trade and Investment Partnership: A Charter for Deregulation, An Attack on Jobs, An End to Democracy (February 2014)

== See also ==
=== Trade agreements ===
- Anti-Counterfeiting Trade Agreement (ACTA)
- Agreement on Reciprocal, Fair, and Balanced Trade
- Comprehensive Economic and Trade Agreement (CETA)
- Trans-Pacific Partnership (TPP)
- Transatlantic Free Trade Area

=== Trade topics ===
- Copyright infringement
- Digital rights
- Investor–state dispute settlement
- Trade in Services Agreement (TISA)
- United States–European Union relations
