= Transatlantic Free Trade Area =

Proposal to lower tariffs between Europe and North America

A Transatlantic Free Trade Agreement (TAFTA) was a proposal to create a free-trade agreement covering Europe and North America, on both sides of the Atlantic Ocean which was permanently abandoned. Such proposals have been made since the 1990s. Between 2013 and about 2017 an agreement between the United States and the European Union (EU) was under negotiation - the Transatlantic Trade and Investment Partnership - but it was abandoned. Canada and Mexico both have free trade agreements with both the EU and European Free Trade Association (EFTA).

== Current and pending trade agreements between proposed members ==
- Comprehensive and Progressive Agreement for Trans-Pacific Partnership (Canada and Mexico along with Australia, Japan, Singapore, New Zealand, Vietnam) - since 2018: The United Kingdom is also attempting to participate since 2021.
- United States–Mexico–Canada Agreement (US, Canada & Mexico) – took effect in 2020
- Canada–European Free Trade Association Free Trade Agreement (Canada & EFTA) – took effect in 2009
- Comprehensive Economic and Trade Agreement (Canada & EU) – substantial parts are provisionally applied since September 2017
- Free Trade Agreement between Mexico and the European Union (Mexico & EU) – took effect in 2000
- European Economic Area (most of EU & EFTA) – took effect in 1994
- Various bilateral free trade agreements of Switzerland

== EU-US trade ==
- Transatlantic Economic Council

== See also ==
- Free trade areas in Europe
- List of bilateral free trade agreements
