= Kathy Kemper =

American tennis player, executive, writer, and philanthropist

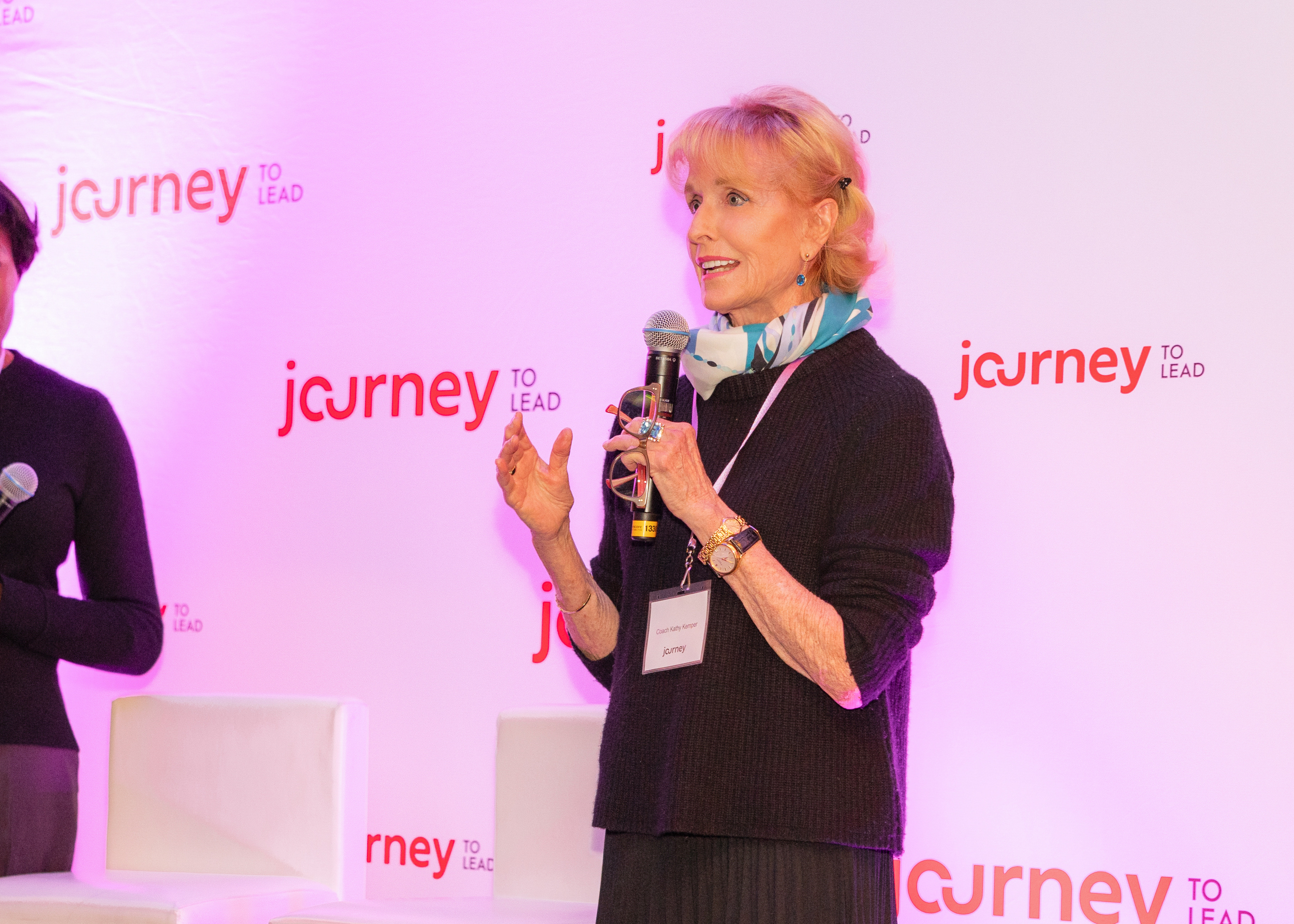
- Kemper in 2025
- Born: July 17, 1953 (age 72); Northfield, Illinois, U.S.
- Other names: Coach
- Occupations: Executive, Tennis Coach, Writer, Philanthropist
- Organization: Institute for Education
- Spouse: James I. Valentine (m. 1990; died 2021)
- Children: Kelsey Kemper Valentine, Christina Kemper Valentine
- Parent(s): James Kemper, Joan Sealy

Kathy "Coach" Kemper (born July 17, 1953) is an American executive, tennis coach, writer, and philanthropist. Kemper rose to prominence in the tennis scene, eventually heading the women's tennis team at Georgetown University, where she earned the nickname "Coach". Kemper has spent more than 30 years coaching movie stars, professional athletes, monarchs, Supreme Court Justices, Ambassadors, members of Congress, intelligence agency directors, and individuals from seven White House administrations.

In 1992, Kemper founded the Institute For Education (IFE), a nonprofit organization based in Washington, D.C. that recognizes and promotes leadership, civility, and the search for common ground locally, nationally, and in the world community. The institute has come to host many famous guests, including Hillary Rodham Clinton, Ruth Bader Ginsburg, and Arianna Huffington.

Kemper is also an op-ed writer and columnist, and has a regular Huffington Post blog. Her work has been featured in The Globalist, The Hill, USA Today, Roll Call, The Washington Examiner, Newsday, Bangkok Post and The Washington Diplomat.

In 2024, Kemper released a tennis dress in collaboration with the fashion brand Tuckernuck.

In 2025, Kemper was inducted into the Confrérie des Chevaliers du Tastevin.

== Background ==
Kathy Kemper was born in Northfield, Illinois to Joan Sealy and James Kemper. She attended Marillac High School, where she captained the basketball team and graduated in 1971. Soon after, Kemper enrolled in Marymount College near Boca Raton, Florida on a tennis scholarship. During her time there, she was denied entry into a collegiate tennis tournament due to her athletic scholarship. Kemper's coach, Peachy Kellmeyer, among others, challenged the Association for Intercollegiate Athletics for Women on their anti-scholarship policy. The resulting court case helped bring about essential reform in women's athletics in the form of Title IX legislation.

Kemper was the head women's tennis coach at Georgetown University from 1978 to 1990, coaching Georgetown's No.1 player to a four-year undefeated match play streak and to the Big East and NCAA National Women's Division II title in 1983.

During her time as Georgetown's head women's tennis coach, Kemper helped launch Women at the Net: a celebrity benefit tournament where participants would play against Georgetown's current team. In 1986 alone, the New York Times reported that seven U.S. senators, the Secretary of the Treasury, four Ambassadors, and the Republican National Chairman would be in attendance.

After Georgetown, Kemper began to focus on private tennis lessons, entrepreneurship, and the development of her nonprofit, the Institute for Education. For this work, Kemper has been honored by the Swedish, Japanese, and Chinese governments.

Kemper is a board member and Champion of Journey to Lead, an organization for scouting women in leadership positions.

In 2022, Kemper was one of the first two women inducted as a “Friend” of the selective Gridiron Club.

In 2025, the Washington Post Intelligence Global Security Council announced its founding membership, with Kemper among those named.

Kemper is currently an AI Ambassador for AIGrrls, a trustee emeritus for Learn Serve International, and an investor focusing on biotech and healthcare with Family Futures LLC.

== Institute For Education ==
Kathy Kemper founded the nonprofit Institute for Education (IFE) in 1992 when her husband, James Valentine, suggested she organize a breakfast to introduce her political contacts with his business colleagues. In her position as CEO, Kemper helped IFE establish its reputation for diplomacy after facilitating what was the first-ever regional summit between the Governors of Maryland, Virginia and the Mayor of DC (Bob Ehrlich, Mark Warner, and Anthony A. Williams respectively.) The Institute regularly holds "INFO Roundtables," which have been hosted by over 280 speakers, including a vice president, various Supreme Court justices, governors, Cabinet secretaries, CIA and FBI directors, Nobel laureates, and professional athletes.

Since 2012, the Institute for Education has shown a greater focus on the power of data, innovation, and soft diplomacy, often praising collaboration between the federal government and private sector, such as the Presidential Innovation Fellow (PIF) program. The founders of the PIF program are former U.S. Chief Technology Officer Todd Park and former White House Office of Science and Technology Policy Senior Advisor for Innovation, John Paul Farmer, both of whom are part of IFE leadership.

In 2015, IFE partnered with USC's Viterbi School of Engineering to offer a free coding summer camp for underrepresented populations in grades K-12 around the Los Angeles area. Since its inception, the camp has worked with over 6,500 children. In 2016, the Institute for Education celebrated its 25th season anniversary.

In 2019, Kemper was recognized by Washington Life as one of their "Tech 25", an annual award spotlighting DC's 25 top technological innovators.

In 2021, IFE added a new program, "The Future of AI", founded by IFE Steward R. David Edelman with IFE Diplomatic Steward of Artificial Intelligence, Stavros Lambrinidis. As of 2026, IFE hosted nine roundtables exploring the future of AI across industries.

In 2022, IFE added another new program, "Blockchain of Impact" with IFE Diplomatic Steward of Blockchain, Ambassador Nicole Bintner-Bakshian of the Grand Duchy of Luxembourg.

== Personal life ==
Kemper married James Healy in the mid-seventies after the two met at Princeton University. Later, they moved to Washington, DC and eventually separated. In 1990, Kathy Kemper married James Valentine, gaining a son, Travis E. Valentine. The couple had their first daughter, Kelsey Kemper Valentine, in 1991. Their second daughter, Christina Kemper Valentine, was born in 1993. In 2021, Kemper's husband, James Valentine, died of prostate cancer.
