= Hilde Hardeman =

European civil servant and Belgian Slavonist

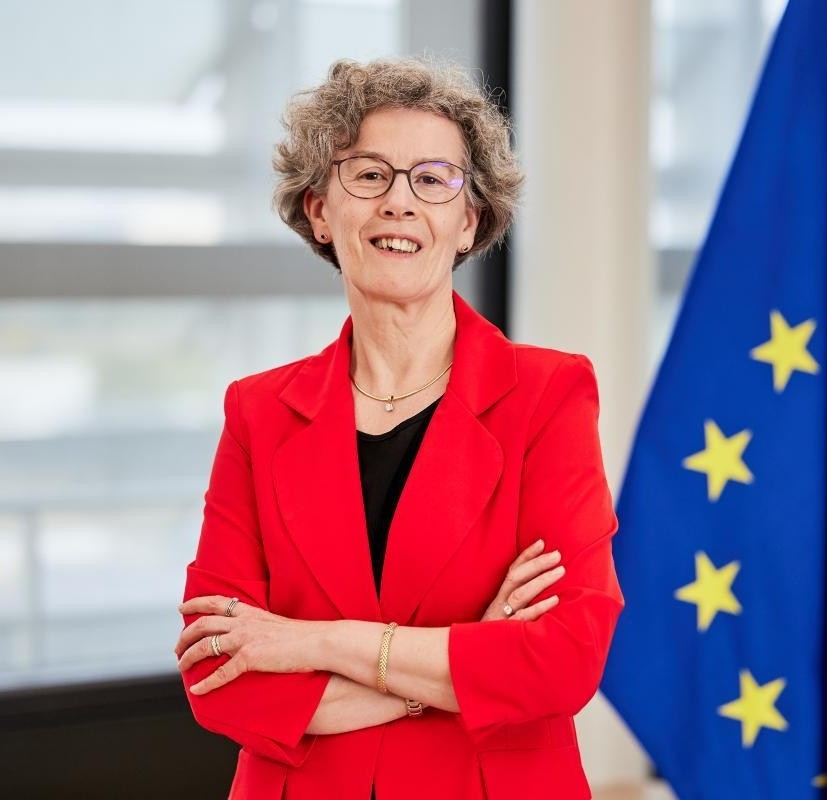
- Official portrait, 2024

Director-General of the Office of Publications of the European Union
- Incumbent
- Assumed office 1 December 2021
- Preceded by: Rudolf Strohmeier

Director of the Service for Foreign Policy Instruments
- In office May 2017 – November 2021
- Commission: Juncker; Von der Leyen I
- Preceded by: Tung-Lai Margue
- Succeeded by: Peter Wagner
Previous positions
2014–2017	Deputy Head of Cabinet of Vice-President Katainen
2011–2014	Head of the President's Briefings Unit (Secretariat-General)
2008–2010	Head of the Unit for Relations with Russia and Northern Dimension Policy (DG RELEX)
2005–2008	Head of the Unit for Relations with Ukraine, Moldova and Belarus (DG RELEX)

Personal details
- Citizenship: Belgium
- Education: Stanford University; EHESS; KU Leuven
- Profession: European civil servant

Hilde Hardeman is a European civil servant of Belgian nationality who has served as Director-General of the Publications Office (PO) of the European Union (EU) since December 2021. Hardeman previously served as Director of the Service for Foreign Policy Instruments (FPI) from 2017 to 2021, and as Deputy Head of Cabinet to the Vice-President of the European Commission for Jobs, Growth, Investment and Competitiveness, Jyrki Katainen, from 2014 to 2017.

== Life ==
Hilde Hardeman is a Slavonist by training, having been awarded a PhD in Slavic Philology and History, with the honours of summa cum laude, from KU Leuven. She undertook her graduate studies and doctoral research across a number of institutions, namely Stanford University in California, the École des hautes études en sciences sociales in Paris, the Institute for the History of the USSR - part of the Academy of Sciences of the Soviet Union - in Moscow, as well as the International Institute of Social History in Amsterdam.

Following the obtention of her doctoral degree, she remained at KU Leuven, affiliated to the Leuven Institute for Central and East European Studies, as a post-doctoral scholar on the legal protection of minorities in Central and Eastern Europe. During this period, Hardeman also undertook consultancy work on issues concerning her region of specialisation for, inter alia, the European Parliament, the King Baudouin Foundation and the Centre for European Policy Studies.

In 1998, Hilde Hardeman joined the European Commission as a desk officer for Ukraine within DG IA ('External Relations: Europe and the new independent States, common foreign and security policy and external mission'). From 2000 to 2003, Hardeman was a pre-accession coordinator for DG ELARG in the years prior to the 2004 EU enlargement. Joining DG RELEX (now the EEAS) in 2004, she continued to focus on the region, working on relations with Ukraine, Moldova, Belarus and, later, Russia and the Northern Dimension. In these functions, she played a key role in the initial negotiations on the EU-Ukraine Association Agreement and on setting up EUBAM.

In 2011, Hardeman joined the Secretariat-General as Head of the Briefings Unit for the President of the European Commission, José Manuel Barroso. She served as the Deputy Head of Cabinet of Vice-President Jyrki Katainen from 2014 to 2021, before becoming Director of the Service for Foreign Policy Instruments from 2017 to 2021 and, subsequently, Director-General of the Publication Office from 2021 onwards. In this roles, Hardeman has taken a stronger lead on external representation of the Commission, including at multilateral gatherings such as the Paris Peace Forum.

Leading the EU's Publication Office, Hardeman has contributed to the modernisation of the Official Journal of the European Union and has taken an active role in support of Ukraine, printing schoolbooks for Ukrainian children in partnership with the Ukrainian authorities and under the Erasmus+ programme.

Hilde Hardeman has been a Visiting Professor at the College of Europe, where she taught on the history of Russia and Eastern Europe. Alongside her native Dutch, she also speaks English, French, German, Italian and Russian.

Hardeman is from the region of Ypres, which was strongly impacted by the First World War and has shaped her vision of the European Union as a peace project. She plays the organ and the piano, and sings in a choir.
