= João Vale de Almeida =

Portuguese ambassador (born 1957)

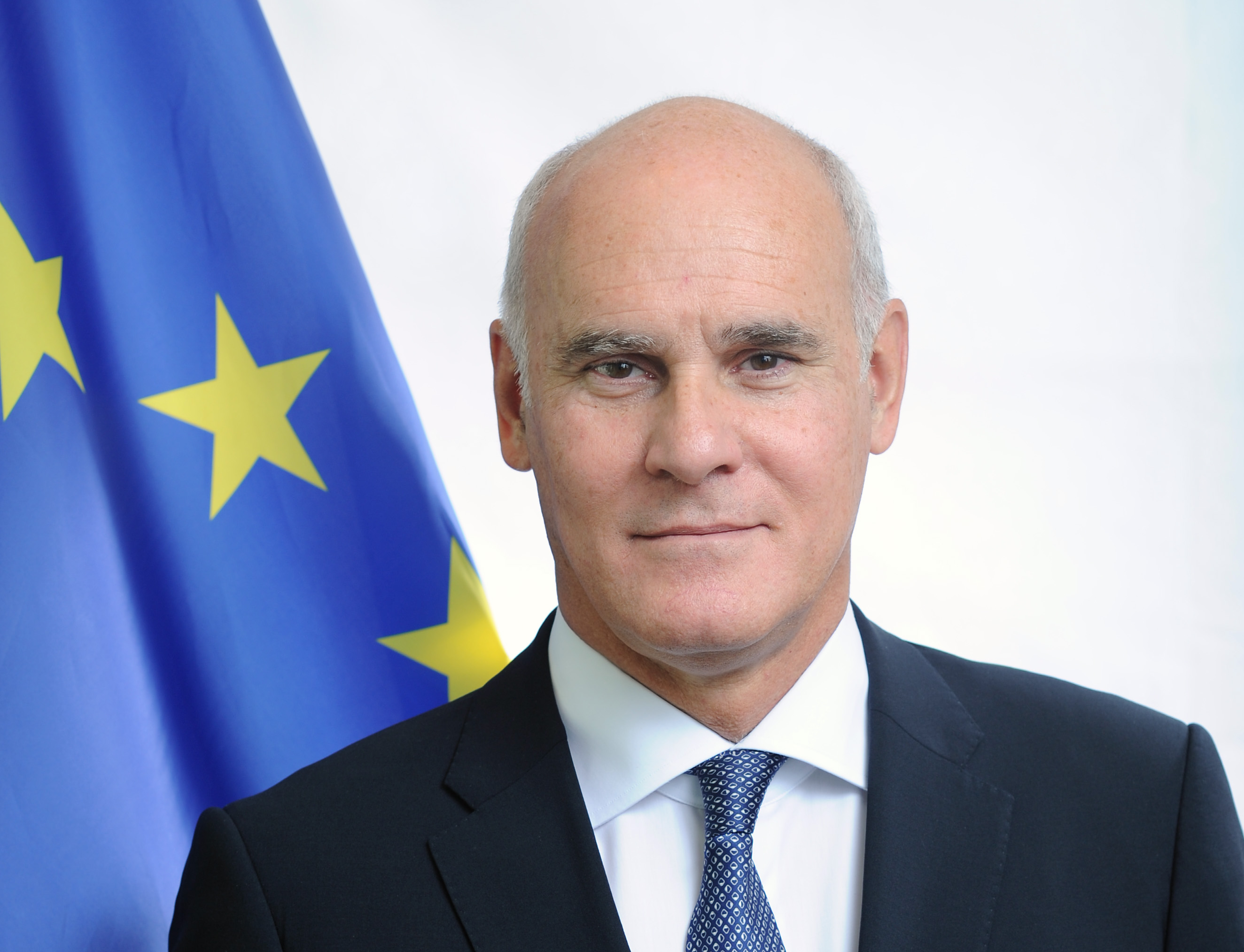

Ambassador of the European Union to the United Kingdom
- In office 1 February 2020 – 17 February 2022
- President: Ursula von der Leyen
- Preceded by: Office Established
- Succeeded by: Pedro Serrano

Ambassador of the European Union to the United Nations
- In office 16 October 2015 – 2019
- President: Jean-Claude Juncker
- Preceded by: Thomas Mayr-Harting

Ambassador of the European Union to the United States
- In office 10 August 2010 – 31 October 2014
- President: José Manuel Barroso
- Preceded by: John Bruton
- Succeeded by: David O'Sullivan

Personal details
- Born: João Vale de Almeida; 29 January 1957 (age 69) Lisbon, Portugal
- Education: University of Lisbon
- Website: Official website

João Vale de Almeida (born 29 January 1957 in Lisbon) is a former senior Portuguese diplomat.

Vale de Almeida was Ambassador of the European Union to the United Nations from 2015 to 2019 and Ambassador of the European Union to the United States from 2010 to 2014. He was appointed "the first head of the future EU delegation to the United Kingdom of Great Britain and Northern Ireland" on 1 February 2020. He served until 17 February 2022.

== Biography ==
Vale de Almeida read history at the University of Lisbon before pursuing further studies in journalism and management in France, Japan, the United Kingdom and the United States. After working as a journalist for seven years, in 1982 he joined the European Commission delegation in Lisbon.

During his time in the Commission he worked under presidents Jacques Delors, Jacques Santer, Romano Prodi and José Manuel Barroso. Under Santer, in 1995, he became deputy chief spokesman for the EC. In 1997 he was promoted Director for Information, Communication, Culture and Audiovisual.

When EC President Romano Prodi took office in 1999, Vale de Almeida was a member of his transition team before being nominated as director for Education and Culture.

Between 2004 and 2009, Vale de Almeida was the Head of Cabinet (Chief of staff and principal adviser) for EC President José Manuel Barroso. He accompanied Barroso in all European Council meetings and ensured coordination with the private offices of Heads of State and Government in all 28 Member States of the EU. He was also the President's Personal Representative for the negotiations on the Treaty of Lisbon and acted as his personal representative (sherpa) for G8 and G20 summits.

From November 2009 until July 2010 he served as Director-General for External Relations of the European Commission.

Vale de Almeida then served as the first Ambassador of the European Union to the United States of America, from 2010 to 2014, after the Treaty of Lisbon increased the delegation's powers to speak for the whole of the EU (previously, they represented only the commission). In Washington, he actively engaged in strengthening EU/U.S. relations and was critical to the launching of negotiations of the Transatlantic Trade and Investment Partnership agreement (TTIP).

From 2015 to 2019, Vale de Almeida was the European Union Ambassador to the United Nations.

On 1 February 2020, Vale de Almeida was appointed the European Union's Ambassador to the UK and was recognised by the UK as an Ambassador as of 5 May 2021. He continued this role until 17 February 2022.

Vale de Almeida retired on 31 January 2023.

== Honours and decorations ==
- Grand Cross of the Order of Prince Henry
- Cross of Merit, Order pro Merito Melitensi.

== See also ==
- European Union and the United Nations
- EU Delegation to the UK
