= EPLO =

EPLO may refer to:

- Emergency Preparedness Liaison Officers, personnel deployed by Air Forces Northern National Security Emergency Preparedness Directorate, Florida, US
- Ethiopian People's Liberation Organization, original name of the Ethiopian People's Revolutionary Party
- European Parliament Liaison Office with the US Congress
- European Peacebuilding Liaison Office, an independent civil society platform of European NGOs
- European Public Law Organization, successor to the European Public Law Center, based in Greece
