= R. David Edelman =

American academic and policymaker (born 1985)

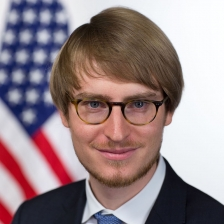

Special Assistant to the President for Economic and Technology Policy, National Economic Council
- In office October 1, 2013 – January 19, 2017
- President: Barack Obama

Personal details
- Born: Minneapolis, Minnesota, U.S.
- Party: Democratic
- Education: Yale University (BA); University of Oxford (MPhil, DPhil)
- Occupation: Director, Project on Technology, the Economy, & National Security at the Massachusetts Institute of Technology; President, Institute For Education

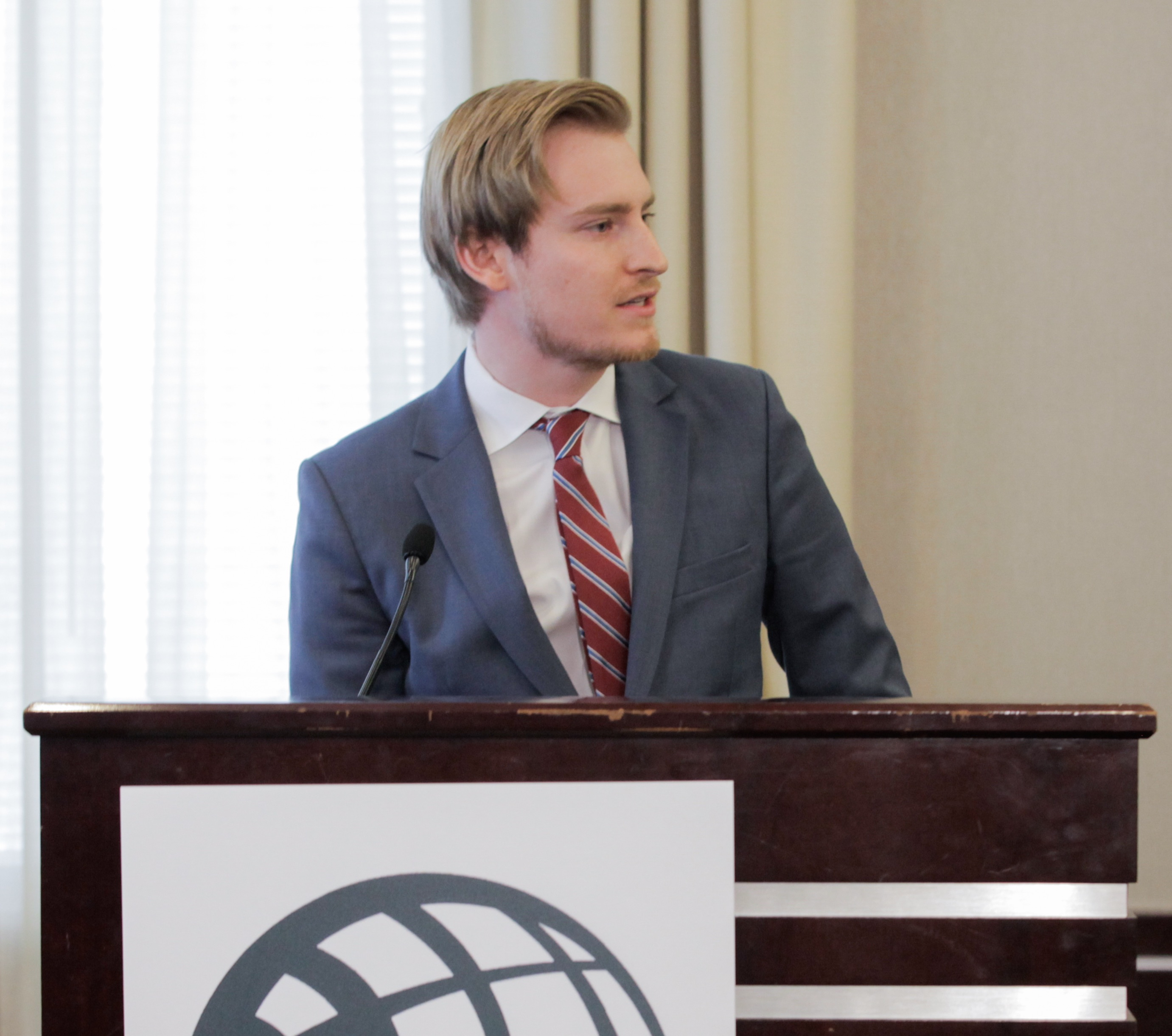
Edelman speaking at a cybersecurity conference in 2016

R. David Edelman is an American policymaker, author and academic who currently directs the Project on Technology, the Economy, and National Security (TENS) at the Massachusetts Institute of Technology. Previously, he served as Special Assistant to President Barack Obama on issues of the digital economy and national security. In that role, he led policy development around technology, artificial intelligence and related issues for the National Economic Council. He also served in the Office of Science & Technology Policy, and as the first Director for International Cyber Policy on the National Security Council.

== Early life and education ==
R. David Edelman was born in Minneapolis, Minnesota, later moving with his family to California, where he attended the Branson School. His parents, Steve and Sharon Edelman, are television hosts and producers.

Edelman received a Bachelor of Arts degree from Yale University. While there, he served on the Yale College Council, co-directed the Yale Ex!t Players improvisational comedy group , and founded the Yale-in-Washington program. He went on to earn his M.Phil and D.Phil in International Relations from Oxford University as a Clarendon Scholar. His dissertation, entitled “Cyberattacks in International Relations,” examined which forces might restrain state use of computer network attacks.

== Career ==
=== State Department ===
After leaving Oxford, Edelman returned to the U.S. to accept a role in the State Department as a Foreign Affairs Analyst for Northeast Asia. He later moved to the State Department’s Office of Cyber Affairs, where his focus shifted to American diplomacy around internet issues, and the international legal aspects of cyberspace. In that role, he became the United States’ primary negotiator at the United Nations for internet matters.

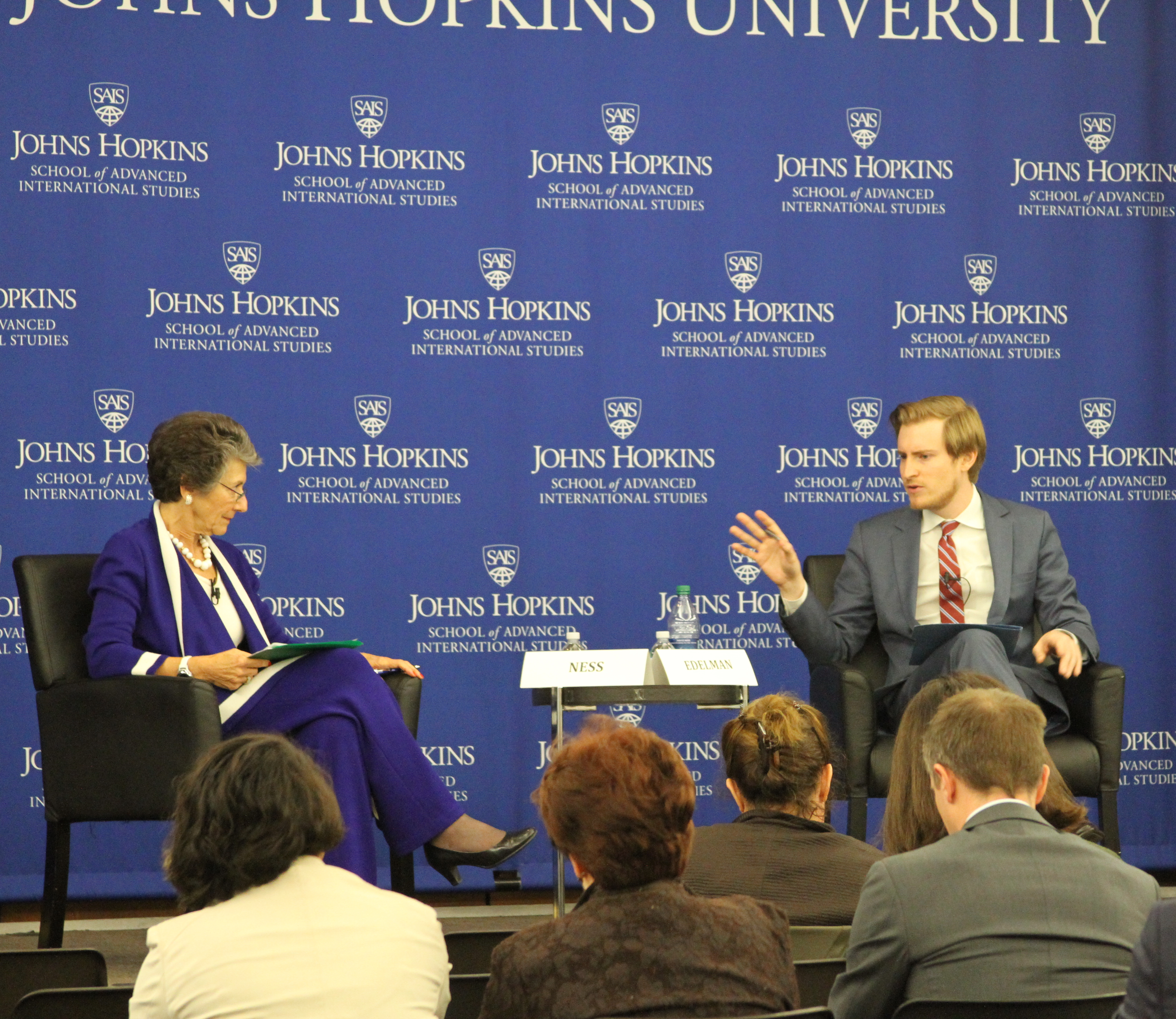
Edelman speaks at the Johns Hopkins School of Advanced International Studies

=== White House ===
In December, 2010 Edelman joined President Obama’s National Security Council staff as the first Director for International Cyber Policy, where he was called “chief cyber diplomat” for his work in the space. At that time, he was the youngest-ever Director appointed to the NSC.

On the NSC, Edelman was the primary author of the United States International Strategy for Cyberspace, and oversaw the 2013 addition of cybersecurity issues to the topics discussed on the Moscow-Washington hotline – colloquially, the “red phone”. He also coordinated the addition of cyber issues to the US-India dialogue in 2011, following nearly a decade of silence on the subject between those nations.

In 2012 Edelman became Senior Advisor for Internet, Innovation, and Privacy at the White House’s Office of Science & Technology Policy. There, he pursued several initiatives, including the creation of President Obama’s ConnectED program to provide K-12 classrooms with $10 billion in technology upgrades through public-private partnership. He also led the White House task force on High-Tech Patent Issues; the Administration’s effort to lift restrictions on cellphone unlocking; and the 2013 White House report, “Big Data: Seizing Opportunities, Preserving Values”.

In 2014 he was promoted to Special Assistant to the President for Economic & Technology Policy. In that role he managed the United States National Economic Council team responsible for a range of issues including innovation and technology trade, competition and antitrust, broadband/telecom, consumer cybersecurity, data privacy, and intellectual property. He was involved in the Administration’s policies on autonomous/connected vehicles; the EU-US Privacy Shield trade agreement; and 5G spectrum policy.

=== Academic career ===
In March 2017, Edelman joined the Massachusetts Institute of Technology's Internet Policy Research Initiative to direct its Project on Technology, the Economy, and National Security (TENS). At MIT, he holds appointments at the Computer Science & Artificial Intelligence Lab (CSAIL) and Center for International Studies (CIS), researching the governance of artificial intelligence, the geopolitics of technology, and the national security dimensions of computing.

In 2024, Oxford University Press published his book, Rethinking Cyber Warfare: The International Relations of Digital Disruption.

=== Nonprofit leadership ===
In February 2017, Edelman was appointed to the Board of Trustees of the Newseum, now the Freedom Forum. In 2024 he was named President of the Washington, D.C.–based Institute For Education, co-chairing its Future of AI Roundtables with EU Ambassadors Stavros Lambrinidis and Jovita Neliupšienė.
