= David O'Sullivan (civil servant) =

Irish diplomat for the EU

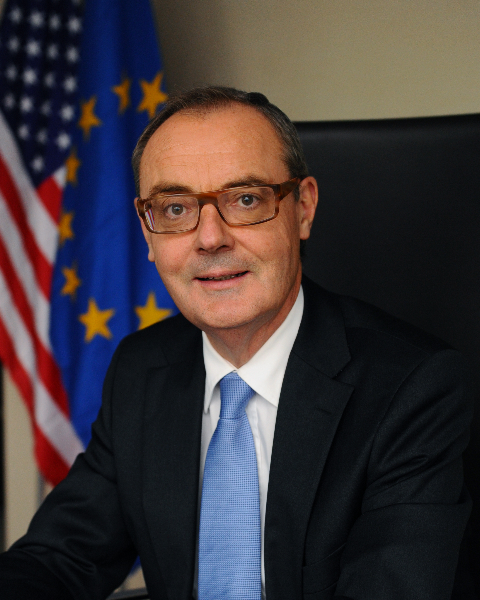

Ambassador of the European Union to the United States
- In office 1 November 2014 – 4 March 2019
- President: Jean-Claude Juncker
- Preceded by: João Vale de Almeida
- Succeeded by: Stavros Lambrinidis

Chief Operating Officer of the EEAS
- In office 1 December 2010 – 31 October 2014
- Preceded by: New office
- Succeeded by: Helga Schmid

Director-General of DG RELEX
- In office 28 October 2010 – 1 December 2010
- President: José Manuel Barroso
- Preceded by: João Vale de Almeida
- Succeeded by: Office abolished

Director-General of DG Trade
- In office 10 November 2005 – 28 October 2010
- President: José Manuel Barroso
- Preceded by: Peter Carl
- Succeeded by: Jean-Luc Demarty

Secretary General of the European Commission
- In office 1 June 2000 – 10 November 2005
- President: Romano Prodi; José Manuel Barroso
- Preceded by: Carlo Trojan
- Succeeded by: Catherine Day

EU Sanctions Envoy
- Incumbent
- Assumed office January 2023
- Preceded by: New office

Personal details
- Born: 1 March 1953 (age 73) Dublin, Ireland
- Party: Independent
- Children: 2
- Education: St Mary's College, Dublin
- Alma mater: Trinity College Dublin; College of Europe

David O'Sullivan (born 1 March 1953) is an Irish civil servant and the International Special Envoy for the Implementation of EU Sanctions since January 2023.

He was previously a European civil servant served as Ambassador of the European Union to the United States from 2014 to 2019, Chief Operating Officer of the EEAS from 2010 to 2014, Director-General of DG RELEX from October 2010 to December 2010, Director-General of DG Trade from 2005 to 2010, Secretary General of the European Commission from 2000 to 2005.

O'Sullivan has held a number of high level positions including Chief of Staff to President Romano Prodi and Secretary-General of the European Commission between June 2000 and November 2005. From 2005 to 2010, he was Director General for Trade. In 2010, he was appointed as Director General for External Relations, with the responsibility of setting up the EEAS and was appointed the Chief Operating Officer on 1 January 2011. He was previously Director General of the Institute of International and European Affairs (IIEA).

== Early and personal life ==
O'Sullivan was born in Dublin in 1953. He is married with two children. O'Sullivan speaks English, French, Spanish, German, Irish and Japanese. His father, Lieut. General Gerald (Gerry) O’Sullivan was formerly Chief of staff of the Irish Defence Forces. O'Sullivan lived in California for a time during his childhood.

O'Sullivan attended St. Mary's College C.S.Sp., Rathmines and studied Economics and Sociology at Trinity College Dublin. He graduated in 1975, and then he proceeded to study at the College of Europe in Bruges, Belgium, a year later, where he earned a postgraduate Diploma of Advanced European Studies. He then worked at the Irish Department of Foreign Affairs until 1979, when he entered the European Commission. While at Trinity, he was Auditor and debating Gold medalist of the College Historical Society and winner of the Irish Times debating competition.

== European Commission ==
In the Commission, O'Sullivan served as;

- Official in the Directorate General for External Relations. (1979)
- First Secretary in the Delegation of the Commission in Japan. (1981)
- Member of Commissioner Sutherland's cabinet with specific responsibility for social affairs and relations with the European Parliament.(1985)
- Head of Unit in the Task Force for Education, Youth and Training. (1989)
- Member of Commissioner Flynn's cabinet with specific responsibility for Social Dialogue and Labour Law.(1993)
- Deputy head in the cabinet of Commissioner Flynn. (1994)
- Directorate General for Employment – Director for policy and Coordination of the European Social Fund.(1996)
- Directorate General for Employment – Director for the management of resources.(1998)
- Director General for Education and Culture.(1999)

=== Prodi Commission and Director General for Trade ===
At the start of the Prodi Commission he was head of the President's Cabinet in 1999 and appointed Secretary-General a year later (in 2000), taking over from Carlo Trojan.

In 2005, he was appointed Director General for Trade where he acted as Chief Negotiator for the Doha Development Round. O'Sullivan also contributed to the launching of numerous bilateral trade negotiations and the conclusion of the Free Trade Agreement with South Korea (FTA); he supervised trade defence instruments and led regular trade dialogues with the European Union's major trade partners.

In November 2010, he was made Director-General of the Directorate-General for External Relations with the specific task of preparing for the launch of the new European External Action Service.

== EEAS ==
O'Sullivan became Chief Operating Officer of the European External Action Service (EEAS), the diplomatic service of the European Union, when it came into existence on 1 January 2011. In this capacity, he contributed to the setting up of the EEAS. O'Sullivan also had lead responsibilities within the EEAS for relations with Asia (including the Strategic Partnerships with China, India, Japan and South Korea), relations with the rest of Europe (including the Eastern Neighbourhood, the Balkans, Russia and Switzerland) and relations with Africa.

O'Sullivan was appointed to the post of Ambassador of the European Union to the United States, taking up office in Washington, D.C., on 1 November 2014. He presented his credentials to President Barack Obama at a White House ceremony on 18 November 2014.

== IIEA ==
He was previously the Director General of the Institute of International and European Affairs (IIEA)

== Honours and awards ==
He is a Vice-President of the College Historical Society (Trinity College, Dublin).

In 1999, he was named European of the Year by the European Movement Ireland.

He was awarded with an Honorary Doctorate from the Dublin Institute of Technology in 2005. In April 2013, O'Sullivan was awarded as Alumnus of the Year by the College of Europe.

He was awarded the EU Transatlantic Business Award by the American Chamber of Commerce in June 2014.

He was awarded an Honorary Doctorate from Trinity College Dublin in December 2014.

He was awarded with the Legion d'Honneur (France, 2019), the Order of Leopold (Belgium, 2019) and the Order of Merit (Ukraine, 2026)

Political offices
Preceded by Carlo Trojan	Secretary General of the European Commission; 2000–2005	Succeeded by Catherine Day
