= Günter Burghardt =

German civil servant

Günter Burghardt, a senior European civil servant and former European Union ambassador to the United States, is a European lawyer and academic.

== Career ==
Born on 27 April 1941 in Kroßwitz, Provinz Posen, now Krosnievice/Poznan, Burghardt studied law in Hamburg and Strasbourg. He passed his two State exams in Hamburg (Prädikat "Gut") in 1966 and 1970. He became "Lauréat de la Faculté de Droit de l'Université de Strasbourg" in 1963 and performed post-graduate studies at the City of London College in 1970. After earning a "Summa cum laude" PhD in European Community law (University of Hamburg, 1969), Burghardt joined the European Commission's legal service, where he worked from 1970 to 1972. He then moved to the Commission's External Relations Department as a desk officer for the United States, Canada and Australia under Commissioner Sir Christopher Soames. In 1978 he became the personal assistant of Sir Roy Denman, the Director-General for External Relations (1978–1980). Denman was later to serve as EU Ambassador to the U.S. (1982–1989).

From 1981 to 1984 Burghardt was deputy chief of staff to the EU’s Commissioner for Internal Market, Environment Protection, and Nuclear Safety and Innovation. From 1985 till 1993, as an aide to European Commission president Jacques Delors, he was deputy chief of staff and political director, participating in major achievements of the Delors presidency, such as the completion of the EU's internal market agenda, the negotiation of the Single European Act and the Maastricht and Amsterdam Treaties on European Union, the introduction of the Euro currency, managing German reunification within the European Union process, the accession of new EU member states and strengthening the partnership of the EU with the United States.

In 1987 Burghardt was also appointed as the European Commission's Political Director participating a.o. in the Balkan crisis and in 1993 he became the Director General for External Relations of the European Commission, a position he held from 1993 to 2000 under Commissioners Hans van den Broek (1993–1999) and Chris Patten (1999–2000). In this capacity Burghardt was responsible for the setting up of the Commission's External Services with some 130 diplomatic posts around the globe which in 2009 were transferred to today's European External Action Service (EEAS) under the Lisbon Treaty. In 1999 he was appointed European Union Ambassador and Head of Delegation to the United States, a position he left in November 2004.

After retirement in 2004, Burghardt combined a number of activities as legal and European policy adviser, and as an academic. He has been a special advisor to Olli Rehn, till 2010 the European Commissioner for Enlargement and European Neighbourhood Policy, responsible in particular for the political aspects of enlargement and related issues in the Balkans. From 2005 to 2012 he lectured as a guest professor at the College of Europe in Bruges and at the Law Faculty of Ghent University. In 2005 he joined the law firm Mayer Brown Europe-Brussels LLP in their Brussels and Washington, D.C. offices as a Senior Counsel specializing in regulatory matters, trade policy and antitrust.

Burghardt serves on the board of directors for several think tanks, including Friends of Europe, the Transatlantic Economic Council, the European Institute, the Itinera Institute, and the EU-Russia Centre. He is a member of the American Chamber of Commerce to the European Union and the German Economic Council. In 2011 he became vice-president of the Club of Rome EU Chapter.

== Articles ==
- (2008) "The EU's transatlantic relationship" in Alan Dashwood and Marc Maresceau (eds.), Law and Practice of EU External Relations: Salient Features of a Changing Landscape, Cambridge Univ. Press, pp. 376–397. ISBN 978-0521182553.
- (2014) "The Transatlantic Partnership - A Legal and Institutional Appraisal" in "The European Union in the World", Nijhoff Publishers, Leiden, Boston, pp461–476
- (2015) "The EU/US Transatlantic Relationship-the indispensable partnership" in European Yearbook of International Economic Law, Special Issue, Springer, pp193–226
- (1969) "Die Eigentumsordnung in den Mitgliedstaaten und der EWG-Vertrag", Universität Hamburg, Abhandlungen aus dem Seminar für Öffentliches Recht, Heft 57, 1969
- (2002) "Die Europäische Verfassungsentwicklung aus dem Blickwinkel der USA", Schriftenreihe des Walter Hallstein-Institut Forum Constitutionis Europae der Humboldt Universität Berlin, Band 5, 2002
- (1997) "Kommentar zu Titel V des Vertrages von Maastricht betr. die Gemeinsame Außen-und Sicherheitspolitik", Groeben/Thiesing/Ehlermann, Kommentar zum EU/EG Vertrag, Nomos 1997

Ribbon bar, Order of Merit (Germany), First Class

== Awards ==
Burghardt has received the German Federal Cross of Merit, First Class (Bundesverdienstkreuz 1. Klasse), the European Commission's Robert Schuman Medal, and Bavaria's Europe Medal.
