= Mike Memoli =

American TV journalist

- Born: New Jersey
- Education: Loyola College (BA)
- Occupation: Journalist
- Years active: 2004–present
- Employer: NBC News

Mike Memoli is an American journalist working at NBC News as a White House correspondent, based at the network's Washington bureau.

== Early life and education ==
Born and raised in New Jersey, Memoli graduated with a Bachelor of Arts degree in communication from Loyola College in Maryland in 2004.

== Career ==
He began his career in journalism in 2004 at the National Journal's The Hotline as a senior writer for 3 years and then served as an advisor at Institute For Education in International Media.

From 2007 to 2008, Memoli joined NBC News as an off-air campaign reporter in partnership with the National Journal and provided coverage of the 2008 United States presidential election.

He then joined RealClearPolitics in 2009, serving as a reporter covering politics nationally and White House events. He later joined the Tribune Media in 2010, becoming a reporter in the Tribune's Washington Bureau for 7 years.

Memoli rejoined NBC News in 2017, starting as a national political reporter in Washington, D.C.. He was then promoted to correspondent in 2019, reporting on national political developments before landing his current role with the network in 2021 as a White House correspondent.
