= Delegation of the European Union to the United States =

European Union delegation

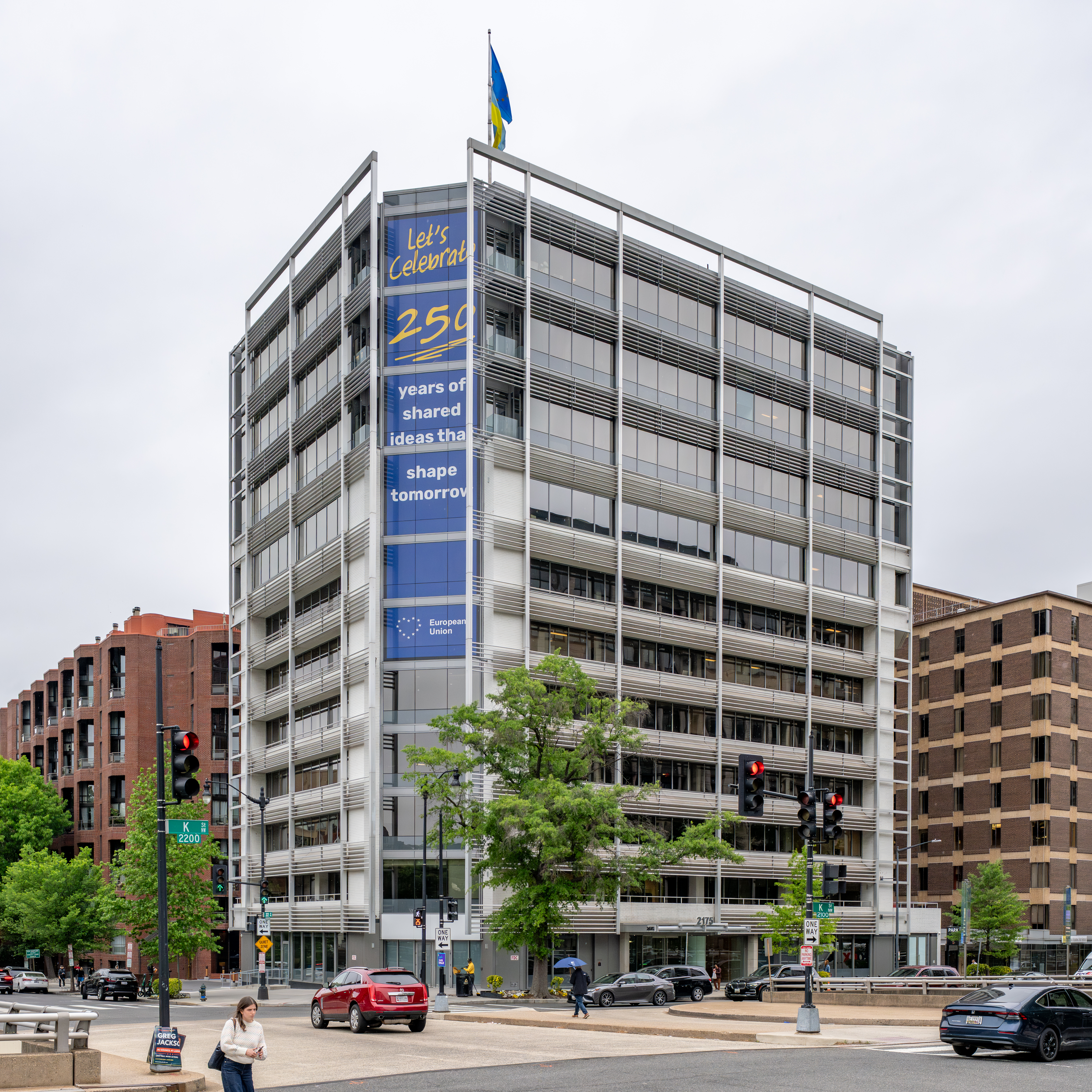
- (2026)
- Address: 2175 K Street, N.W. Washington, D.C.
- Coordinates: 38°54′9.86″N 77°02′55.09″W
- Ambassador: Jovita Neliupšienė (January 2024-Present)

The Delegation of the European Union to the United States represents the European Union in the United States, working in coordination with the diplomatic and consular missions of all 27 EU Member States. It is located at 2175 K Street, N.W., in the West End neighborhood of Washington, D.C.

The current Ambassador of the European Union to the United States is Jovita Neliupšienė, who started on January 1, 2024, and is the first woman to hold the position. From 2019-2023, the Ambassador of the EU Delegation was Stavros Lambrinidis.

== Role ==
The European Union's Delegation in Washington, D.C., represents and promotes the interests and values of the European Union in the United States. This includes presenting and explaining EU policies and actions to the different branches and levels of the U.S. Administration, Congress, and across the country, as well as promoting EU-U.S. cooperation in all fields. Staff members engage inside and outside of Washington with the American public, political actors, the media, academia, business, think tanks, and civil society to raise awareness on the importance of the transatlantic relationship and its unparalleled contribution to the prosperity and security of Europeans and Americans alike.

The Delegation represents the EU in matters where the EU Member States have agreed that their interests be represented collectively, for example, in areas of customs and trade. In contrast, the Embassy of each EU Member State represents the bilateral interests of that nation in its dealings with the U.S. government, and in areas that are not under specific EU jurisdiction. All consular affairs are dealt with by individual Member States.

== History ==
In 1952, the United States became the first non-member country to recognize the European Coal and Steel Community. Jean Monnet, one of the EU's founding fathers, reciprocated this recognition by choosing Washington, D.C, as the ECSC's first external presence.

Led by Leonard Tennyson, an American journalist and public relations official in the Marshall Plan administration, the two-room, two-person office was first located at 805 15th Street NW. After the launch of the European Economic Community (EEC) and European Atomic Energy Community (EAEC) in 1958, the ECSC Information Office changed its name to the European Communities Information Service.

In 1972, the European Communities Information Service received full diplomatic status when Congress approved legislation and U.S. President Richard Nixon signed it into law. The office was then known as the Delegation of the Commission of the European Communities to the United States. In 2009, the Treaty of Lisbon established the EU's diplomatic service, the European External Action Service (EEAS), and so the Delegation became the Delegation of the European Union to the United States.

Since 1964, the EU has also maintained an office in New York, which now serves as the EU Delegation to the United Nations. In September 2022, the EU opened an office in San Francisco, California, with a focus on digital and tech matters. The opening is a result of the 2021 EU-U.S. Summit shared commitment to strengthen transatlantic technological cooperation and is a core part of the Conclusions on Digital Diplomacy, adopted by the EU Foreign Affairs Council in July 2022.

=== Precedence ===
At diplomatic events, the EU ambassadorship previously followed national ambassadorships; i.e., it sat "on par with the African Union", which is also not a country. In 2016, the Obama administration promoted the EU precedence to country-level (but only the Europeans, and not any other non-nations). In 2018, the Department of State returned the EU ambassadorship to non-country level, "back alongside the African Union." Jan Ehler, from Germany, Chairman of the EU parliamentary Delegation for Relations with the United States, complained of the EU being relegated to "the bottom of the list." In March 2019, the Department of State restored the diplomatic status of the European Union back to the pre-2018 status reflecting the EU's status "as equivalent to that of a bilateral mission in the Diplomatic Corps Order of Precedence."

== Main Priorities ==
The EU-U.S. partnership has prospered for more than six decades, constructed on a foundation of shared common values, including a commitment to the rule of law, the democratic process, free enterprise, human rights, and alleviating poverty.

=== Peace and Stability ===
The EU and the United States share a global responsibility to promote common values, including democracy, peace, freedom, and the rule of law; support and protect human rights around the world; create conditions for harmonious economic development worldwide; strengthen the rules-based international system, and improve the economies of developing countries and those in transition. The United States is the EU’s foremost strategic partner in promoting peace and stability around the world.

=== Deep Economic Ties ===
The EU-U.S. economic partnership is the single-most important driver of global economic growth, trade, and prosperity. Taken together, the economies of both territories constitute close to one-third of world GDP in terms of purchasing power. The EU and United States are each other’s main trading partners and account for the largest bilateral trade relationship in the world.

=== Climate, Energy, and Connectivity ===
The EU and United States stand together for sustainable and trusted connections that work for people and the planet to tackle the most pressing global challenges, from climate change and protecting the environment to improving health security and boosting competitiveness and global supply chains. Through obligation to the Paris Agreement, open diplomatic channels, and a commitment to science, the EU and United States agree on the need for open, transparent, competitive, and sustainable solutions for a greener future.

== Staff ==
Jovita Neliupšienė became the Ambassador of the European Union to the United States on January 1, 2024. Before that, she was a Vice Minister of Foreign Affairs of Lithuania from September 2022, where she was responsible for the coordination of European Affairs, European bilateral and regional issues, as well as national sanctions coordinator.

In addition to acting as diplomatic liaison between the EU and the United States, the EU Ambassador acts as the official representative of EU interests, policies, and priorities with high-level interlocutors in the U.S. Administration and Congress, as well as U.S. state leaders and key stakeholders in business, academia, civil society, and the U.S. media. As of 2024, the Delegation has approximately 120 staff members, comprising one-third diplomats and two-thirds local hires.

Since 1 December 2024, the EU Delegation represents EU interests as determined by European Commission President Ursula von der Leyen, European Council President António Costa, and High Representative for Foreign Affairs and Security Policy/Vice-President Kaja Kallas. The European Parliament Liaison Office facilitates dialogue between the European Parliament, including President Roberta Mestola, and the U.S. Congress.

== Embassy Sections ==
Head/Deputy Head of Delegation
Serves as official representative of the EU to the United States

Political, Security & Development
The Political, Security and Development section follows the transatlantic agenda and monitors the work of Congress and the U.S. Administration on foreign, security, and development policy, counterterrorism, justice and home affairs, and human rights.

Trade & Agriculture
The Trade and Agriculture section monitors and analyses U.S. political, economic, and regulatory developments in the areas of trade policy, agriculture, industrial policy, and the digital economy.

Economic & Financial Affairs
The Economic and Financial Affairs section monitors and assesses U.S. macroeconomic and financial developments and policies, and liaises with U.S. authorities dealing with economic, financial, and monetary issues, as well as with relevant international financial institutions.

Press & Public Diplomacy
The Press and Public Diplomacy section enhances awareness of the EU and its policies in the United States. Through digital communications, the media, educational initiatives, cultural events, and outreach activities, the section is the Delegation’s first line of contact with the American public.

Global Issues and Innovation
The Global Issues and Innovation section monitors and analyses U.S. political, economic, and regulatory developments in the areas of environmental protection, climate change, energy, transportation, food safety, public health, consumer protection, space, research and innovation, development cooperation, and global connectivity.

Foreign Policy Instruments
The Foreign Policy Instruments section designs and implements actions and projects to advance European Union policy priorities in its relations with the United States.

San Francisco Office
The EU office in San Francisco reinforces the EU’s cooperation with the United States on digital diplomacy and strengthens the EU’s capacity to reach out to key stakeholders, including policy makers, the business community, and civil society in the digital technology sector in the Bay Area.

Administration
The Administration section provides support services to the Delegation staff, building, and residences through the authorized allocation of budgetary resources. It also liaises with authorities in Europe and the United States on protocol and administrative matters related to EU officials.

== Former Ambassadors ==
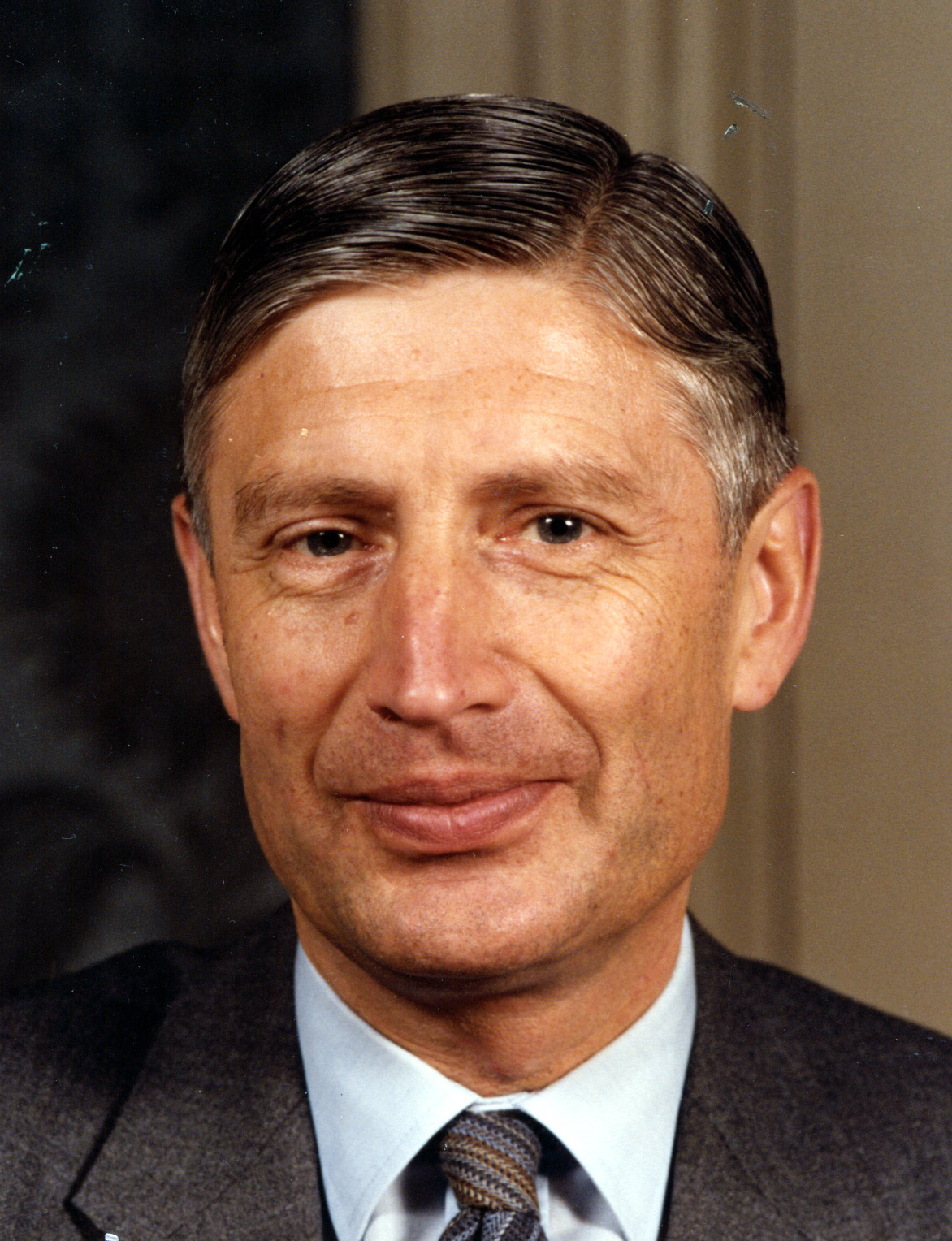
Dries van Agt, Ambassador of the European Union to the United States from 1 January 1989 until 1 April 1995.

Among the Delegation's former Ambassadors, three also served as their country's prime minister: Jens Otto Krag, Dries van Agt, and John Bruton, and one as their country’s foreign minister: Stavros Lambrinidis

- Stavros Lambrinidis – March 2019 - December 2023
- David O'Sullivan – November 2014 to March 2019
- João Vale de Almeida – February 2010 to November 2014
- Angelos Pangratis (acting) – October 2009 to February 2010
- John Bruton (former Irish Taoiseach) – November 2004 to October 2009
- Günter Burghardt – January 2000 to November 2004
- Hugo Paemen – 1995 to 1999
- Dries van Agt (former Prime Minister of the Netherlands) – 1989 to 1995
- Sir Roy Denman – 1982 to 1989
- Roland de Kergorlay – 1981 to 1982
- Fernand Spaak (son of Paul-Henri Spaak and first EC civil servant to the post) – 1977 to 1981
- Jens Otto Krag (former Prime Minister of Denmark) – 1974 to 1977
- Aldo Mario Mazio (first titled Ambassador and received diplomatic recognition) – 1971 to 1974

== Building ==
On September 29, 2010, EU High Representative for Foreign Affairs and Security Policy and Vice President of the European Commission Catherine Ashton inaugurated the current EU Delegation to the United States. The Delegation building was granted LEED Gold status by the U.S. Green Building Council.

== See also ==
- United States–European Union relations
- European Union Ambassador
- United States Mission to the European Union
- List of diplomatic missions of the European Union
- European External Action Service
- European Parliament Liaison Office with the US Congress
