= Peter M. Wagner =

European civil servant

Peter Wagner
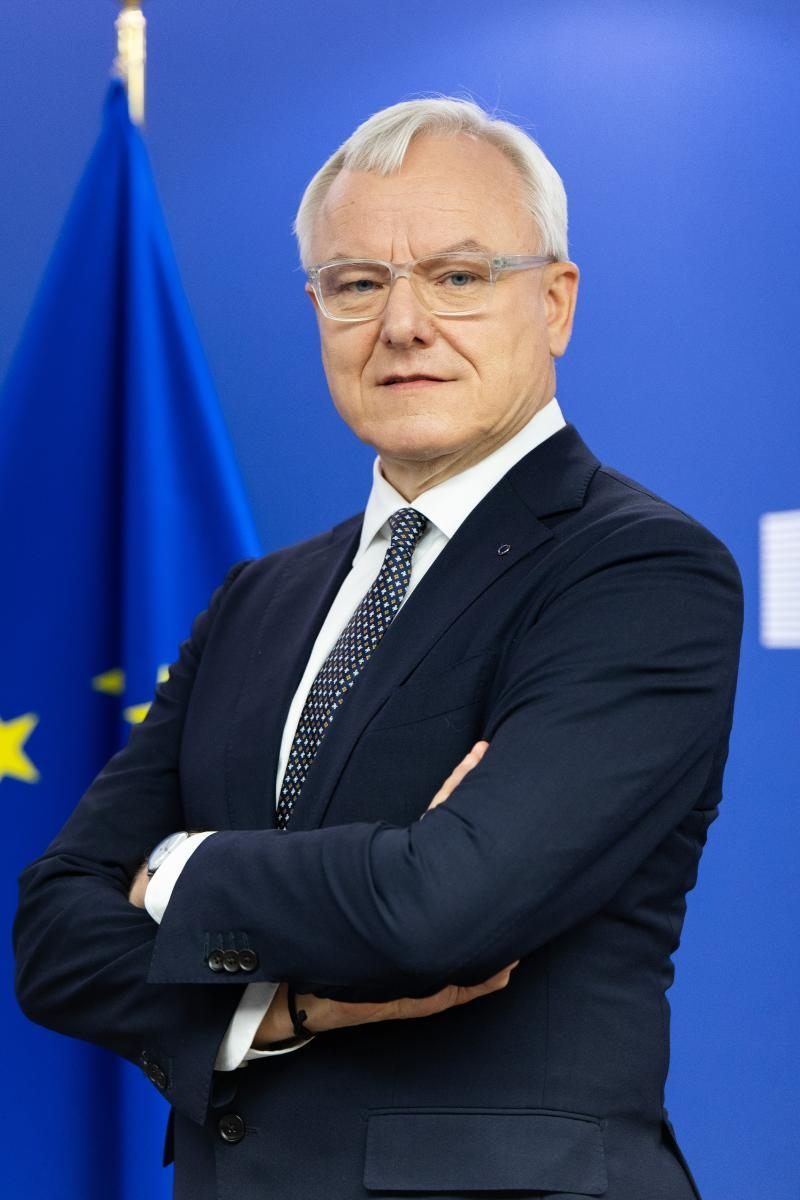
- Official portrait, 2024

Director of the Service for Foreign Policy Instruments
- Incumbent
- Assumed office July 2022
- Preceded by: Hilde Hardeman
- Commission: Von der Leyen I; Von der Leyen II

Personal details
- Citizenship: Germany
- Education: University of Freiburg (MA, PhD)
- Profession: European civil servant

Military service
- Allegiance: Germany
- Branch/service: Bundeswehr
- Years of service: 1985-1986

Peter M. Wagner is a European civil servant of German nationality who has served as Director of the Service for Foreign Policy Instruments (FPI) of the European Commission since July 2022.

== Education and early years ==
Peter M. Wagner completed his military service in 1985–1986, serving in the II. Korps of the German armed forces. In 1986, he became a student at the University of Freiburg, where he attended lectures on political science, history, psychology and economics, graduating with a Magister Artium in 1991. He also studied at the University of Vienna during the 1988–1989 academic year. In 1996, Wagner obtained his PhD from his home university in Freiburg.

From 1991 to 1993, Wagner worked as an editor for several regional newspaper in Germany. Whilst undertaking his doctoral studies, he was employed as a researcher at the Centre for Applied Policy Research (Centrum für Angewandte Politikforschung) affiliated to the Geschwister-Scholl-Institut in Munich. He subsequently has attended courses at the University of Oxford.

== Career ==
Peter M. Wagner joined the European Commission in 1999 as a desk officer for DG III (Industry), working on regulatory coordination and the internal market. In 2000, he joined the then DG ENTR (Enterprise and Industry; now GROW), first as a desk officer before becoming the assistant to the Director-General, Horst Reichenbach, in 2003.

Wagner remained, across various roles, in DG ENTR until 2011 whereupon he became an adviser to the Task Force for Greece. In 2015, he transferred to the Support Group for Ukraine at DG NEAR, quickly becoming the group's head, a position in which he would remain until 2020. That year, in the midst of the COVID-19 pandemic, he was appointed to the rank of Principal Adviser within the Secretariat-General (SG), heading the clearing house for medical equipment and coordinating the response to the pandemic.

Given his prior experience at DG NEAR, he contributed to the Ukraine files within the SG at an early point following the launch of the Russian full-scale invasion. In July 2022, he became Director of the Service for Foreign Policy Instruments, responsible for the financial and operational components of the Common Foreign and Security Policy and reporting directly in his functions to the High Representative & Commission Vice-president Kaja Kallas.

In his role, Peter Wagner has led the FPI response to the Russian war of aggression on Ukraine, including ensuring parts of the operational dimension of the supply of military equipment through the administration of the European Peace Facility, humanitarian mine action to enable the return of refugees from the de-occupied territories and the resumption of agricultural production, preserving access to education in conditions of conflict and contributing to territorial connectivity. Under Wagner's term in office, FPI has also serviced a Ukrainian-led centre which seeks to counter foreign information manipulation and interference and has closely collaborated with the International Criminal Court to enable the local prosecution teams to pursue the investigation of war crimes on the ground. FPI also focuses on nuclear safety, having worked to secure the Zaporizhzhya nuclear-power plant and other critical infrastructure, in partnership with the IAEA.

Alongside his native German, Wagner speaks fluent English and French.
