= European Parliament Liaison Office with the US Congress =

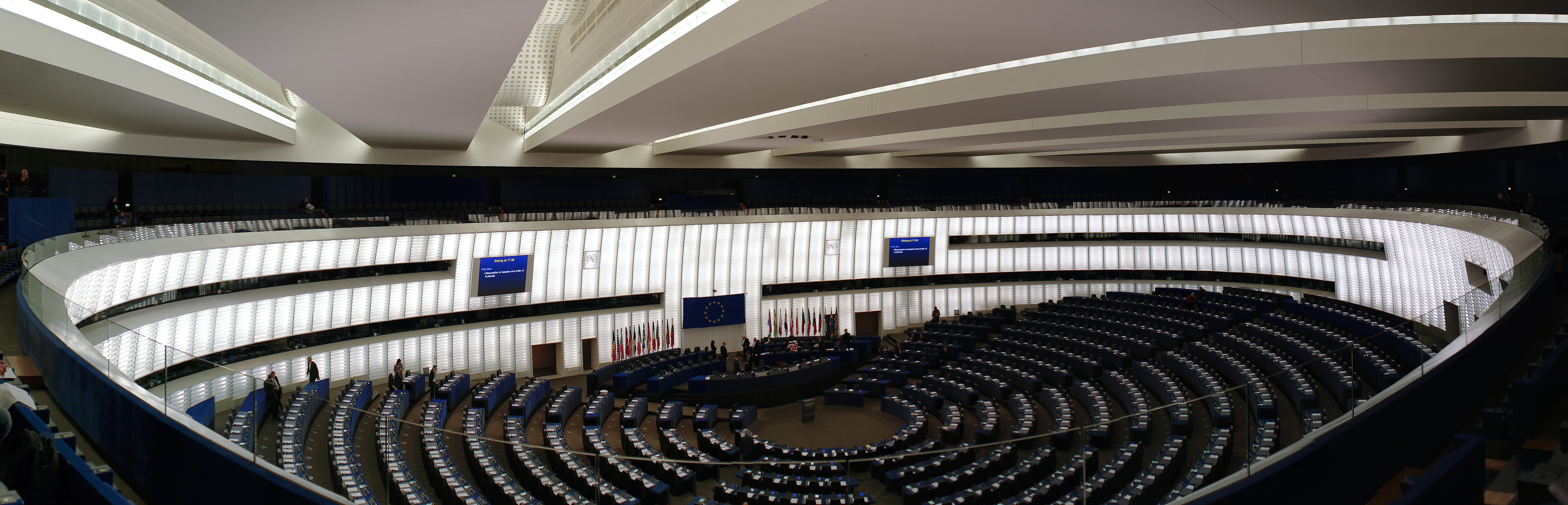
European Parliament, Strasbourg, France

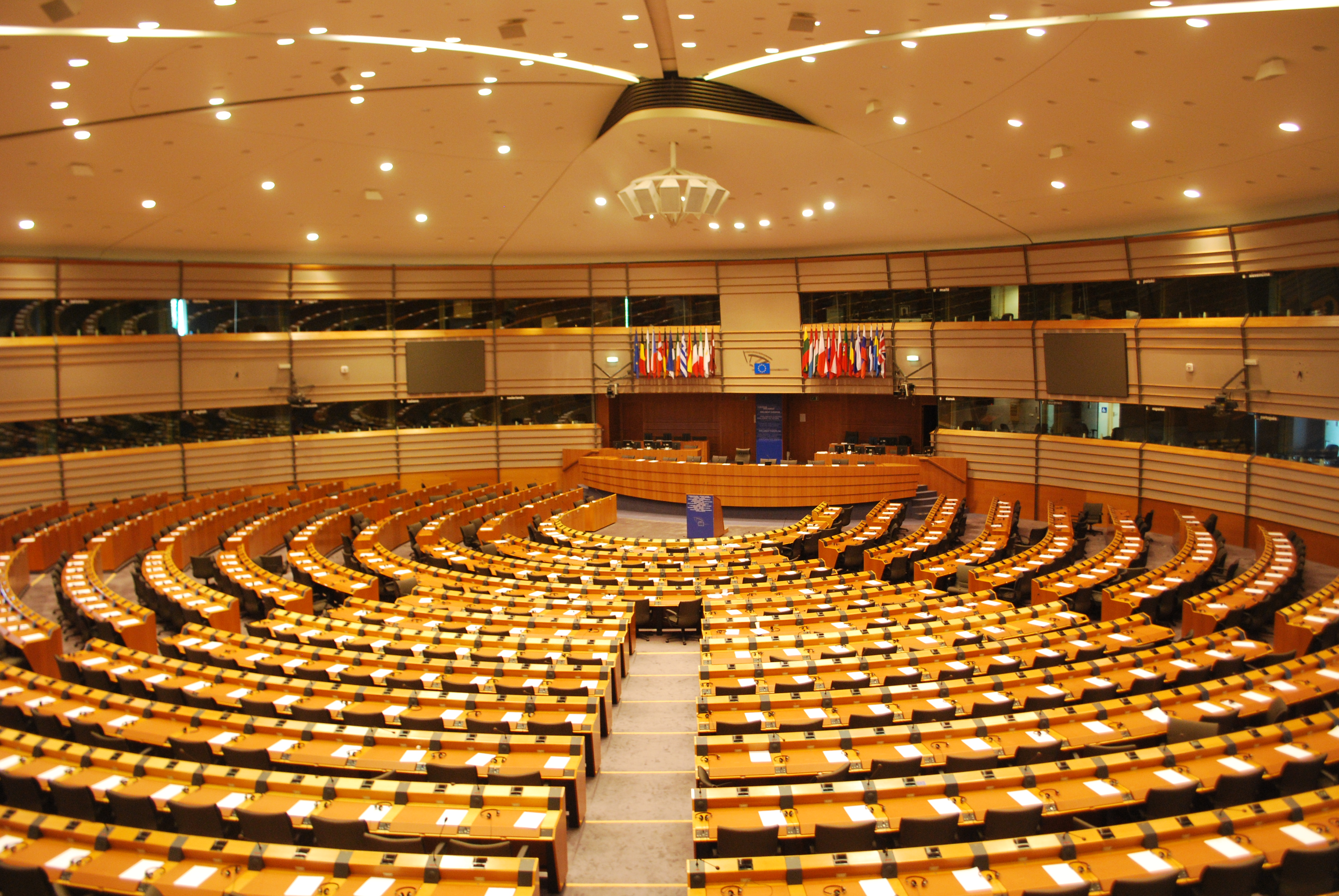
European Parliament, Brussels, Belgium

The European Parliament Liaison Office in Washington DC (EPLO) is the US office of the European Parliament (EP) responsible for developing relationships between the US Congress and the European Parliament on issues calling for trans-Atlantic legislative and political cooperation. It attempts to build a trans-Atlantic network of legislators and legislative staffers focused on issues of mutual concern. Former European Parliament President Jerzy Buzek inaugurated the office on April 29, 2010. EPLO is the only European Parliament office outside the European Union, residing at 2175 K Street, N.W. Washington, D.C.

== History and Activities ==

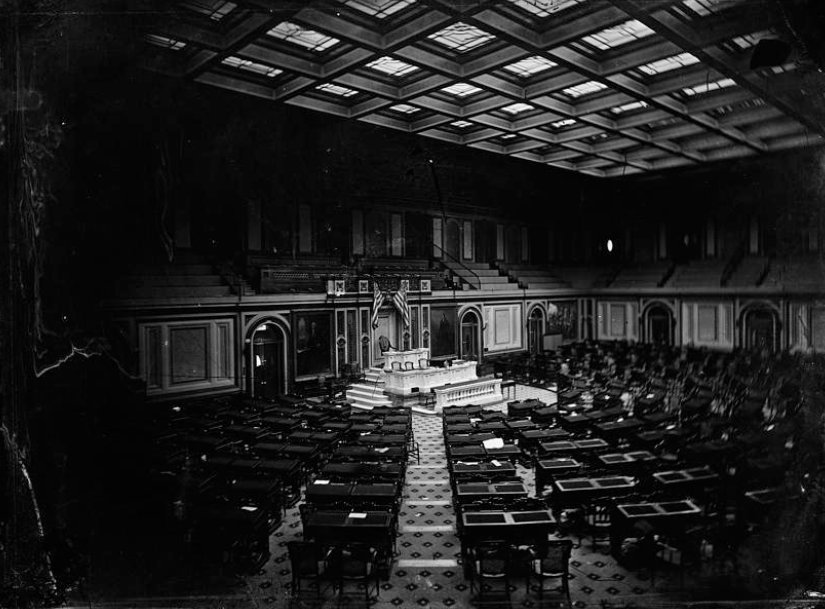
House of Representatives, US Congress, District of Columbia

In January 1999 at the 50th Interparliamentary meeting in Strasbourg, European Parliament and US Congress delegations agreed to establish the Transatlantic Legislators' Dialogue (TLD), an ongoing effort to fortify the parliamentary ties called for in the New Transatlantic Agenda of 1995 (EP-US Congress ties date to 1972, when the first US Congressional delegation visited the EP in Strasbourg). EPLO facilitates this growing legislative exchange. Today, the TLD comprises bi-annual meetings (alternating between the US and EU capitals) on a number of topics of common interests (e.g., job creation and competitiveness, trade, cybersecurity, energy, foreign policy). The TLD brings together Members of the European Parliament (MEPs) with their US Congressional counterparts.

EPLO facilitates other inter-parliamentary activities including videoconferences, special working groups, and the facilitation of committee-to-committee exchanges between legislative committees of the European Parliament and the US Congress. EPLO coordinates its efforts with those of the Delegation of the European Union to the United States, under the direction of EU Ambassador Stavros Lambrinidis.

The current EPLO director has been Walter Goetz since September 2023. EPLO comprises a number of European staffers and policy experts and American interns.
