= Dimitrios Droutsas =

Greek lawyer and politician

Dimitrios Droutsas Δημήτριος Δρούτσας
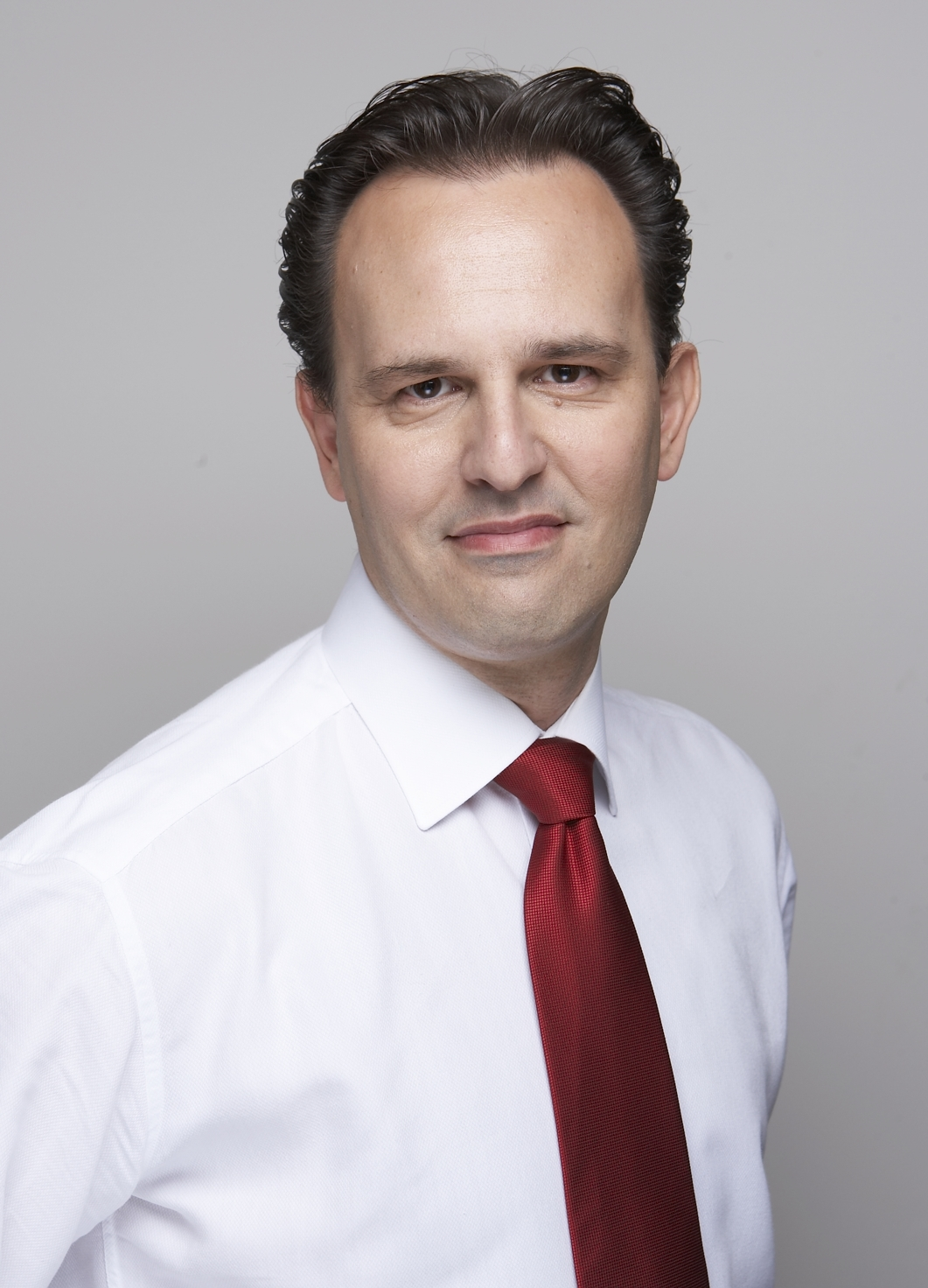

Minister of Foreign Affairs
- In office 7 September 2010 – 17 June 2011
- Prime Minister: George Papandreou
- Preceded by: George Papandreou
- Succeeded by: Stavros Lambrinidis

Personal details
- Born: 5 August 1968 (age 58) Nicosia, Cyprus
- Party: Panhellenic Socialist Movement
- Spouse: Faye Karaviti
- Education: University of Vienna

Dimitrios P. Droutsas (Greek: Δημήτριος Π. Δρούτσας; born 5 August 1968) is a Greek lawyer and politician, who served as the Minister of Foreign Affairs of Greece in 2010–11. He became MP of the European Parliament by replacing Stavros Lambrinidis, who went on to become Minister of Foreign Affairs of Greece.

== Early life ==
Droutsas was born on 5 August 1968 in Nicosia, Cyprus, the son of a Greek father and a German mother from Frankfurt am Main. After primary school the family moved to Vienna, where his father worked at the Greek embassy. In Vienna he was educated at the Theresianum and later studied at University of Vienna School of Law, graduating in 1994 with a paper on the accession of Cyprus to the European Union.

== Political career ==
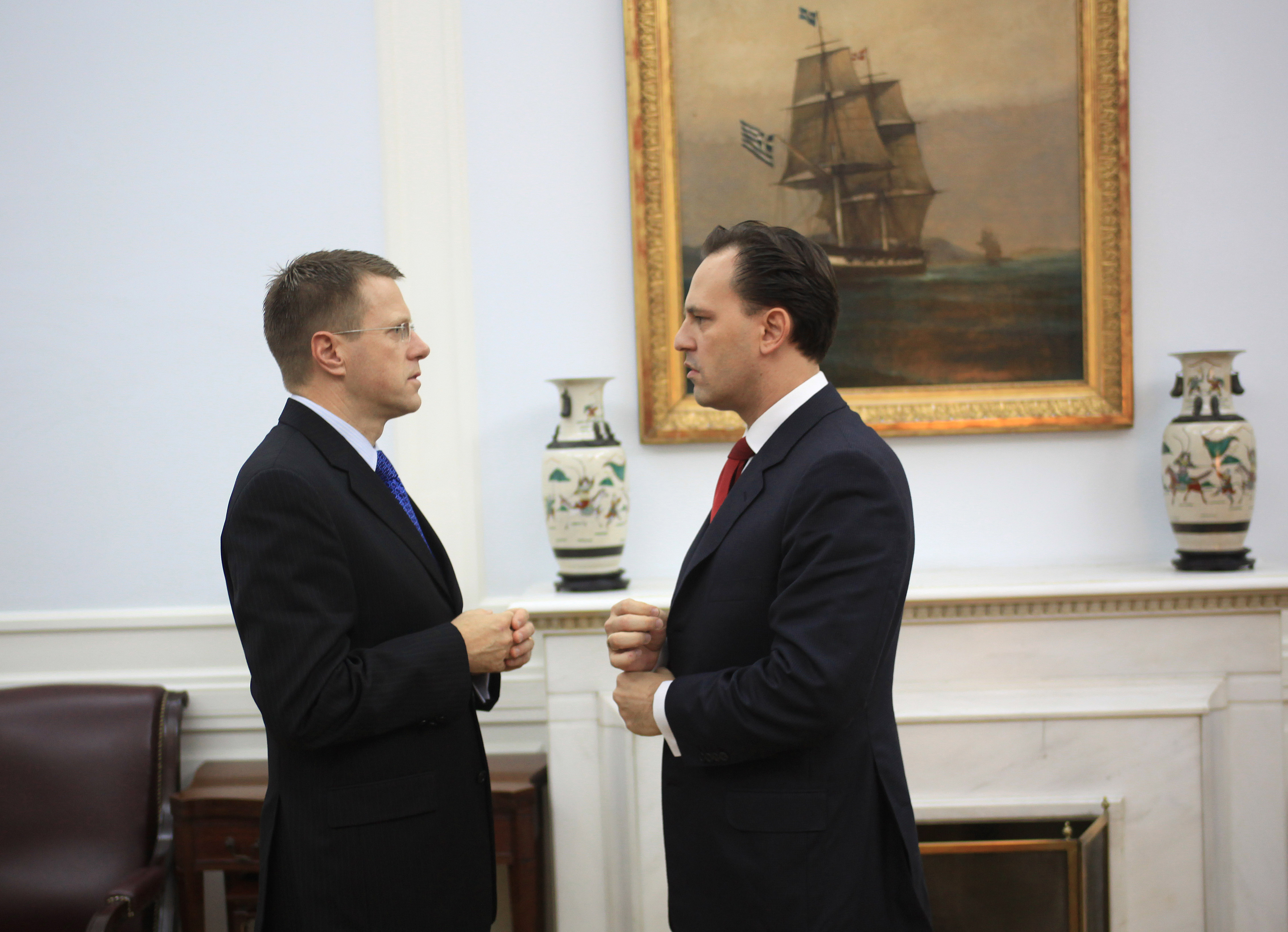
Dimitrios Droutsas as Greek Foreign Minister meeting with Slovenian Foreign Minister Samuel Zbogar in October 2010

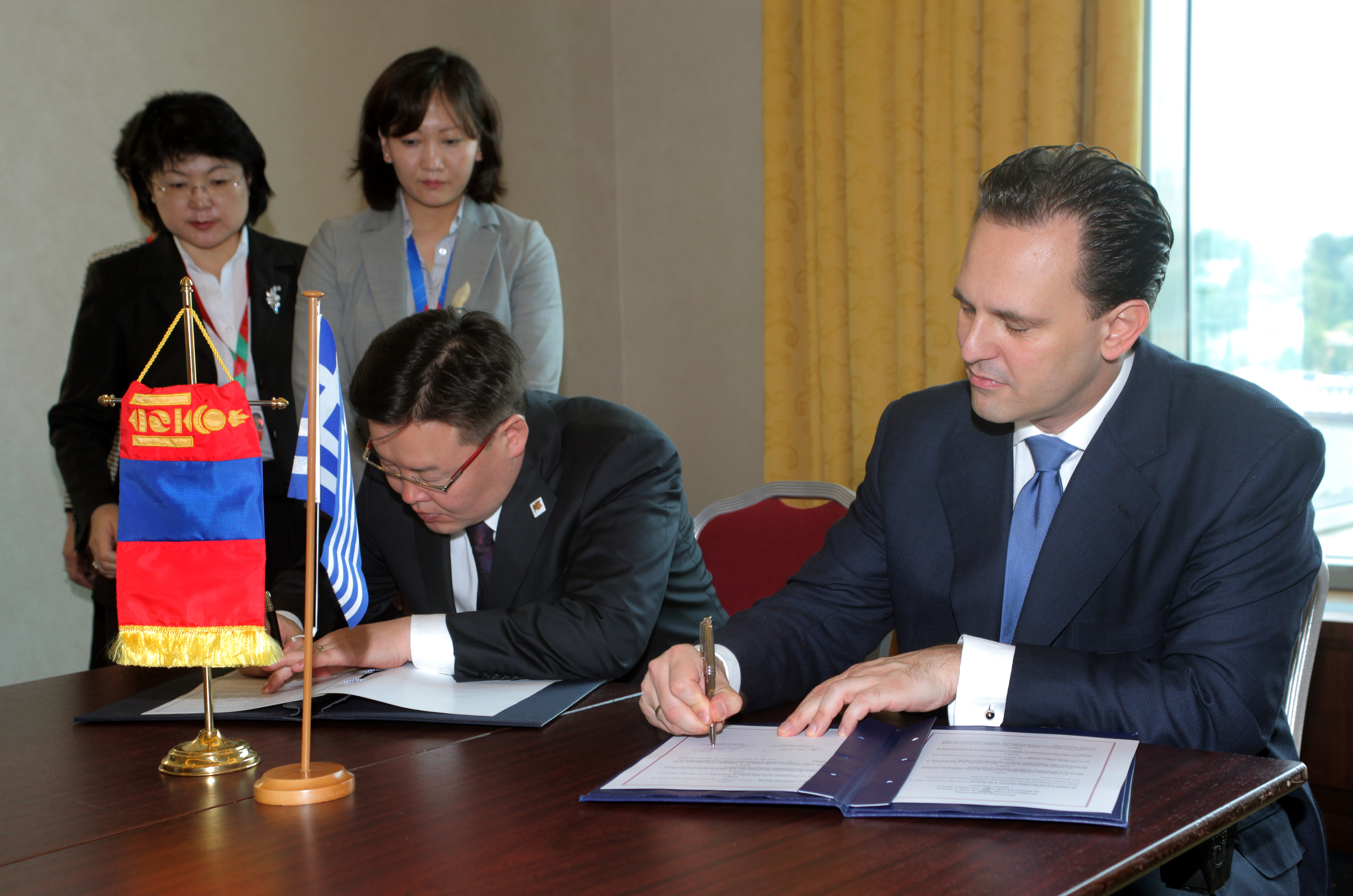
Droutsas with Gombojavyn Zandanshatar in June 2011.

In 1999, Droutsas went back to Greece to serve as the Special Advisor to Minister of Foreign Affairs of Greece, George Papandreou. Among the important issues, he advised on were political rapprochement with Turkey, Cyprus’s accession to the EU and the Cyprus problem. In March 2004, he was appointed the Director of the Diplomatic Cabinet of the President of Panhellenic Socialist Movement (Pasok) George A. Papandreou. From March 2008, he served as the spokesperson of Pasok and in May 2008, he was appointed its Secretary for Foreign Policy and International Relations. On 7 September 2010 Droutsas was appointed the Minister of Foreign Affairs of Greece in a cabinet reshuffle. His first tour as a foreign minister was to the Middle East from October 17 to October 20 with stops in Jordan, Israel and Palestinian territories, Egypt and Lebanon.

In the 17 June 2011 cabinet reshuffle, Droutsas was removed as Minister of Foreign Affairs to take over as Member of the European Parliament from Stavros Lambrinidis for the remaining period of the 7th Parliamentary Term (22 June 2011 – 30 June 2014). In turn, Stavros Lambrinidis became the new Minister of Foreign Affairs. The demotion of Droutsas came after revelations that he had misrepresented his background, both formal qualification and experience, with claims that he had completed his doctoral thesis at the University of Vienna and that he had worked as a professor or assistant professor, claims that were proved to be untrue.

Droutsas' works on European Law, International and European Commercial Law, and Foreign and Defense Policy have been published extensively in Greece and abroad.

He speaks German, English, French and Russian. He is married to Faye Karaviti, who is a journalist.

== See also ==
- Politics of Greece

Political offices
Preceded by George Papandreou	Minister for Foreign Affairs; 2010–2011	Succeeded by Stavros Lambrinidis
