= Institute For Education =

U.S. think tank

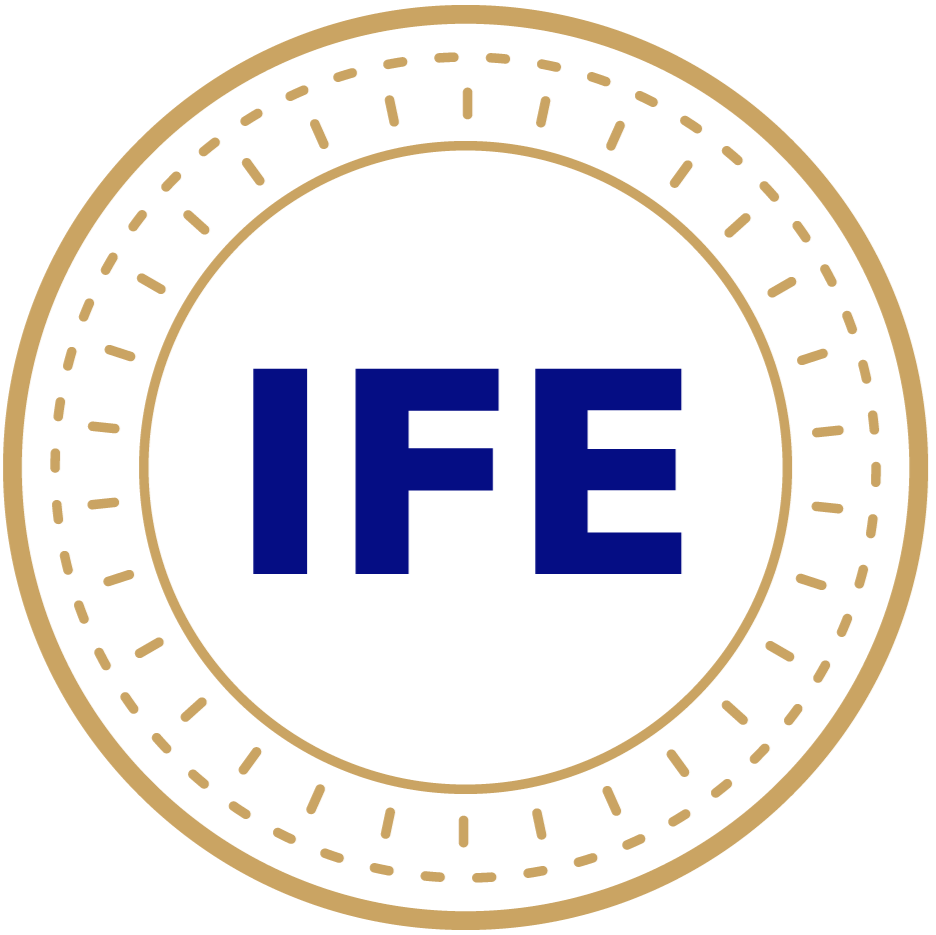
- Industry: Public Policy
- Founded: 1991, Washington, DC
- Founder: Kathy Kemper
- Website: www.instituteforeducation.org

The Institute For Education, known as IFE, is a U.S. 501(c)(3) nonprofit organization headquartered in Washington, DC. The organization facilitates bipartisan collaboration by convening and networking high-level leaders from the bounds of politics, business, media, academia, and more. A selection of guests hosted by the Institute include Hillary Rodham Clinton, John McCain, Antonin Scalia, Orrin Hatch, Ruth Bader Ginsburg and Arianna Huffington.

The Institute regularly holds exclusive events hosted at embassies and private residences. The most high profile of these events is the INFO Roundtables, which have been hosted by prominent leaders including Supreme Court justices, governors, Cabinet secretaries, CIA and FBI directors, Nobel laureates, and professional athletes.

The Institute for Education was founded by Coach Kathy Kemper. Former National Security Counsel member R. David Edelman serves as the organization’s current president. Political commentator Kaivan Shroff is a Senior Advisor.

== History ==
Founder and CEO Kathy Kemper created the Institute for Education in 1991 when her husband, James Valentine, suggested she organize a breakfast to introduce her political contacts with his business colleagues. IFE established a reputation for diplomacy by facilitating the first-ever regional summit between the Governors of Maryland, Virginia, and the Mayor of DC (Bob Ehrlich, Mark Warner, and Anthony A. Williams respectively.)

Since 2012, the Institute for Education has shown a greater focus on technology and innovation, praising collaboration between the federal government and private sector, as seen by the Presidential Innovation Fellow (PIF) program. Two of the four founders of the PIF program are members of IFE Leadership: former U.S. Chief Technology Officer Todd Park and former White House Office of Science and Technology Policy Senior Advisor for Innovation John Paul Farmer.

In 2015, IFE partnered with the Viterbi School of Engineering at the University of Southern California to offer a free coding summer camp for underrepresented populations from grades K-12 around the Los Angeles area.

In 2016, the Institute for Education celebrated the anniversary of its 25th season.

== Notable people ==
- Kathy Kemper: Founder and CEO
- H.E. Jean-Arthur Regibeau, Ambassador of the Kingdom of Belgium and IFE Diplomatic Steward
- H.E. Stavros Lambrinidis, Ambassador of the European Union and IFE Diplomatic Steward of AI
- Devika Anand Patil, IFE Digital Ambassador, IFE Board of Stewards
- Matt Cutts, IFE Board of Stewards
- Dr. R. David Edelman, IFE Board of Stewards
- John Paul Farmer, IFE Board of Stewards
- Tom Friedman, IFE Board of Stewards
- Amy Geng, MD, IFE Innovation Steward, IFE Board of Stewards
- Kristen Honey, PhD, IFE Director of Innovation, IFE Board of Stewards
- Andrea MItchell, IFE Board of Stewards
- Todd Park, IFE Board of Stewards
- Megan Smith, IFE Board of Stewards
- Judge William Webster, IFE Board of Stewards
