= European Institute =

The European Institute
- Formation: 1989
- Headquarters: Washington, D.C., United States
- Website: www.europeaninstitute.org

The European Institute is a nonpartisan public policy organization dedicated to Transatlantic relations. The Institute was founded in 1989 and is based in Washington, D.C. It regularly hosts forums, roundtable discussions, and programs with political and business leaders from the U.S. and Europe. Additionally, the Institute publishes the e-journal European Affairs.

== Mission and focus ==
According to the Institute's website, the organization's mission is "to provide an independent forum for US and European government and corporate decision makers, officials from multilateral organizations, foreign and economic policy analysts, and expert journalists to discuss issues of common concern and develop effective and mutually beneficial solutions."

The Institute's programs generally fall into the following 10 categories: Defense and Civil Security; Trade and Investment; Financial and Monetary Affairs; Energy and Environment; Transportation; IT and Telecommunications; Aeronautics and Space; Biotechnology, Food Safety and Consumer Protection; Transatlantic Governance and EU-US-Russia Triangular Relations.

== Location ==
The European Institute is based in Washington, D.C., with offices overlooking Farragut Square at 1001 Connecticut Avenue, NW, Suite 220.

== Membership ==
The European Institute works closely with the European Commission, the European Council and the European Parliament, the US Administration and Congress, leading multinational corporations from both the US and Europe, national governments, and several multilateral organizations. It is granted Special Consultative Status with the UN Economic and Social Council (ECOSOC).

Current European governments participating are: Austria, Belgium, Bulgaria, Cyprus, the Czech Republic, Denmark, Estonia, Finland, France, Germany, Greece, Hungary, Ireland, Italy, Latvia, Lithuania, Liechtenstein, Luxembourg, Malta, the Netherlands, Norway, Poland, Portugal, Romania, The Russian Federation, Slovenia, the Slovak Republic, Spain, Sweden, Switzerland and the United Kingdom.

== Board members ==
Notable current and former members of the European Institute's Board of Advisors and/or Board of Directors:

- Jacqueline Grapin, founder of the European Institute, co-chair of the Board of Directors
- Ambassador Günter Burghardt, former European Union Ambassador to the United States
- Bertrand Collomb, Honorary Chairman of the Board of Lafarge
- Jacques Delors, twice President of the European Commission
- Ambassador C. Boyden Gray, Gray & Schmitz LLP, former Special Envoy for European Affairs and for Eurasian Energy
- Ambassador Robert E. Hunter, former U.S. Ambassador to NATO
- T. Allen McArtor, chairman, Airbus North America Holdings
- Robert Siegel (past member), host of NPR program All Things Considered
- Peter Sutherland (past member), chairman, Goldman Sachs International
- Simone Veil (past member), former President of the European Parliament
- Robert Zoellick (past member), President of the World Bank

== European Affairs ==
Since 2000, the European Institute has published the quarterly policy journal European Affairs, which is now an e-journal, accompanied by a blog. The current issue includes articles by Hoover Institute fellow, Kori Schake; Frederick Kempe, head of the Atlantic Council and Damon Wilson, Director of its International Security Program; and Robert Hunter, former US Ambassador to NATO, now Senior Advisor at the RAND Corporation.

== See also ==
- Transatlantic relations
- Euro-American relations
