= Jovita Neliupšienė =

Lithuanian politician (born 1980)

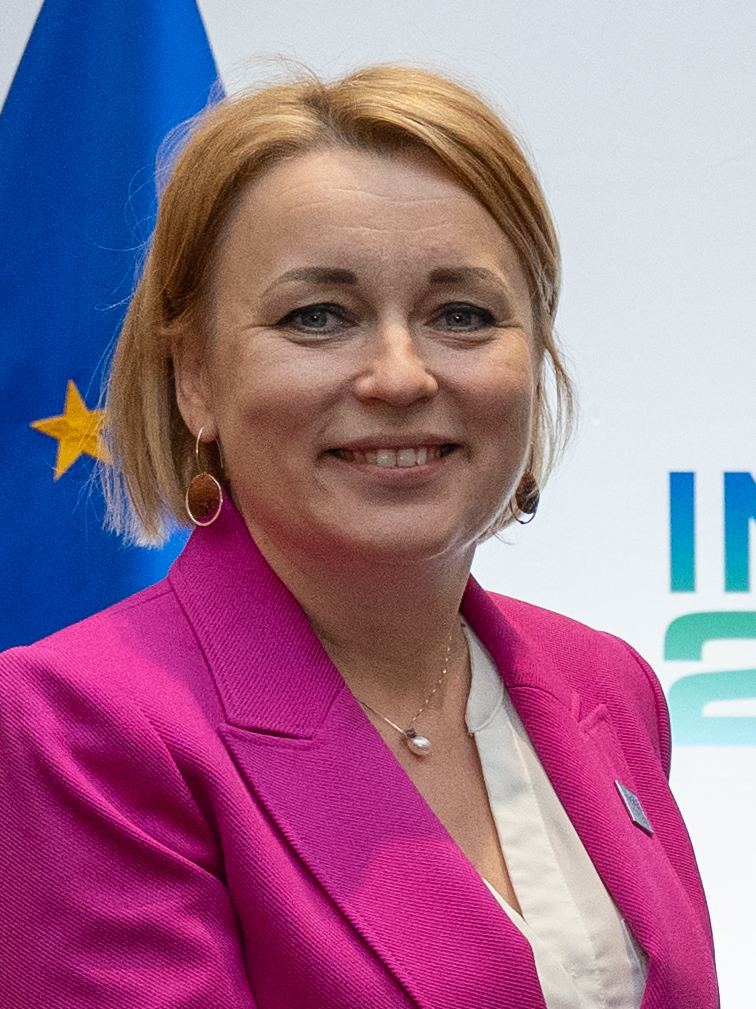

Ambassador of the European Union to the United States
- Incumbent
- Assumed office January 2024
- Preceded by: Stavros Lambrinidis

Vice Minister of Economy and Innovation
- In office 2020–2022

Lithuanian Ambassador to the European Union
- In office 18 August 2015 – September 2020
- Preceded by: Raimundas Karoblis
- Succeeded by: Arnoldas Pranckevičius

Personal details
- Born: Jovita Pranevičiūtė; 3 January 1980 (age 46) Panevėžys, Lithuania, Soviet Union

Jovita Neliupšienė (née Pranevičiūtė; born on 3 January 1980) is a Lithuanian politician and former Chief Foreign Policy Adviser to President Dalia Grybauskaitė who is currently the Ambassador of the European Union to the United States. She was the Chancellor of the Ministry of Foreign Affairs in 2020 and Vice Minister of Economy and Innovation from 2020 until 2022. Neliupšienė had also served as the Lithuanian ambassador to the European Union from 2015 to 2020.

== Biography ==
Jovita Neliupšienė was born in Panevėžys on 3 January 1980.

From 1998 to 2004, she studied at Vilnius University and graduated with a bachelor's and master's degrees in international relations and diplomacy. From 2000 to 2004, she studied law at Mykolas Romeris University. She worked in the Seimas, the Ministry of Foreign Affairs, and the Lithuanian Embassy in Belarus. Since 2006, she taught at Vilnius University Institute of International Relations and Political Science. In 2009, she defended her doctoral dissertation on the topic “National self-awareness and the formation of statehood: the experience of the CIS countries”, and became an associate professor.

In 2009, she advised President Grybauskaitė, and coordinated the issues of the European Council meetings. In 2012, after Darius Semaška's departure, she became the president's Chief Adviser - Head of the Foreign Policy Group. On 18 August 2015, Neliupšienė became the Lithuanian ambassador to the European Union, until August 2020.

As of 2015, Neliupšienė was one of the 89 people from the European Union against whom Russia had imposed sanctions.

She was interviewed by Cecilia Vega for a 60 Minutes story on "mysterious Russian death syndrome", which was broadcast in November 2024.
