= Delegation of the European Union to the United Nations =

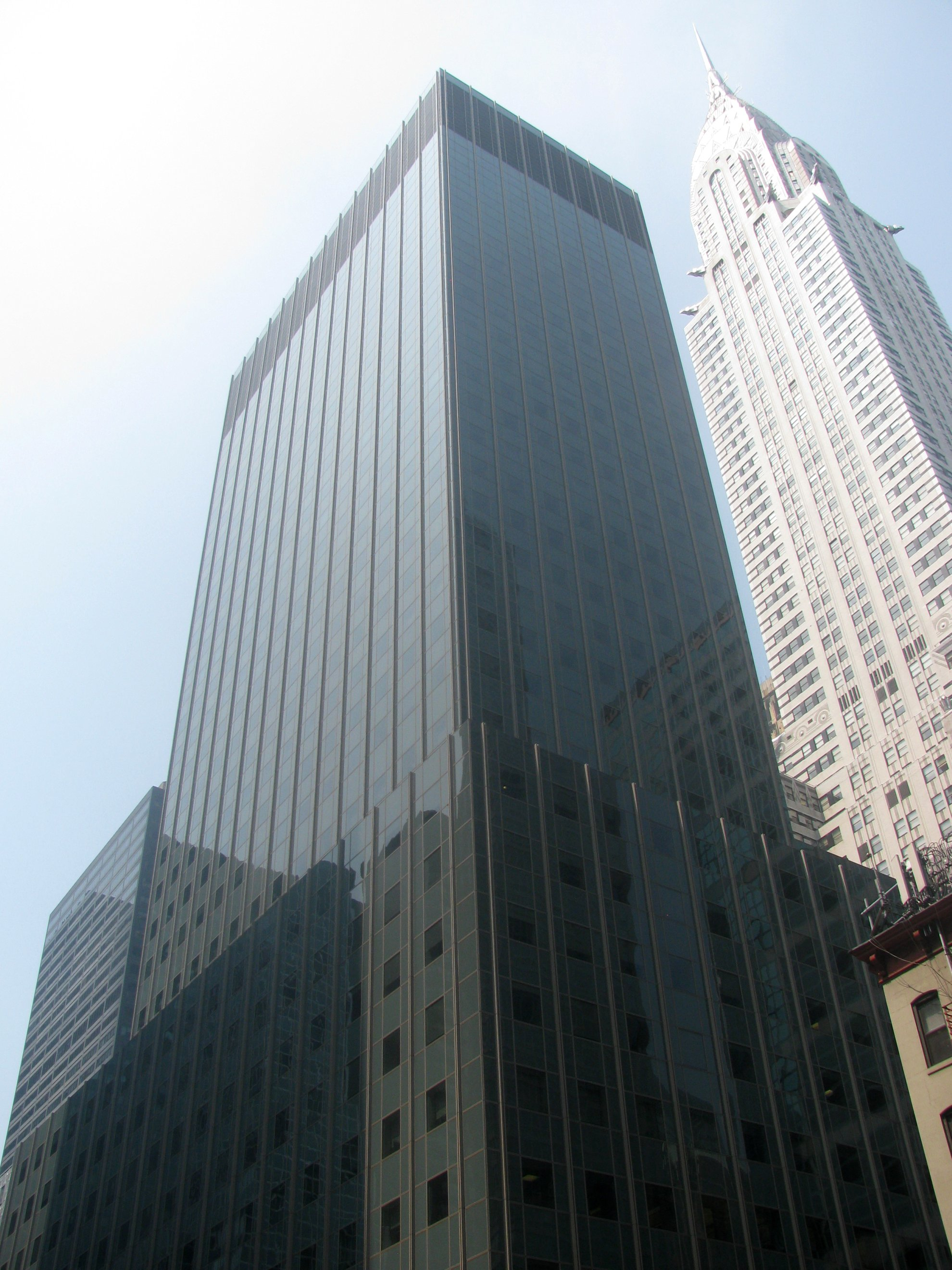
666 3rd Avenue, the location of the Delegation's New York offices

The Delegation of the European Union to the United Nations represents the European Union in the United Nations, working in coordination with the diplomatic missions of all the EU Member States.

== Offices ==
The European Union is represented by delegations accredited to UN bodies in:

- Geneva
- Paris
- Nairobi
- New York City
- Rome
- Vienna

== Ambassadors ==
Ambassador Stavros Lambrinidis is the Head of the Delegation of the European Union to the United Nations since January 2024. Previously, he was the Head of the European Union Delegation to the United States. His predecessor was Olof Skoog, who was appointed European Union Special Representative for Human Rights in March 2024.

== See also ==
- European Union and the United Nations
- List of ambassadors of the European Union
