= Service for Foreign Policy Instruments =

Department of the European Commission

The Service for Foreign Policy Instruments (FPI) is a department of the European Commission set up in response to the establishment of the European External Action Service (EEAS). The EEAS merged the Commission's Directorate-General for External Relations (and various other departments) with its counterparts in the Council of Ministers. The responsible Commissioner for the service is the High Representative of the Union for Foreign Affairs and Security Policy Kaja Kallas in her role as Commission Vice-President. The current Head of Service is Peter M. Wagner.

The Service is a Commission department managing foreign policy issues within the Commission's mandate; those areas not transferred to the EEAS and which fall outside the mandate of the EuropeAid Development and Cooperation DG. It works with the EEAS in the same building, the Triangle building in Brussels. It manages programmes such as the crisis response Instrument for Stability, which is shared between the Commission and EEAS.

Specifically its tasks include:

- the Common Foreign and Security Policy (CFSP);
- the Instrument contributing to Stability and Peace (IcSP) - The IcSP is an EU instrument to support security initiatives and peace-building activities in partner countries. It was established in 2014 to take over from the Instrument for Stability (IfS).
- the Partnership Instrument
- the Instrument for Cooperation with Industrialised Countries (ICI); and
- Election Observation Missions (EOMs).

The FPI is also responsible for managing some foreign policy regulatory instruments:

- CFSP sanctions;
- Kimberley Process certification scheme (for rough diamonds); and
- Prevention of trade in goods that could be used for capital punishment or torture

== See also ==
- EuropeAid Development and Cooperation
- DG Enlargement
- DG Trade
- European Commission's Humanitarian Office
