= Trade defence instrument =

A trade defence instrument is a European Union anti-dumping, anti-subsidy, or safeguard measure carried out to defend its producers against unfairly traded or subsidised imports and against dramatic shifts in trade flows in so far as these are harmful to the EU economy.

The use of trade defence instruments by the European Union is based on rules set by the World Trade Organization.
