= Directorate-General for External Relations =

Directorate-General for the External Relations

Department overview
- Formed: 1958
- Dissolved: 1 December 2011
- Superseding Department: European External Action Service Foreign Policy Instruments Service
- Type: Department
- Headquarters: Charlemagne building Brussels, Belgium; 50°50′37.14″N 4°22′49.12″E
- Department executives: Benita Ferrero-Waldner, External Relations Commissioner; David O'Sullivan, Director General

The Directorate-General for the External Relations (DG RELEX, DG E VIII) was a Directorate-General of the European Commission, responsible for the external policy. The DG was merged into the European External Action Service in 2010, then headed by High Representative Catherine Ashton.

== Role ==
"The Directorate-General for External Relations contributed to the formulation by the Commissioner for External Relations, together with her colleagues of an effective and coherent external relations policy for the European Union, so as to enable the EU to assert its identity on the international scene." To this end DG RELEX worked closely with other Directorates-General, notably DG Development, DG Enlargement, DG Trade, EuropeAid Co-Operation Office and European Commission's Humanitarian Office (ECHO).

The DG operated the 120 Delegations and Offices around the world. In October 2010 David O'Sullivan was made the last Director General of RELEX (as he then became the first the chief operating officer of the EEAS) and the Deputy Director General was Karel Kovanda (2008). Prior to O'Sullivan taking over, the director-general was Eneko Landaburu (2003–2009), then João Vale de Almeida (2009–2010).

== Merger ==
Under the Lisbon Treaty, the European External Action Service (EEAS) took over RELEX's functions, merging them with its counterparts in the Council of the European Union as of 1 December 2010. Under the second Barroso Commission, the elements of RELEX relating to international climate change negotiations were transferred to the new Climate Action DG. This was in preparation for the merger as not all foreign policy DGs were to be merged but elements of a number. A minor turf war erupted as the Commission attempted to retain control of certain policy areas in the face of EEAS' consolidation. Those areas of RELEX that the commission retains but needs close cooperation with the EEAS were established in a new DG, the Foreign Policy Instruments Service.
