= Stavros Lambrinidis =

Greek lawyer and politician

- Σταύρος Λαμπρινίδης
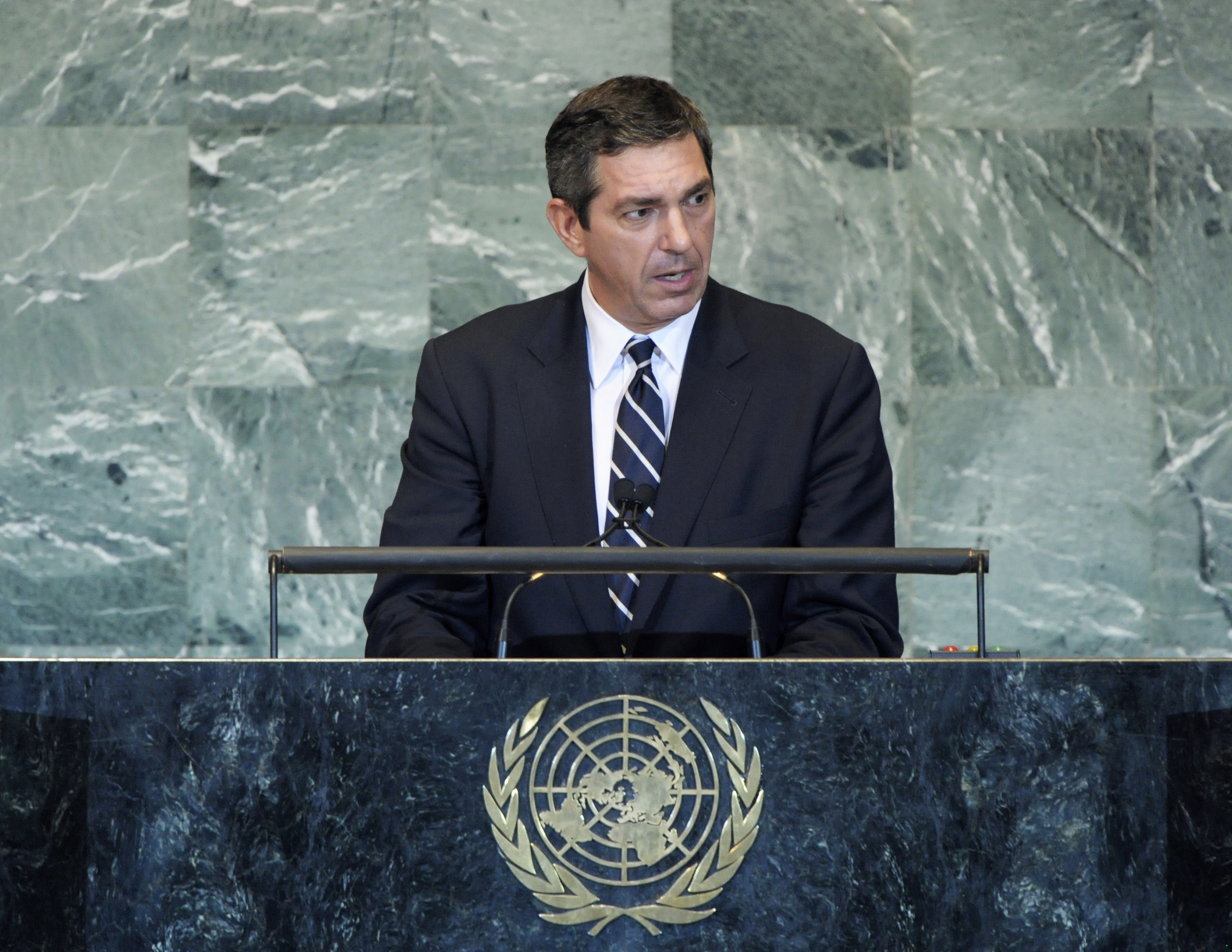
- Lambrinidis in 2011

Ambassador of the European Union to the United Nations
- Incumbent
- Assumed office 15 January 2024
- President: Ursula von der Leyen
- Preceded by: Olof Skoog

Ambassador of the European Union to the United States
- In office 4 March 2019 – 31 December 2023
- President: Jean-Claude Juncker; Ursula von der Leyen
- Preceded by: David O'Sullivan
- Succeeded by: Jovita Neliupšienė

European Union Special Representative for Human Rights
- In office 25 July 2012 – 20 February 2019
- President: José Manuel Barroso; Jean-Claude Juncker
- Preceded by: New office
- Succeeded by: Eamon Gilmore

Minister of Foreign Affairs
- In office 17 June 2011 – 11 November 2011
- Prime Minister: George Papandreou
- Preceded by: Dimitrios Droutsas
- Succeeded by: Stavros Dimas

3rd Vice-president of the European Parliament
- In office 14 July 2009 – 16 June 2011
- President: Jerzy Buzek
- Preceded by: Gérard Onesta
- Succeeded by: Anni Podimata

Member of the European Parliament
- In office 20 July 2004 – 16 June 2011
- Constituency: Greece

Personal details
- Born: 6 February 1962 (age 64) Athens, Kingdom of Greece
- Party: PASOK
- Spouse: Phoebe Kapouano (m. 1998)
- Children: 1
- Education: Amherst College (BA); Yale University (JD)
- Website: Official website

Stavros Lambrinidis (Greek: Σταύρος Λαμπρινίδης; born 6 February 1962) is a Greek lawyer and politician, currently serving as Ambassador of the European Union to the United Nations. He was previously Ambassador of the European Union to the United States from March 2019 until December 2023, European Union special representative for human rights from 2012 to 2019 and Minister for Foreign Affairs in Greece from June 2011 to November 2011.

== Early life ==
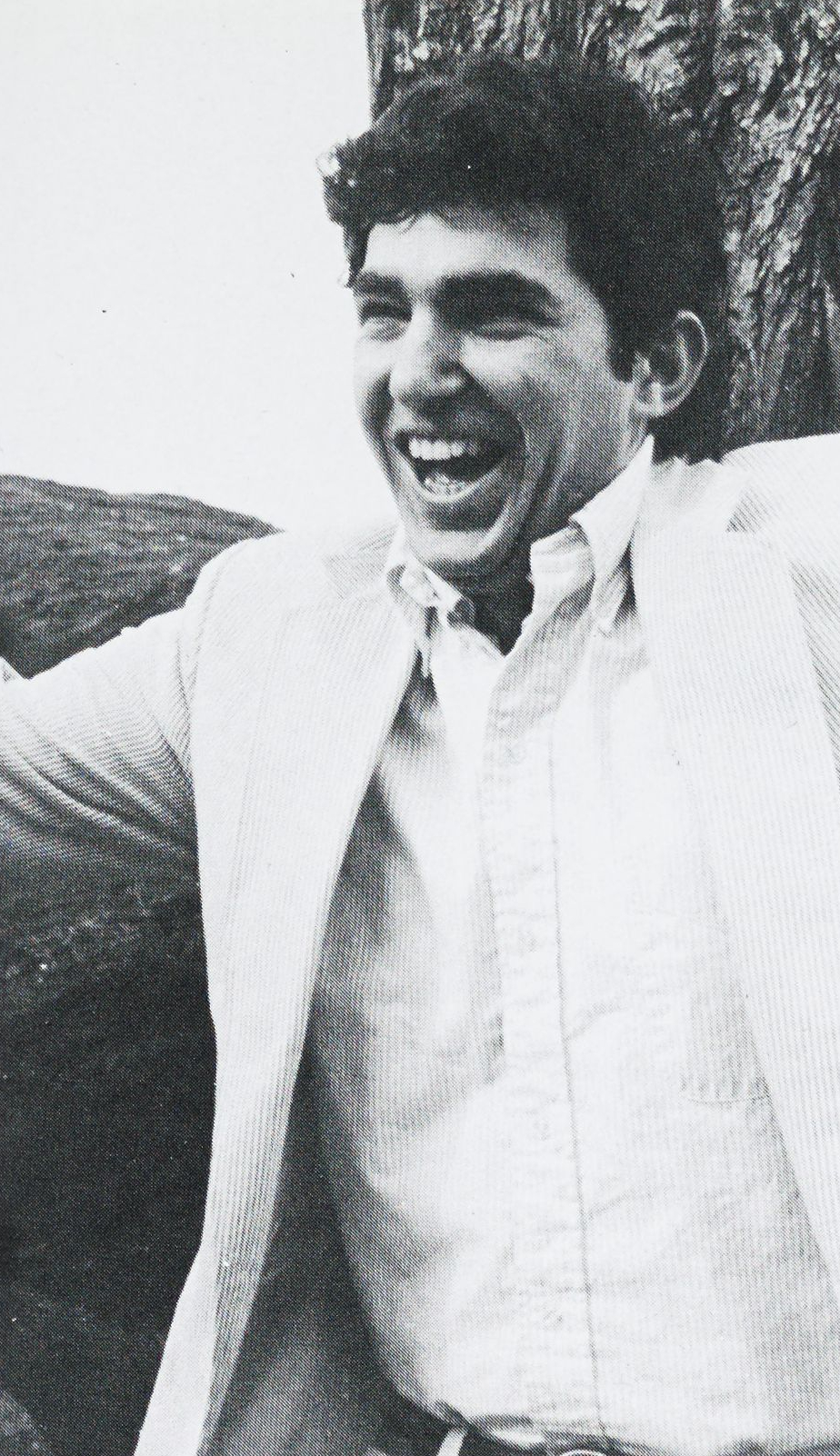
Lambrinidis in the Amherst College yearbook, 1984

Lambrinidis was born in Athens on 6 February 1962. After graduating from the Athens College high school, Lambrinidis was admitted to the University of Chicago in 1980 and transferred to Amherst College in 1981, where he received his B.A. degree in economics and political science with the distinctions of magna cum laude, Phi Beta Kappa and a scholarship for the rest of his studies. He completed his education in 1988 with a J.D. degree from Yale Law School.

At Yale University, Lambrinidis worked as a teaching assistant in the School of Organization and Management and was the managing editor of The Yale Journal of International Law.

== Early career ==
Lambrinidis trained in international trade, transactions and arbitration, as a colleague of Lloyd Cutler (the founder of Wilmer, Cutler & Pickering in Washington, D.C. and law advisor of the White House during Jimmy Carter's and Bill Clinton's presidencies). He was also president of the Committee for Human Rights in the Bar Association of Washington, D.C..

Lambrinidis's career in Greece started in 1994 as a special advisor to former Prime Minister of Greece and President of the Socialist International George A. Papandreou, and continued as the chief-of-staff of the Minister of Foreign Affairs during Theodoros Pangalos's post in the ministry in 1996. Between 1996 and 1999, he was secretary general of the Greek foreign affairs ministry responsible for diaspora Greeks. He subsequently became an Ambassador at Large of the Hellenic Republic and, in 2000, the director general of the International Olympic Truce Center (International Olympic Committee organization).

During this period, Lambrinidis was a visiting lecturer at the International Olympic Academy in Athens, as well as a lecturer in the Diplomatic and Police Academies of Greece. He was also a guest speaker at the World Economic Forum in Davos, Switzerland, in 2003 and 2004.

== European Parliament ==
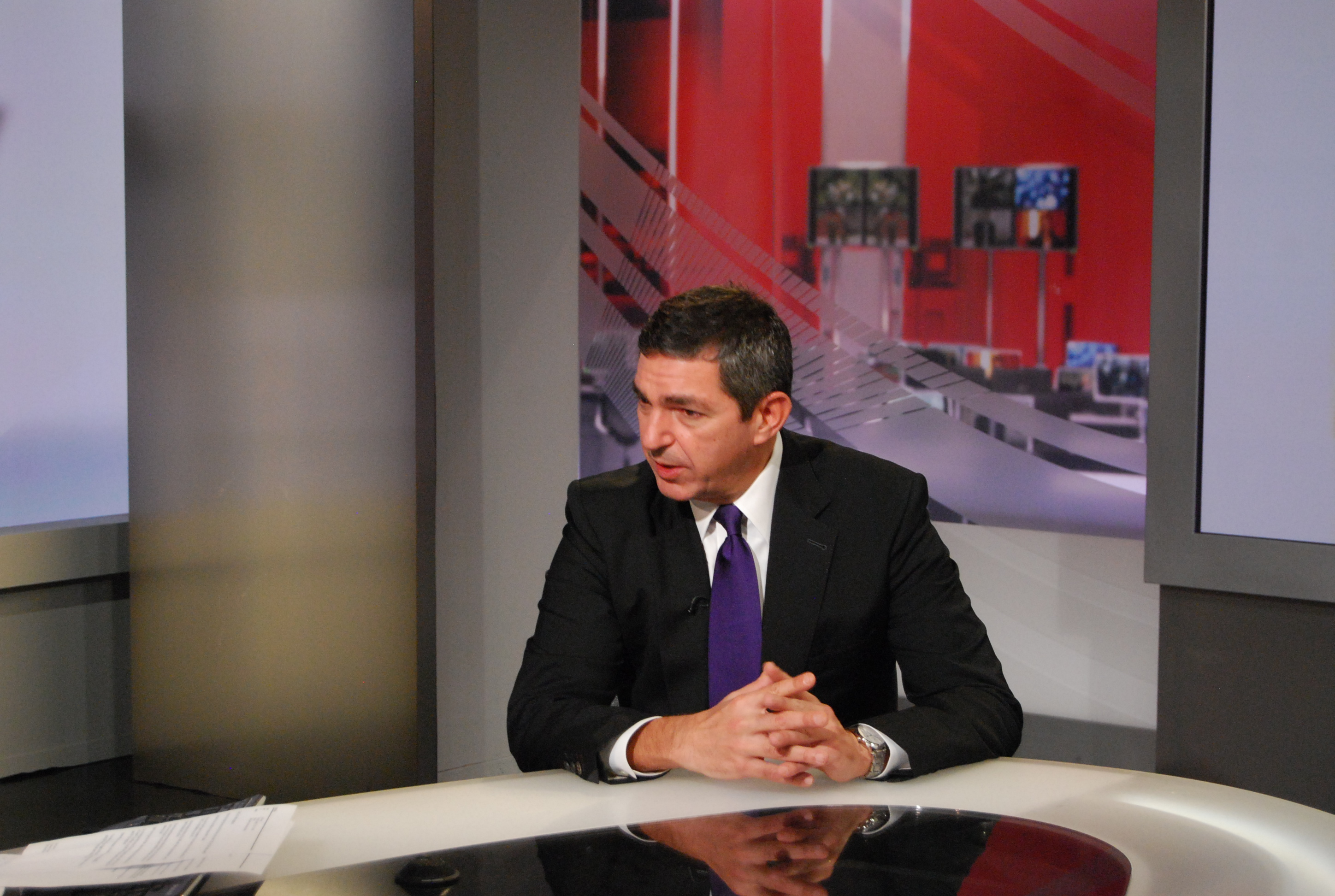
Foreign Minister Stavros Lambrinidis' interview on BBC News in October 2011

Lambrinidis started his career in the European Parliament on 20 July 2004, as a member of the European Parliament for the Greek Social Democratic Party PA.SO.K. A few months later, he was elected as the vice president of the Party of European Socialists and, in April 2005, as head of the parliamentary delegation of Panhellenic Socialist Movement (PA.SO.K.) to the European Parliament.

During this term, Lambrinidis was a vice president of the parliament's Committee on Civil Liberties, Justice and Home Affairs (LIBE), a Member of the Delegation of Relations with the United States, as well as a substitute-member of the Delegation of Relations with Iran and the Committee of Constitutional Affairs.

In July 2009, Lambrinidis was elected as a Vice President of the European Parliament, while in November 2010, he was a speaker of the European Data Protection and Privacy Conference.

== Minister for Foreign Affairs ==
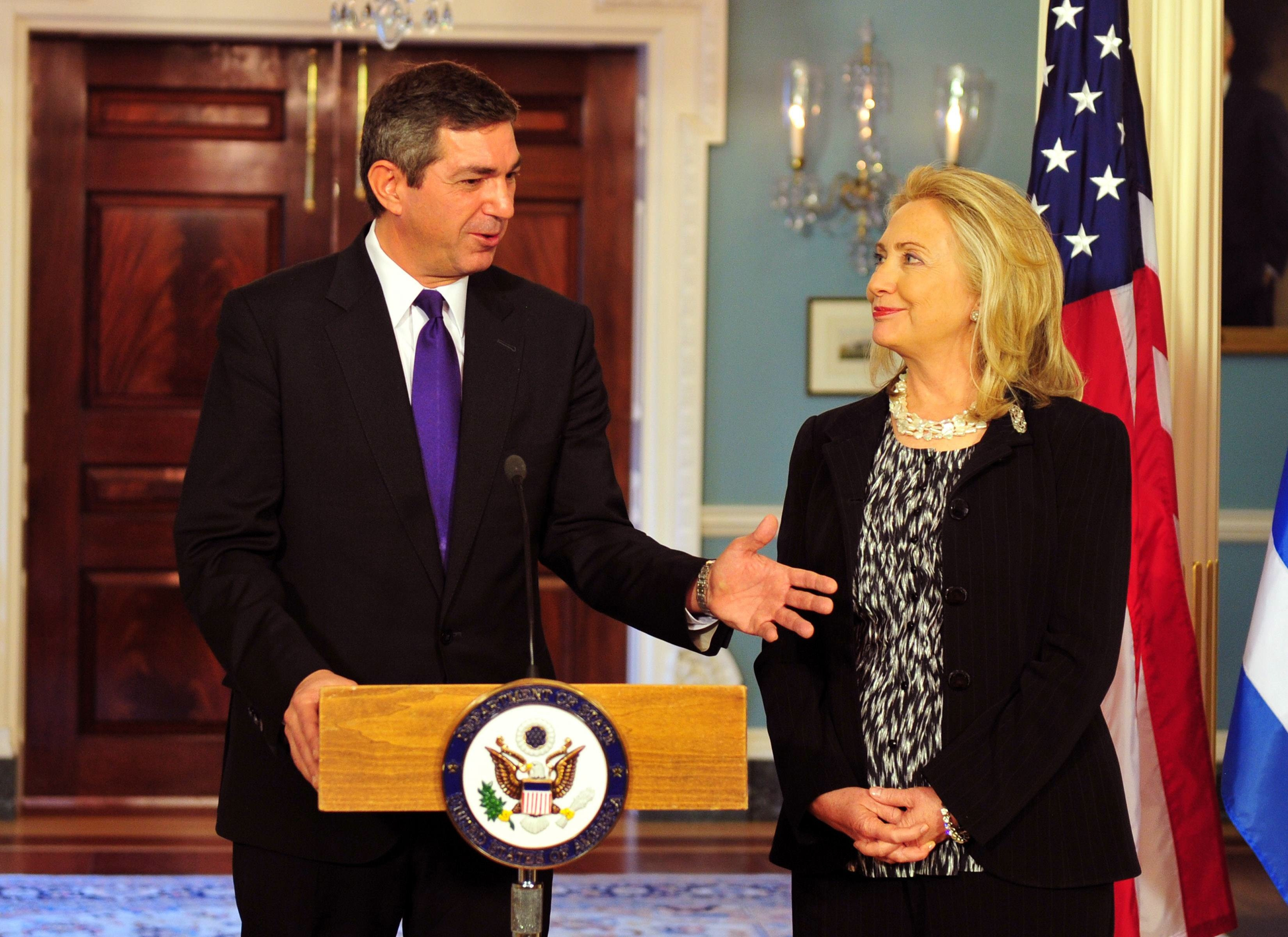
Foreign Minister of Greece, Stavros Lambrinidis, with U.S. Secretary of State, Hillary Clinton joint press conference State Department October 2011

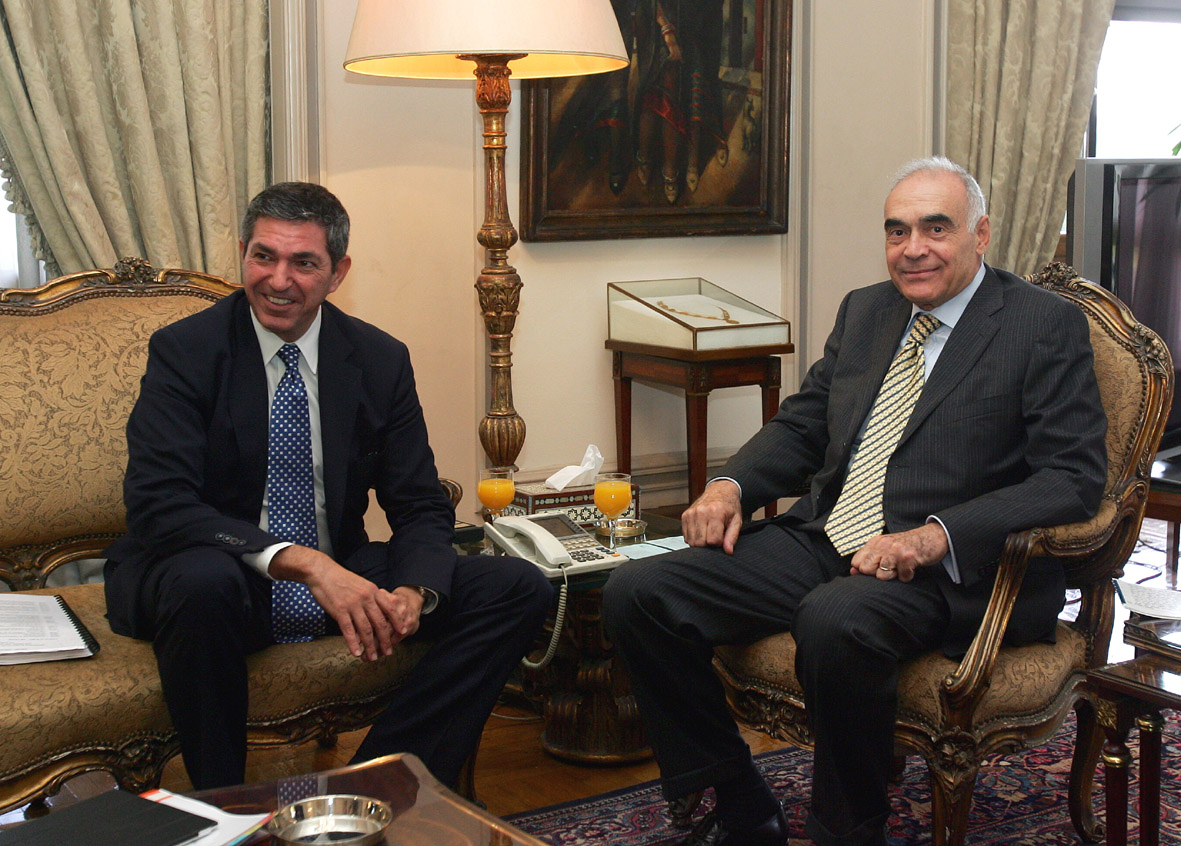
Greek foreign minister Lambrinidis with Egyptian foreign minister, Mohamed Kamel Amr during official 2011 visit to Cairo

Following a cabinet reshuffle on 17 June 2011 in Athens, the prime minister, George A. Papandreou, named Lambrinidis as the new minister for foreign affairs.

A month after assuming his new post, Lambrinidis signed a Cultural Memorandum of Understanding with the U.S. Secretary of State, Hillary Clinton, on import restrictions for archaeological finds in order to combat the illegal trade of Greek antiquities that have frequently turned up in foreign museums.

As Foreign Affairs Minister of the Hellenic Republic, Lambrinidis visited numerous European countries, to explain the effectiveness of the reforms taking place in Greece and the investment opportunities in the country. During his public engagements, he also made a number of proposals about the establishment of new international instruments to tackle economic inequalities, and to generate funds for economic development projects such as the financial transactions tax, and new political and economic governance instruments that would make the European Union more united, in order to be able to prevent and tackle more effectively future financial crises.

In September 2011, Lambrinidis represented Greece at the 66th General Assembly of the United Nations, while a few days later he was the keynote speaker in the World Leadership Forum, which is annually organized by the Foreign Policy Association.

Lambrinidis was succeeded by M.P. Stavros Dimas in November 2011, after an agreement between the parties that participated in the Coalition Government.

== European Union Roles ==
=== Special Representative for Human Rights ===
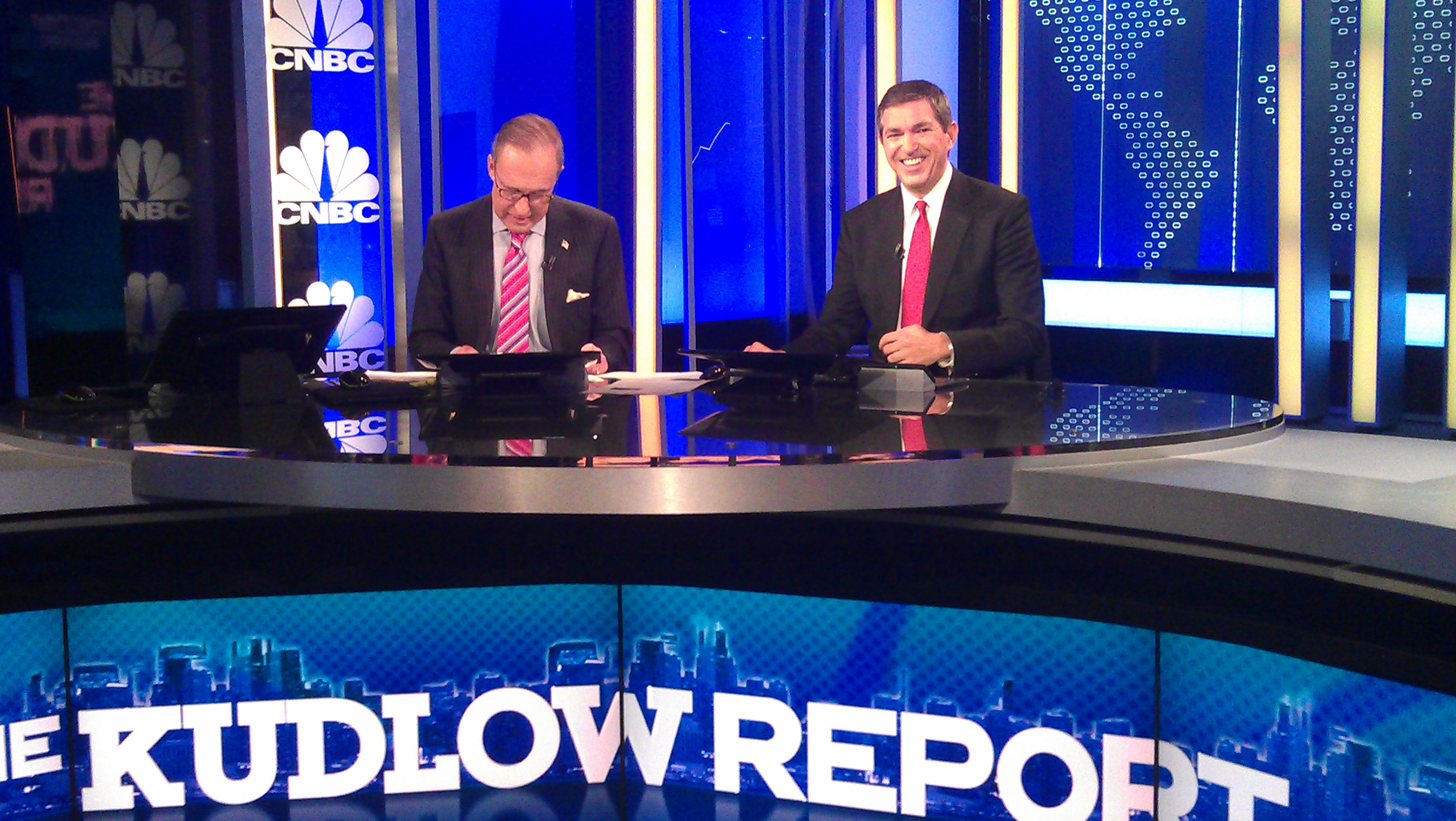
Stavros Lambrinidis interview at the Kudlow Report CNBC

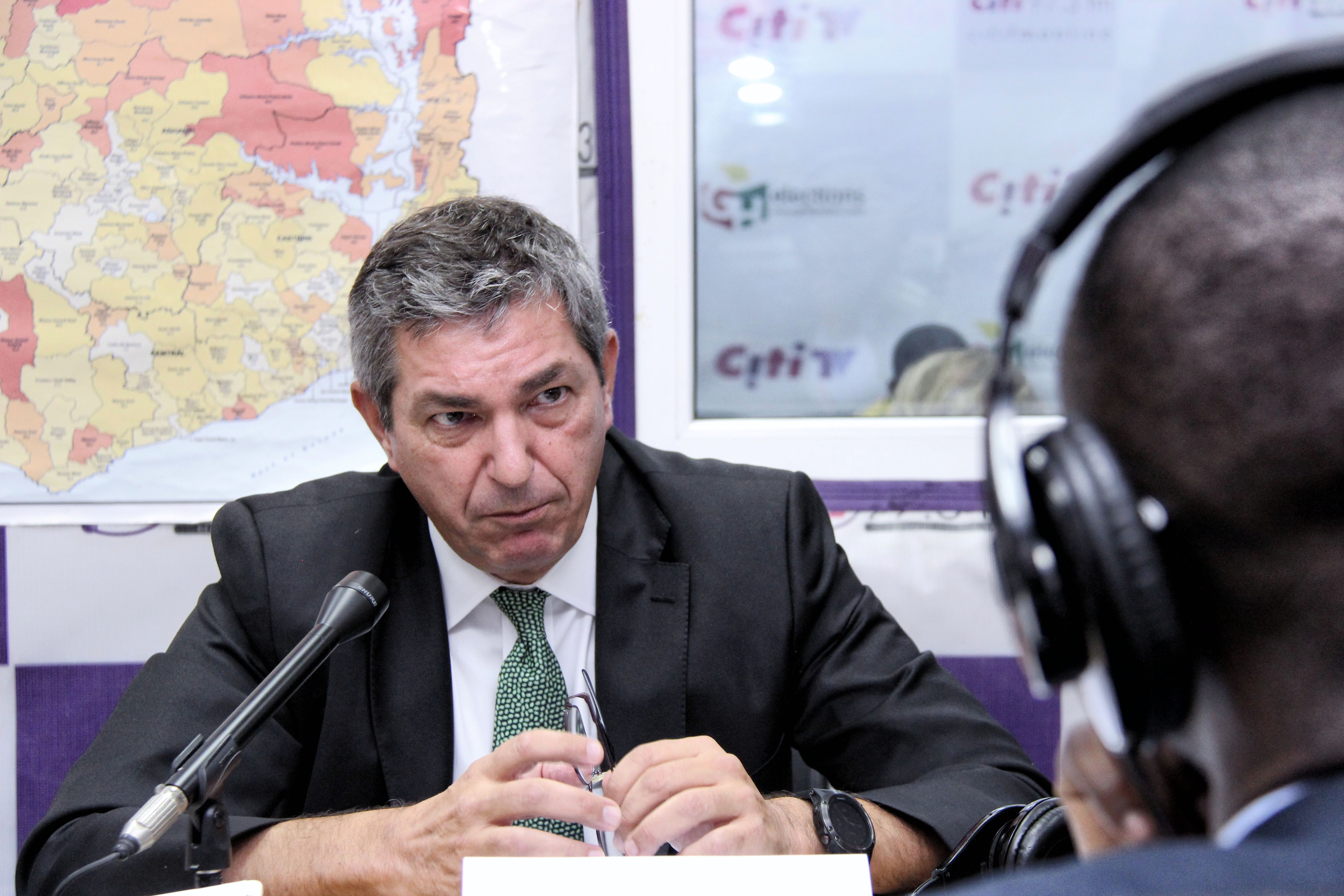
Stavros Lambrinidis in an interview at Citi FM during his visit to Ghana in July 2017 on human rights and democracy.

A long-standing request for a representative that would be in charge of enhancing the effectiveness and visibility of the E.U.'s Human Rights policy, based on the Strategic Framework and Action Plan on Human Rights and Democracy (officially adopted on 25 June 2012), led to the creation of the post of the Special Representative of the European Union for Human Rights. The post which is providing a strong, independent, flexible, and sufficiently broad mandate is aimed at increasing the European Union's effectiveness, coherence, and visibility in protecting and promoting human rights in the EU's foreign policy. It covers fields such as the strengthening of all Human rights, Democracy, International Justice, Humanitarian Law, anti-discrimination, and the abolition of the death penalty.

On 25 July 2012, the High Representative of the Union for Foreign Affairs and Security Policy, Baroness Ashton of Upholland, appointed Lambrinidis as the first European Union's Special Representative for Human Rights, with a renewable two years mandate.

During his mandate, Lambrinidis has paid official visits for meetings with governments and civil society in numerous countries around the world, including China, Cuba, Myanmar, Bahrain, Pakistan, Indonesia, Brazil, Mexico Morocco, South Africa, Azerbaijan, Russia, Norway, Belarus, the United States, and the United Nations in Geneva and New York. His work has been praised by European Union Foreign Affairs Ministers and the High Representative of the Union for Foreign Affairs and Security Policy Federica Mogherini.

=== EU Ambassador to the United States ===
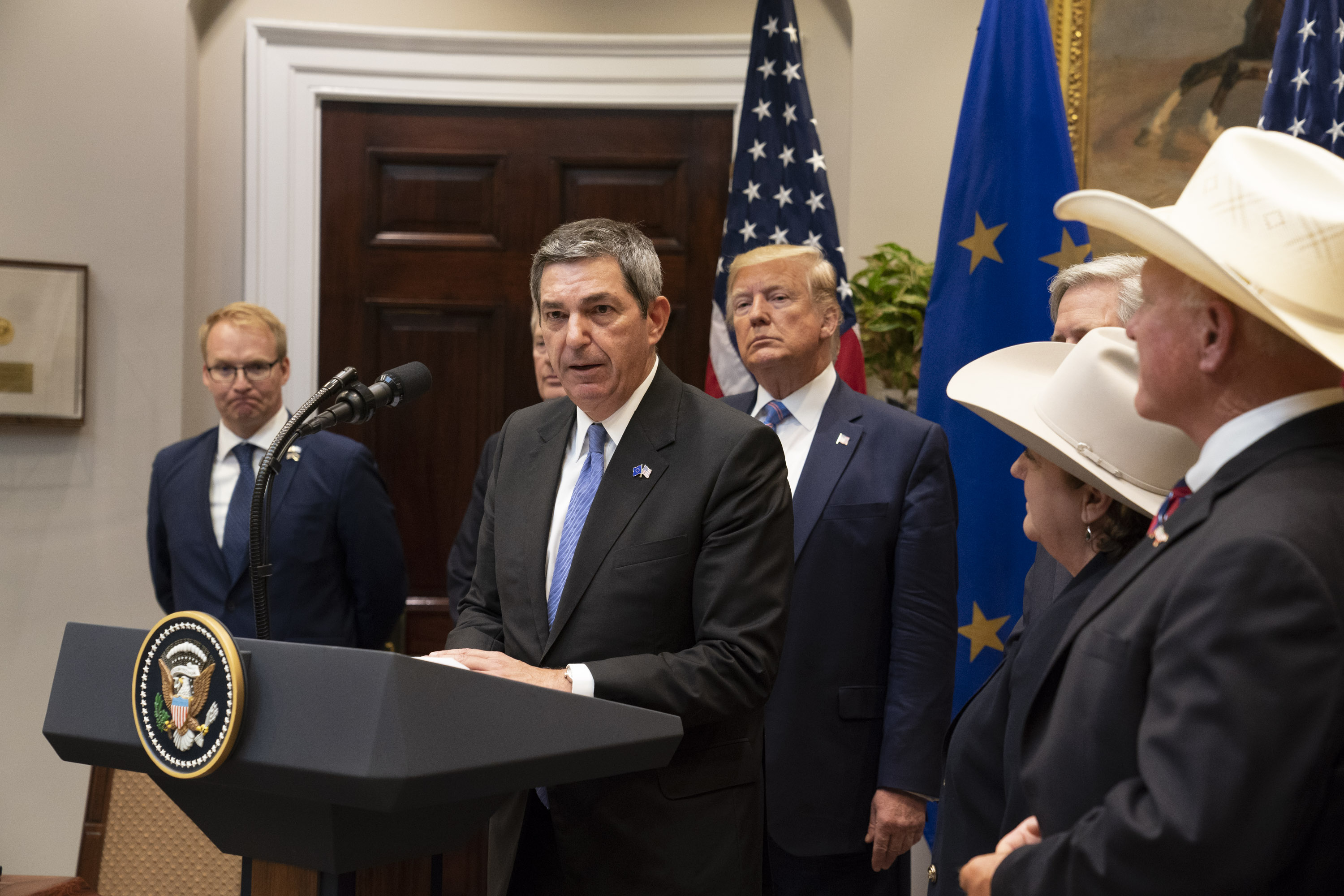
Lambrinidis speaks at the White House in 2019

On 4 March 2019, Lambrinidis assumed the post of EU ambassador to the United States. On the day of his ascension, the EU Delegation to the United States was raised in the U.S. Diplomatic Corps' Order of Precedence. The Trump administration had previously lowered the delegation's protocol status to that of international organisations, a tier below the highest level - usually reserved for countries. As a result, Lambrinidis per protocol held the rank equivalent of Ambassador Extraordinary and Plenipotentiary to the United States of America. His term as ambassador to the United States concluded on 31 December 2023, after having served during both the Trump and the Biden Administrations.

=== EU Ambassador to the United Nations ===
On 15 January 2024, Lambrinidis presented his letter of appointment to United Nations Secretary-General António Guterres and assumed the post of EU Ambassador to the organisation.

== Awards and distinctions ==
- Emeritus Professor at the Mariupol Institute of Humanities of the Donetsk National University in Donetsk Oblast, Ukraine
- Hellenic Leadership Conference, for his work in the promotion of Hellenic perspectives abroad
- M.E.P. Candidate of the Year 2006
- Former President of the District of Columbia Bar Association's Human Rights Committee
- Board Member of the American Bar Association's Trade Committee
- Editor of the A.B.A. International Trade Newsletter
- Champion of Freedom Award 2020, Electronic Privacy Information Center (EPIC)
- Global Visionary Award 2023, Institute for Education (IFE)
- Member of the Global Board, International Gender Champions
- Member of the President’s Council on International Activities, Yale University

== Publications ==
- "Integration of Immigrants into the E.U." - European Parliament's Reports
- "Promoting Security and Fundamental Rights in the Electronic Age" - European Parliament's Reports
- “The Positive Narrative on Human Rights” - The European Union’s New Foreign Policy, ed. Martin Westlake, Palgrave Macmillan Press 2020

== See also ==
- Cabinet of Greece
- European External Action Service
- List of Phi Beta Kappa Members
- List of Yale Law School Alumni

Political offices
| Preceded by Dimitrios Droutsas | Minister for Foreign Affairs; 2011 | Succeeded by Stavros Dimas |
Diplomatic posts
| New office | European Union Special Representative for Human Rights; 2012–present | Incumbent |
