= Alfons de Vreese =

Alfons De Vreese
- Born: 1909; Belgium
- Died: 1994 (aged 85); Ghent, Belgium
- Occupations: Magistrate, professor, international judge
- Known for: Counsellor and Section President at the Belgian Court of Cassation (1961–1979) President of the International Association of Judges (1974–1976) Early professor of European law at the College of Europe

Alfons de Vreese (1909 – 1994) was a Belgian magistrate, international judicial figure, and academic.

== Professional activities ==
He began his judicial career at age 27, serving as a magistrate. A member of the Belgian Court of Cassation from 1961 to 1979, he eventually served as Section President (Afdelingsvoorzitter). He belonged to the first generation of judges at the Benelux Court of Justice and contributed to establishing a fully recognised Dutch-language jurisprudence at Belgium's highest court.

De Vreese was one of the earliest law professors at the College of Europe in Bruges. From the institution's inaugural academic year (1949–1950) he taught comparative law and public international law, later shifting to the emerging field of European Community law.

Internationally, he served as the first vice-president (1972) and subsequently President of the International Association of Judges (IAJ) from 1974 to 1976. During his presidency – after having personally traveled to New York in 1977 to advocate for it despite opposition – he successfully obtained consultative status for the IAJ at the United Nations Economic and Social Council (ECOSOC).

Active in Flemish legal circles, he was a founding vice-chairman (1964) and later Honorary Vice-chairman of the Vlaamse Juristenvereniging and co-authored its 1966 manifesto on contemporary legal structures in the context of Flemish emancipation. From 1963 to 1979 he was an editorial board member of the journal Sociaal-Economische Wetgeving (SEW).

== Personal life ==
De Vreese was multilingual (fluent in Italian), traveler (winning an interuniversity travel scholarship as a young jurist), and had interests in literature, the Italian Renaissance, and humanism.

De Vreese died in Ghent one day after his 85th birthday in 1994.
