= Gouden Hand =

Canal in Bruges, Belgium

Coordinates: 51.2134°N 3.2269°E

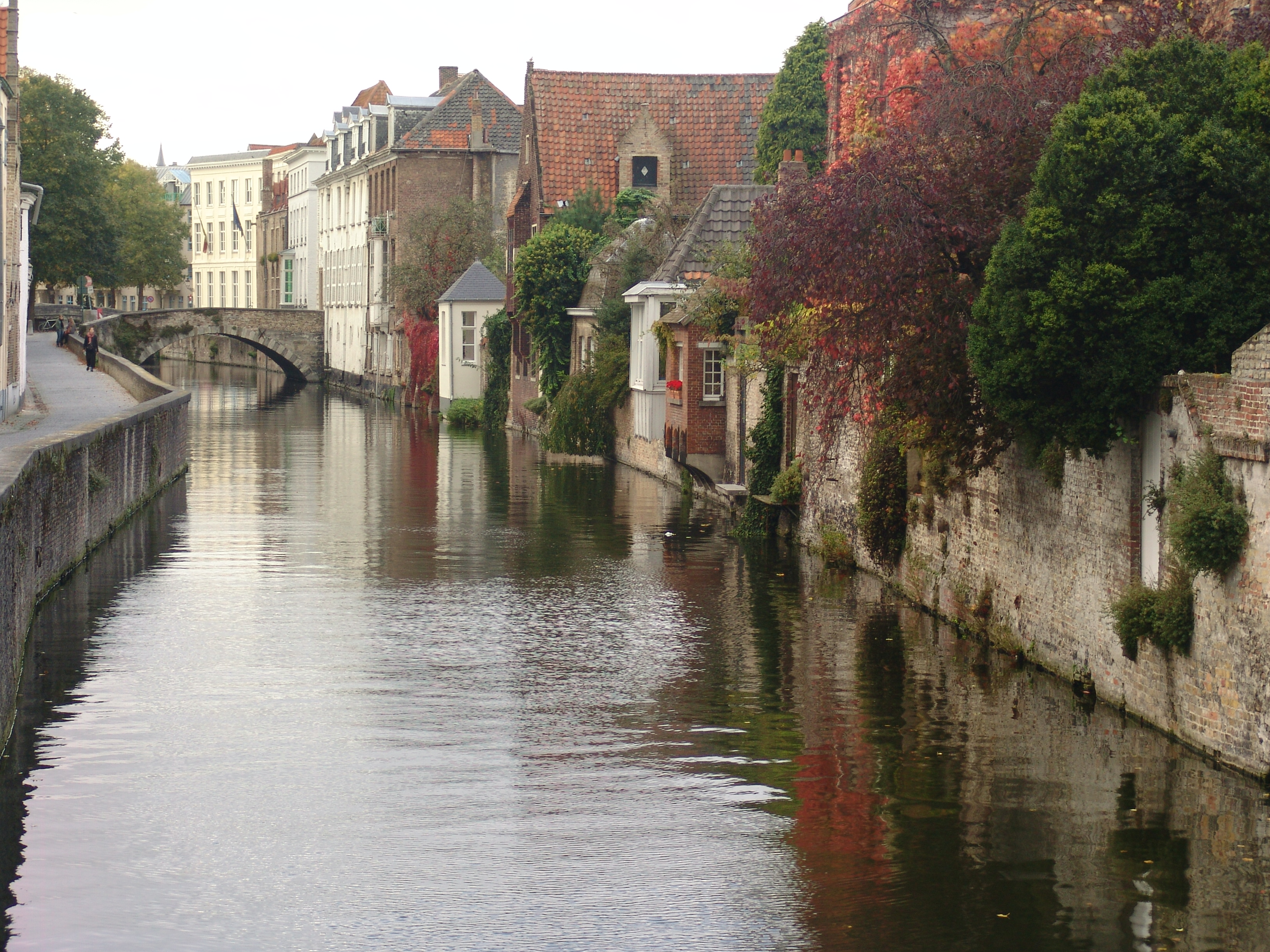
Torenbrug over Goudenhand canal in Bruges, Belgium

Gouden Hand (the two words sometimes written together, as Goudenhand, and meaning "Golden Hand") is a canal in Bruges, Belgium.

Goudenhand is also the name of two streets along the same canal. These are, Goudenhandrei immediately along the canal ("rei" being the name given to Bruges' canals) and Goudenhandstraat along the opposite side in a line parallel but not contiguous to the canal. Whereas Goudenhand Building is the name of a 17th-century building situated along the canal's bank next to one of its bridges.

Goudenhand building is used by the College of Europe for student accommodation since 1985 after its acquisition and renovation by the college.

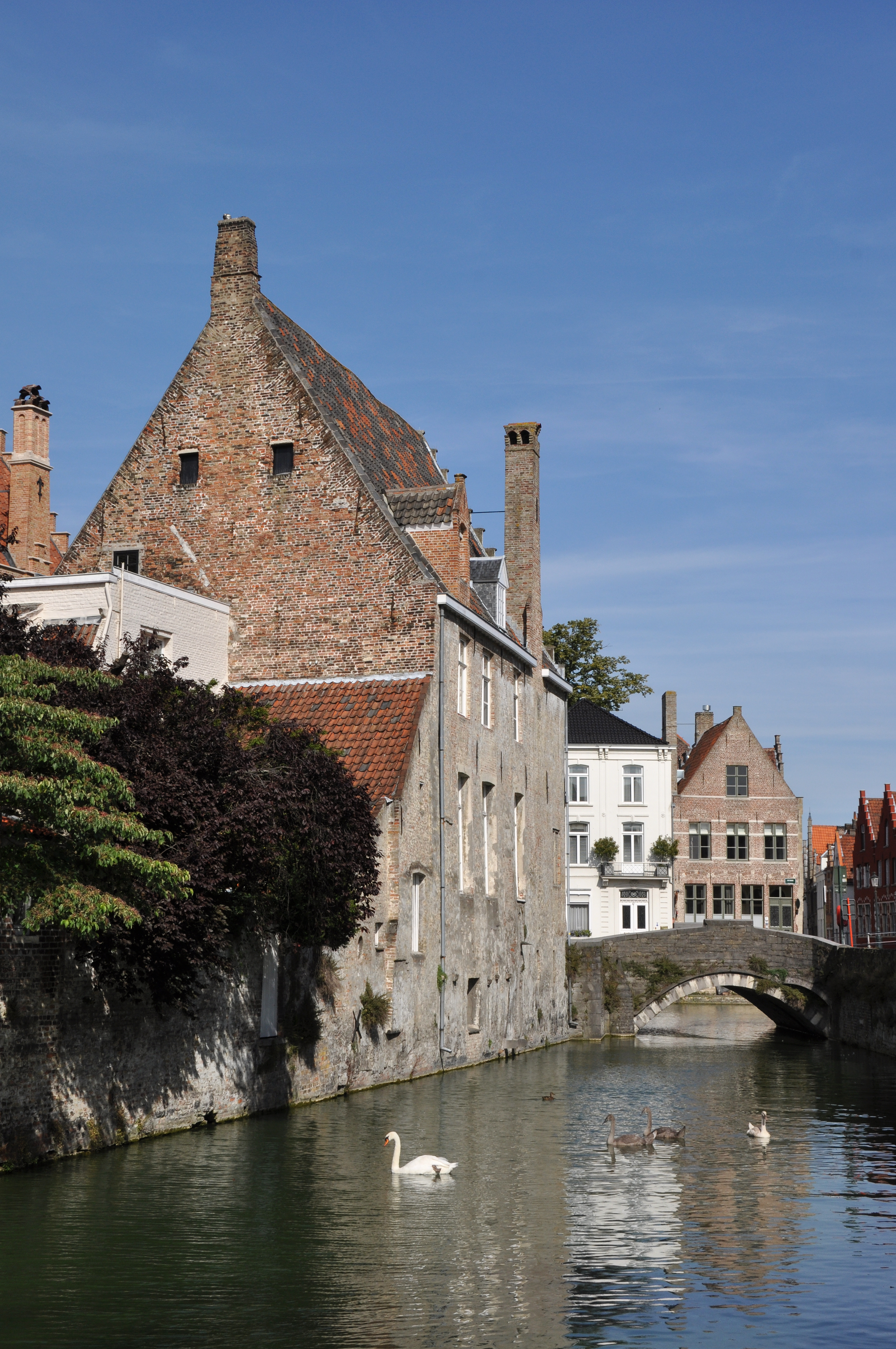
View of Goudenhand canal
