= College of Europe =

International relations school based in Belgium, Poland & Albania

- Collège d'Europe; Europacollege; Kolegium Europy; Kolegji i Evropës
- Type: Private postgraduate institute Établissement d'utilité publique
- Established: 1949
- Budget: €30.7 million (2026)
- Chair: Herman Van Rompuy
- Rector: João Gomes Cravinho
- Vice-Rector: Ewa Ośniecka-Tamecka
- Academic staff: 300+
- Postgraduates: Annually ca. 500 students from over 55 countries
- Location: Bruges, Belgium; Warsaw, Poland; Tirana, Albania
- Working languages: English and French
- Website: www.coleurope.eu

The College of Europe (French: Collège d'Europe; Dutch: Europacollege; Polish: Kolegium Europy; Albanian: Kolegji i Evropës) is a post-graduate institute of European studies with three campuses in Bruges, Belgium; Warsaw, Poland; and Tirana, Albania.

The College of Europe in Bruges was founded in 1949 as a result of the 1948 Congress of Europe in The Hague by leading historical European figures and founding fathers of the European Union, including Salvador de Madariaga, Winston Churchill, Paul-Henri Spaak and Alcide De Gasperi, to promote "a spirit of solidarity and mutual understanding between all the nations of Western Europe and to provide elite training to individuals who will uphold these values" and "to train an elite of young executives for Europe". After the fall of communism, the College opened an additional campus in Natolin, Poland, that was donated to the institution by the Polish government in 1992. A campus in the Albanian capital Tirana opened in 2024.

The College of Europe is historically linked to the establishment of the European Union and its predecessors, and to the creation of the European Movement International, of which the College is a supporting member. João Gomes Cravinho, former Foreign Minister of Portugal, was appointed as the Rector in 2026; former President of the European Council, Herman Van Rompuy, is chair of the board.

The Financial Times writes that "the elite College of Europe in Bruges" is "an institution geared to producing crop after crop of graduates with a lifelong enthusiasm for EU integration", while the BBC called it "the EU's very own Oxbridge", and The New York Times described it as "school of the EU elite". Each academic year, referred to as promotion, is named after a patron, and opened by a leading European politician.

It has the status of Institution of Public Interest, operating according to Belgian law.

== History ==
=== Hague Congress initiative to create a College of Europe ===
The College of Europe was the world's first university institute of postgraduate studies and training in European affairs. It was founded in 1949 by leading European figures, such as Salvador de Madariaga, Winston Churchill, Paul-Henri Spaak and Alcide De Gasperi, in the wake of the Hague Congress of 1948, that led to the creation of the European Movement. At the Congress, the Spanish statesman Salvador de Madariaga strongly advocated for the creation of a College of Europe, where graduates from different European states could study together as a way to heal the wounds of the World War II. Although the cultural resolution adopted at the end of the Congress did not include explicit references to the establishment of a College of Europe and only advocated for the creation of a "European Cultural Centre and a European Institute for Childhood and Youth Questions", the idea of establishing a European University was put forward by Congress attendees immediately after the Congress.

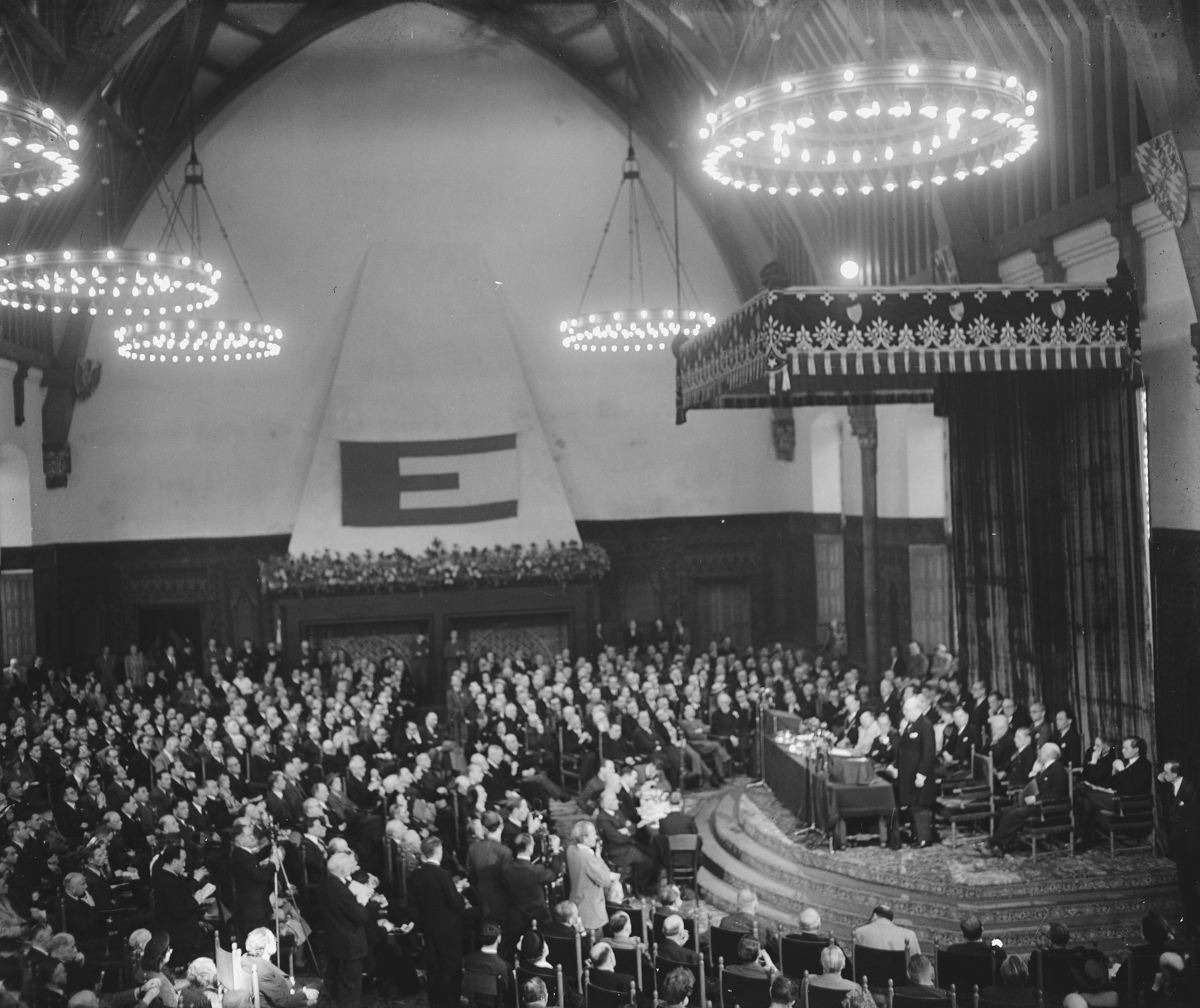
The Hague Congress (1948)

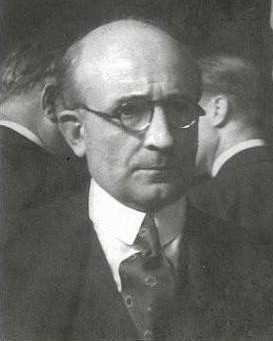
Salvador de Madariaga

A group of Bruges citizens led by the Reverend Karel Verleye succeeded in attracting the College to Bruges. Professor Hendrik Brugmans, one of the intellectual leaders of the European Movement and the president of the Union of European Federalists, became its first Rector (1950–1972). John Bowie, Professor of Modern History at Oxford University, was appointed director of the first session held by the College, in 1949. Henri van Effenterre, who was a Professor of Ancient History at Caen University and Alphonse de Vreese, International Law professor at the University of Ghent, also contributed to that first session. The topic of that first session taught to the first promotion of the College (frequently called préparatoire, for it is the only promotion not named after any prominent figure) was "Teaching history and the development of a European spirit in universities".

In 1978, Guy Spitaels, at that time Belgian Minister for the Employment, was the first College alumnus to be invited as the Orateur of the opening ceremony of an academic year.

In the decades that followed the establishment of the institution, students were hosted at the Navarra Hotel in the historic centre of Bruges until 1981. The College consolidated itself as an institution specialized in studies focused on the newly established European Communities (the College was founded in 1949, before the communities were established).

=== Bruges speech by Margaret Thatcher ===
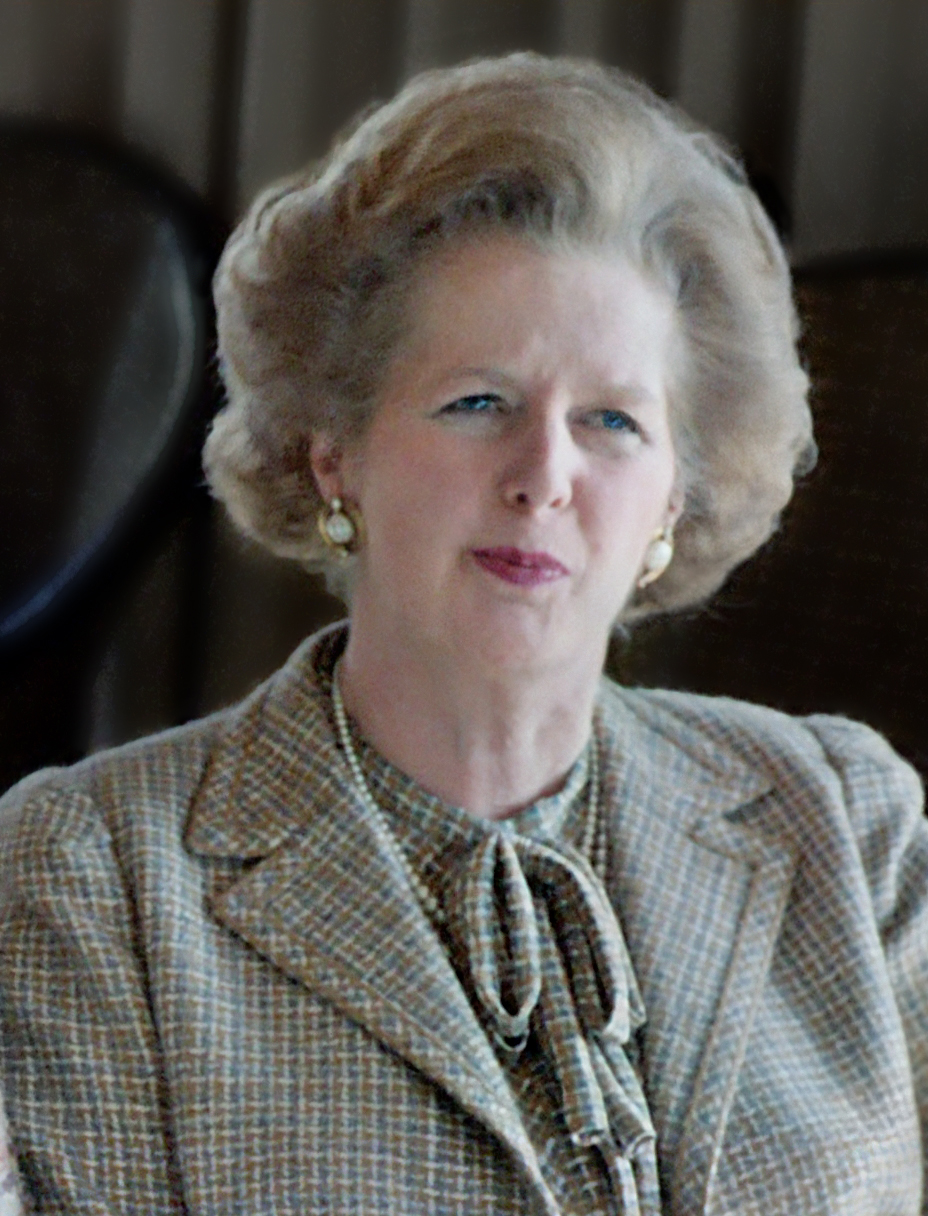
Margaret Thatcher

In 1988, British Prime Minister Margaret Thatcher delivered a speech that became known as the Bruges speech at the College of Europe as part of the opening ceremony for that academic year. The Bruges speech is considered by observers as the cornerstone of the Eurosceptic movement that eventually led to Brexit. Thatcher laid down her vision for Europe, claiming that the European Community should remain an economic union, refusing the claims for a closer political integration made by Commission President Jacques Delors. Thatcher outlined her opposition to any attempts to create "a European superstate exercising a new dominance from Brussels."

=== Post-Cold War history ===
After the fall of communism and changes in Central and Eastern Europe, the College of Europe campus at Natolin (Warsaw, Poland), was founded in 1992 with the support of the European Commission and the Polish government. According to former president of the European Commission Jacques Delors, "this College of Europe at Natolin is more than the symbol of Europe found once again, it is the hope represented in this beautiful historic place. The hope that exchanges can multiply for greater mutual understanding and fraternity". The establishment of a second campus in eastern has been frequently regarded as part of an effort aiming to train young students from eastern countries under the auspices of eastern enlargement. Since the establishment of that second campus in Poland, the College operates as "one College – two campuses," and what was once referred to as the "esprit de Bruges", is now known as the "esprit du Collège".

In 2012, the College of Europe became a supporting member of the European Movement International. In 2015, former Finnish Prime Minister Alexander Stubb was the second College alumnus to be invited as the Orateur of the opening ceremony of an academic year. The academic year 2018–2019 marked the first time in which a promotion was named after a College alumnus, Manuel Marín, Spanish statesman, European Commissioner and acting President of the Commission (known as "Father of the Erasmus Programme"), who had died early that year.

== Campuses ==
=== Bruges campus ===
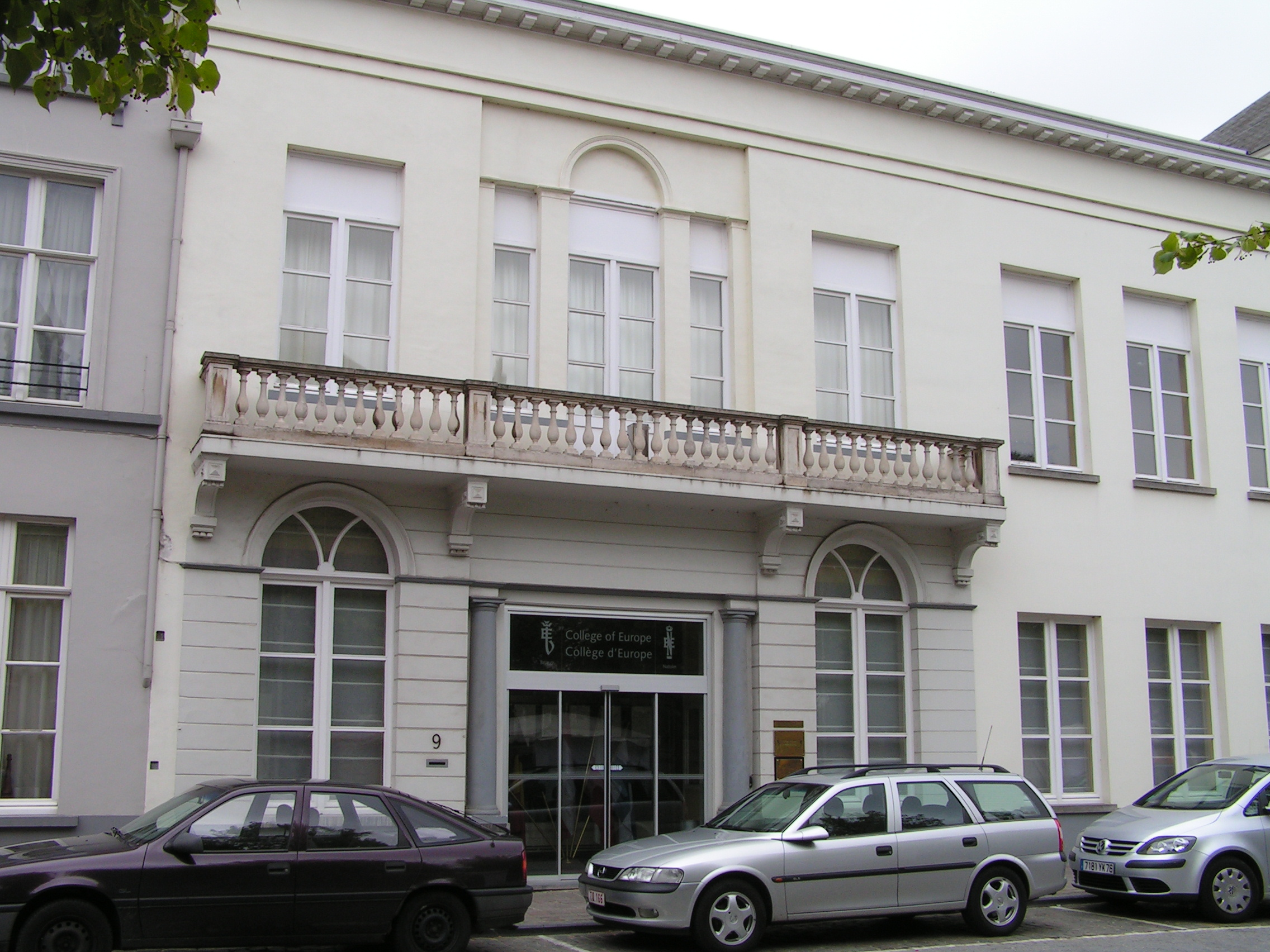
Paul Henri Spaak Building

The Bruges campus is situated in the centre of Bruges since its establishment in 1949. Bruges is located in the Flemish Region of Belgium, a Dutch-speaking area, although the College does not use Dutch as one of its working languages.

The College has a system of residences in the centre of Bruges and not far from the Dijver, where the main administrative and academic building and the library are situated. None of the residences lodges more than 60 students so that each residence in fact has its own small multinational and multicultural environment.

It consists of the following campus buildings:

==== Dijver ====
The Paul Henri Spaak Building (named after the Belgian socialist prime minister and pioneer of European integration, nicknamed "Mr. Europe"), popularly known as Dijver, is the College's main administrative building on the Bruges campus. It hosts the College's main reception, some of its offices, classrooms and the library. It is located on the Dijver Canal. A white classic façade stands at the front of the main building (where the European, Belgian, Flemish and Brugeois flags hang together), while there is a garden in its back side. The garden is used by the students, who frequently spare their break time there due to its proximity to the library (which is connected to the main building by a corridor). Signed portraits of all the orateurs hang in the walls of the main corridor of the building.

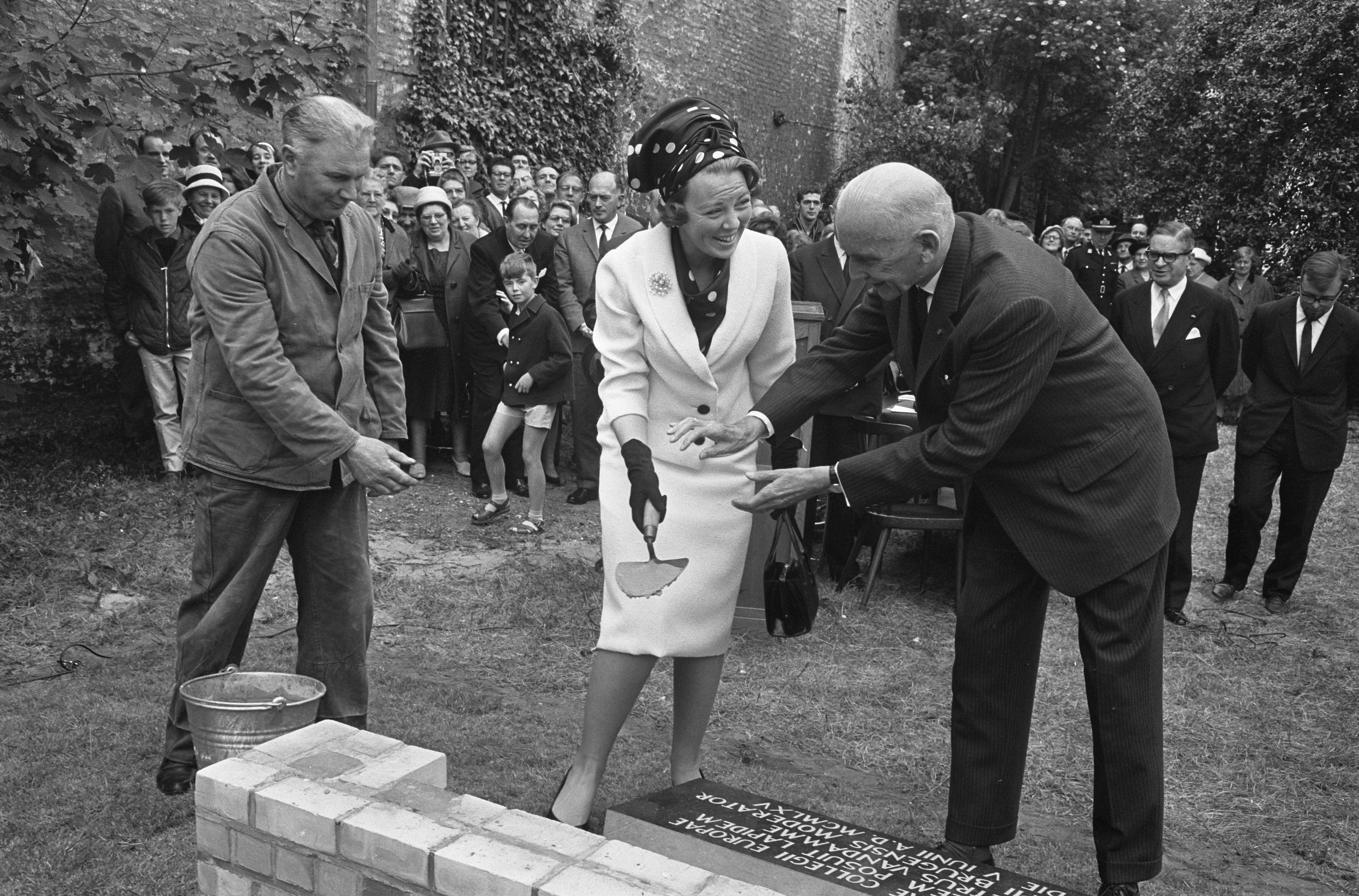
Princess Beatrix of the Netherlands laying down the first stone of the library in 1965

The library building was built in 1965. Princess Beatrix of the Netherlands (later Queen Beatrix) laid the first stone of the library in a special commemorative event. Almost three decades after its completion, the library was reformed and enlarged (the works were completed in 1992). Most of the library funds are devoted to European Studies, together with law, economics, and political and administrative sciences. Access to the library is restricted to College students and academic staff. A bust of Salvador de Madariaga presides over the library main reading hall.

==== Verversdijk ====
Following the increase in the number of students attending the College each year, the College of Europe (with the support of different entities and institutions, including the Flemish Government and the City of Bruges) reformed the 17th century protected monument of Verversdijk to provide additional lecture theatres (auditoria), teaching rooms and offices for academics, research fellows and staff; and to extend its activities. The reform was led by the office of Xaveer De Geyter Architects (XDGA), and the project was nominated for the Mies van de Rohe award in 2009. The Verversdijk premises began to be used by College students in 2007. Besides its academic and administrative use throughout the course, a cocktail is served in its garden to each promotion, following their graduation ceremony.

The historical site of Verversdijk owes its name to fact that the owners of the houses standing there at medieval times were dyers who used wool traded with Scotland, as the area was populated by several Englishmen during the Middle Ages. During the Spanish rule, it hosted the schooling houses and the monastery established by the Jesuits in the 17th century. In 1792, the monastery auditorium was used as a meeting place by the Jacobin Club. The main monastery wing (dating back to 1701, and whose façade was plastered in 1865) was built along the canal, and was used as an athenaeum since 1851. its long inner corridor is an outstanding example of the rococo style in Bruges, whereas, the ashlar staircase is also an element of artistic relevance. The attic of the building, with a total length of 45 meters and a surprisingly well-preserved oak canopy, is currently used as a study room. During the First World War occupation of Belgium, the attic was used as a sleeping room for soldiers of the German Marine.

The monastery wing was also home to the Museum of Modern Painting from 1898 to 1931 (when they were transferred to the newly established Groeninge Museum). Since 2008, following and agreement between the College and the Groeninge Museum, the College hosts the 'Extraordinary Groeninghe Art Collection', an installation of contemporary works of art featuring international artists at Verversdijk's hallways. Members of the Groeninghe Art Collection meet every two months at the College to discuss art, attend lectures by art experts and consider possible purchases.

In March 2014, the so-called China Library was established at the Verversdijk compound. A project sponsored by the Information Office of the State Council of the Chinese Government, the library (decorated in Chinese style) is home to ten thousand books and documents in more than six languages, as frequently hosts events related with Sino-European relations or the Chinese culture.

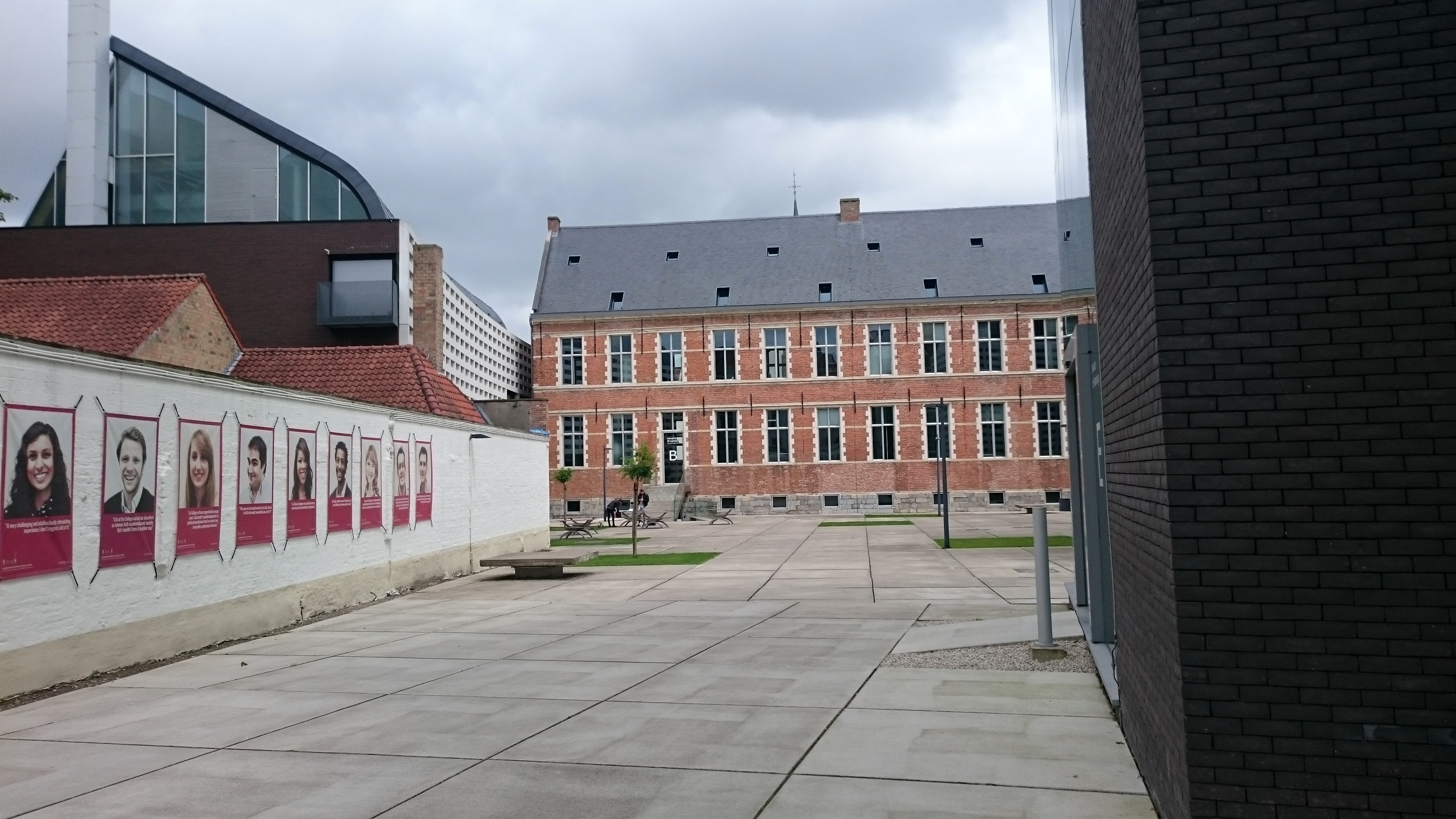
View of Verversdijk Campus

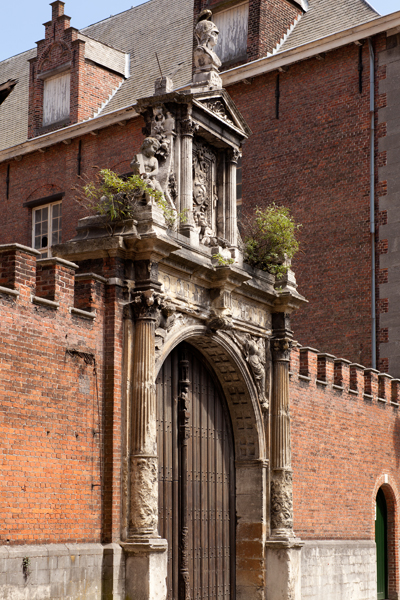
Old entrance to the Verversdijk buildings

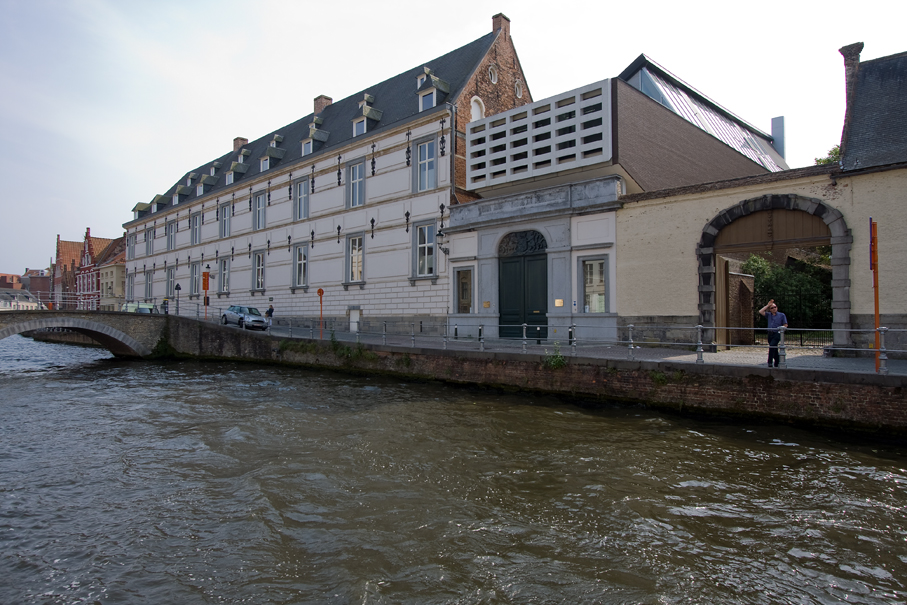
New entrance to the Verversdijk buildings

==== Garenmarkt ====
The Hotel Portinari in Garenmarkt 15 with its classical façade was formerly home to Tommaso Portinari, the administrator of the Florentine "Loggia de Medici" in the 15th century in Bruges. It contains eleven apartments for professors and forty student rooms, two "salons" in 19th-century style, the "salon du Recteur" with 18th-century wall paintings and a modern "Mensa" for students. A room dedicated to Winston Churchill (who was among the voices calling for the establishment of the College during The Hague Congress in 1948 and was one of its founders the year after) was inaugurated by his grandson, Sir Nicholas Soames, and the British ambassador in 2017. Garenmarkt also hosts the canteen for all College students.

==== Biskajer ====
The residence is located in a home built in classicist style during the 19th century. The building is located in Biskajersplein, a small square named after the Spanish region of Biscay (the square is located on the side the dock where ships coming in from that region unloaded their merchandise in the 15th and 16th centuries). The actual residence is located on the lot occupied by the Mareminne house, which hosted the consulate of Biscay in the past, although the original building was demolished. Traces of the old consulate building can be found in the inner garden of the residence, which kept the shape of the consulate's horse stable. The residence hosts 53 students every year.

==== Gouden Hand ====
The Gouden Hand residence is housed in a Bruges-style building dating back to the 17th century. It is a listed monument. It was renovated during the 2005–2006 academic year. The name of the residence, directly translates from Dutch to "Golden Hand", after a medieval legend about the canal bordering the residence. Gouden Hand is also the name of two streets along the same canal. The 15th century painter Jan Van Eyck lived and owned a studio in the Gouden-Handstraat nr. 6, behind the current residence.

The Gouden Hand student bar is situated in the cellar. The building has been a backdrop for many films and documentaries.

=== Natolin campus ===
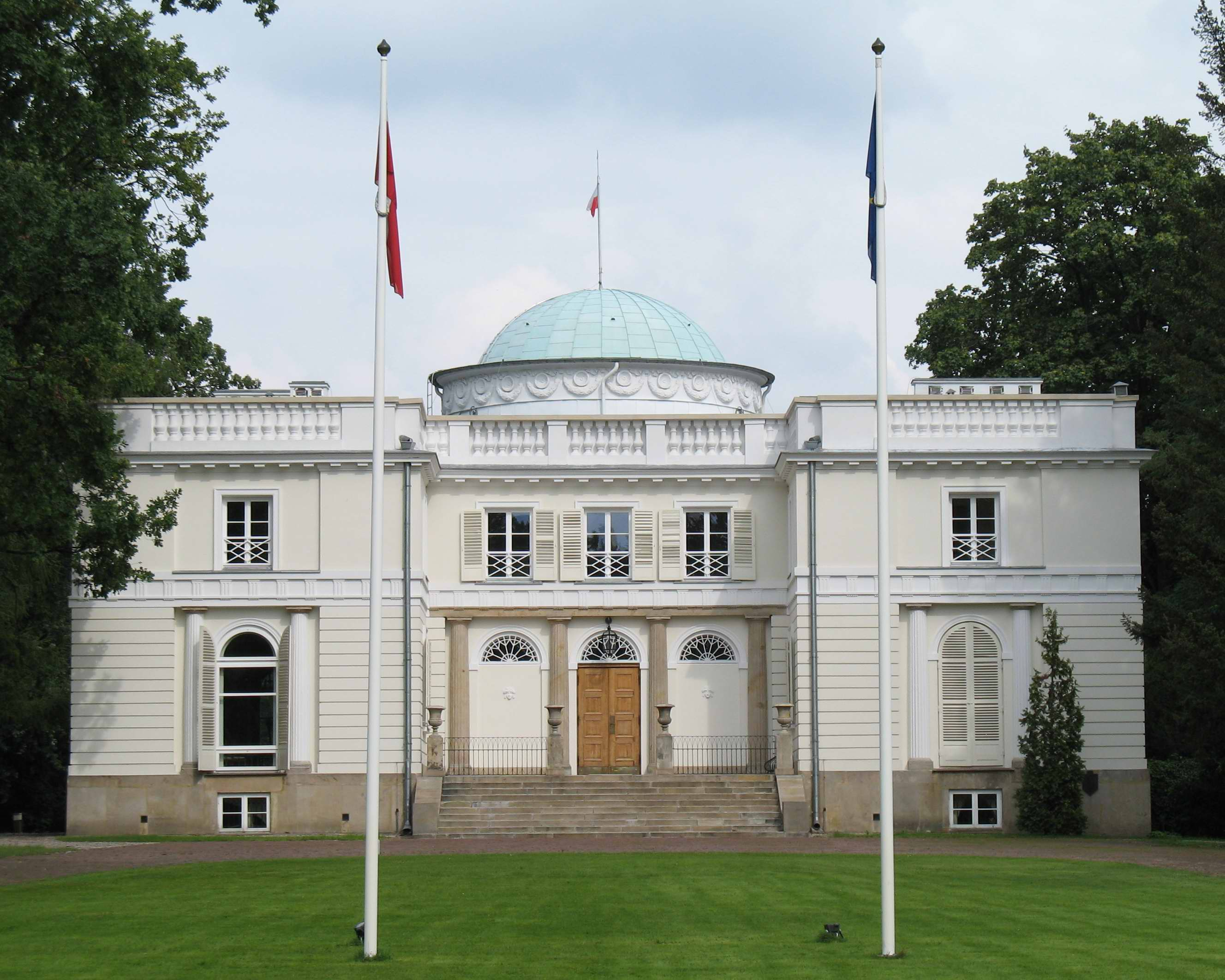
Potocki Palace in Natolin

The Natolin Warsaw campus of the College was established in 1992 responding to the revolutions of 1989 and ahead of Poland's accession negotiations with the EU.

The Natolin Campus is located in a historic palace, part of a 120-hectare park and nature reserve—formerly the Royal hunting palace of Natolin—situated in the southern part of Warsaw about 20 minutes by metro from the city centre. The Natolin European Centre Foundation takes care of the complex and has conducted restoration of the former Potocki palace, making it available for the College.

The old historical buildings, including the manor house, the stables and the coach house, were converted to the needs of modern times and new buildings were constructed in a style preserving the harmony of the palace and its outlying estate.

In 2022, the Natolin campus of the College of Europe hosted one of the four European citizens' panels, organised as part of the EU's Conference on the Future of Europe.

=== Tirana Campus ===
In 2023, the College announced the opening of a new campus in Tirana, the capital of Albania. The Tirana campus of the College of Europe welcomed its inaugural cohort during the 2024–2025 academic year, comprising 32 students from 21 countries. The student body primarily included individuals from the Western Balkans and the European Union. The College has indicated an expected increase in student enrollment in the future. During the 2025–2026 academic year 40 students with 24 different nationalities were studying in Tirana.

== Organisation ==
=== Faculty ===
Originally, the College had no permanent teaching staff. Instead, the courses were taught by prominent academics and sometimes government officials from around Europe. While the College teaching is still mostly based on a flying faculty system, in the last couple of decades the institution has increasingly employed permanent academic staff, including directors of studies, permanent professors, and chairholders. Overall, more than 300 professors taught at the College in 2024.

=== Governance ===
==== Rectors ====
The rector directs and coordinates the College's activities.

- Hendrik Brugmans (1949–1971)
- Jerzy Łukaszewski (1972–1990)
- Werner Ungerer (1990–1993)
- Gabriel Fragnière (1993–1995)
- Otto von der Gablentz (1996–2001)
- Piet Akkermans (2001–2002)
- Robert Picht (a.i., 2002–2003)
- Paul Demaret (2003–2013)
- Jörg Monar (2013–2020)
- Federica Mogherini (2020–2025)
- Ewa Ośniecka-Tamecka (a.i., 2025–2026)
- João Gomes Cravinho (2026-present)

==== Vice-rectors ====
The vice-rector is responsible for the day-to-day administration of the Natolin (Warsaw) campus.

- Ettore Deodato (1993)
- David W. P. Lewis (1994–1996)
- Jacek Saryusz-Wolski (1996–1999)
- Piotr Nowina-Konopka (1999–2004)
- Robert Picht (a.i. 2004–2005)
- Robert Picht (2005–2007)
- Ewa Ośniecka-Tamecka (2007– present)

==== Presidents of the Administrative Council ====
The President of the Administrative Council of the College of Europe chairs its highest decision-making authority, and is responsible for the implementation of the College's objectives. The Council includes representatives of the European Commission, of the two countries hosting campuses in Bruges, Belgium and Natolin, Poland and of other European governments. The Executive Committee of the College, reporting to the Administrative Council, ensures the sound financial and administrative working of the College.

- Salvador de Madariaga (1950–1964)
- Jean Rey (1964–1974)
- François-Xavier Ortoli (1974–1975)
- Daniël Coens (1985–1990)
- Manuel Marín (1990–1995)
- Jacques Delors (1995–2000)
- Jean-Luc Dehaene (2000–2009)
- Íñigo Méndez de Vigo (2009 – 2019)
- Herman Van Rompuy (2019–present)

=== Finances ===
The College’s finances are structured separately between the Bruges and Tirana campuses on the one hand, and the Natolin campus on the other. Its total budget amounted to approximately €30.7 million in 2026. The institution is primarily funded through public sources, including annual operating grants from the European Commission under the Erasmus+ programme, as well as contributions from the governments of the host countries, namely Belgium, Poland, and Albania. For the 2026 financial year, the European Commission awarded an operating grant of approximately €10.2 million to the Bruges and Tirana campuses, while the Natolin campus was co-financed with about €5.0 million.

For the 2026–2027 academic year, the annual fee covering tuition, accommodation and meals is €30,000 at the Bruges campus, €29,000 in Natolin, and €27,000 in Tirana. Around 70% of students receive full or partial scholarships that are mostly funded by national and regional governments. Additional scholarships are provided through contributions from alumni, foundations, and private sponsors.

== Academics ==
=== Admissions ===
Every year, more than 2.000 people from over 100 countries apply to the College. Application may be made to national selection committees or by direct application to the College of Europe for individuals from a country where no selection committee exists. As of 2026, there are 32 national and regional selection committees. Selection committees can grant scholarships. Approximately 70% of students receive a scholarship from either national governments or other public and private institutions. For much of its history, the College only admitted few students, but the number has steadily increased since the 1990s.

=== Education ===
The College of Europe is a bilingual institution, requiring students to be proficient in both English and French. In fact, students typically speak three to four languages.

It offers several one-year advanced master's programmes in various fields related to European studies. At the Bruges campus, students can choose from four specialized master's programmes: European Political and Governance Studies, European Law, European Economic Studies, and EU International Relations and Diplomacy Studies. The Natolin campus offers a single programme: European Interdisciplinary Studies. At the Tirana campus, students are offered a programme in European Transformation and Integration. Additionally, in collaboration with the Fletcher School of Law and Diplomacy at Tufts University, the College offers a joint Master in Transatlantic Affairs, in which students spend one year at each institution.

=== Libraries ===
The College libraries mainly focus on European integration, EU law, economics, political science, international relations, and related fields. Together, their holdings include around 115,000 printed volumes, over 600,000 e-books, 5,000 theses, nearly 200 journal titles, and more than 30 databases.

== Student life ==
=== Residences ===
Depending on the location, students are either accommodated in multiple residences, like in Bruges, or in a self-contained residential campus, like in Warsaw and Tirana. Within those, students are assigned individual private rooms and have access to shared spaces. Residences are overseen by administrative staff. Elected resident representatives serve as intermediary between residents and the administration. A campus canteen provides full-board meals throughout the week.

=== Societies ===
Student societies organise study visits, conferences, debates, cultural events, and social gatherings, related to different cultural, academic, professional, and social fields. Additionally, artistic groups like music ensembles and choirs have been established. Inter-campus sporting activities, like football and volleyball matches, also take place. Since 2010, during the annual Hendrik Brugmans Memorial Football Cup, named after the first rector of the College, teams of students of the current promotion as well as alumni compete against each other.

=== Traditions ===
The College of Europe has developed several traditions: Each cohort referred to as a "promotion" is named after an outstanding European figure, which is called "patron". Furthermore, each academic year is traditionally inaugurated by a prominent European person. During the formal opening and closing ceremony of every academic year the College's student choir sings the European Anthem Ode to Joy, usually in multiple languages.

Another tradition dating back to the first years of existence of the College is the visit to Flanders fields of World War I during the first weeks of the academic year. During that visit, students lay a floral tribute at the Menin Gate war memorial in Ypres.

Since its early years, the College has had national days and weeks as part of its traditions: During these events, students organize cultural activities, academic conferences, traditional meals, and social gatherings to show the diversity of their national heritages.

Each year, College of Europe students are named honorary citizens of Bruges prior to their departure.

== Promotions ==
Academic years at the College are known as promotions. Each promotion is named after an outstanding European, referred to as the promotion's patron. The opening ceremony each year is presided over by a prominent European politician, referred to as the Orateur. Being invited as the College's Orateur is considered a high honour.

List of promotions
Year	Name of Promotion (Patron/ne)	Students	Speaker at Opening Ceremony (Orateur)	Speaker / Guest of Honor at Closing Ceremony
2026-2027	Johannes Gutenberg	tbd	Alexander Stubb (Bruges), António Costa (Natolin)	tbd
2025-2026	Victoria Amelina	ca. 500	Kaja Kallas (Bruges) & Ewa Ośniecka-Tamecka (Natolin) & Edi Rama (Tirana)	Ewa Ośniecka-Tamecka (Bruges) & Simon Bojsen-Møller (Natolin), François Hollande (Tirana)
2024-2025	Jacques Delors	494	Ursula von der Leyen (Bruges, Tirana) & Luc Frieden (Natolin)	Felipe VI (Bruges) & Federica Mogherini, Lt Roman Zagorodniy (Natolin) & Glenn Micallef, Ogerta Manastirliu (Tirana)
2023-2024	Madeleine Albright	460	Petr Pavel (Bruges) & Ewa Ośniecka-Tamecka (Natolin)	Frank-Walter Steinmeier (Bruges) & Ewa Ośniecka-Tamecka (Natolin)
2022-2023	David Sassoli	472	Roberta Metsola (Bruges) & Stevo Pendarovski (Natolin)	Sigrid Kaag (Bruges) & Rafał Trzaskowski (Natolin)
2021-2022	Éliane Vogel-Polsky	472	Alexander De Croo (Bruges) & Olha Stefanishyna (Natolin)	Marija Pejčinović Burić (Bruges) & Olha Stefanishyna (Natolin)
2020-2021	Mário Soares	479	Marcelo Rebelo de Sousa (Bruges) & Sviatlana Tsikhanouskaya (Natolin)	António Costa, Maroš Šefčovič (Bruges) & Ewa Ośniecka-Tamecka (Natolin)
2019-2020	Hannah Arendt	471	Donald Tusk (Bruges) & Ewa Ośniecka-Tamecka (Natolin)	Marija Pejčinović Burić (Bruges) & Ewa Ośniecka-Tamecka (Natolin)
2018–2019	Manuel Marín	468	Antonio Tajani (Bruges) & Tibor Navracsics (Natolin)	Gela Bezhuashvili, Radosław Sikorski, Borys Tarasyuk (Natolin)
2017-2018	Simone Veil	460	António Costa (Bruges) & Andrzej Duda (Natolin)	Mateusz Morawiecki, Wolfgang Schäuble (Natolin)
2016–2017	John Maynard Keynes	467	Jean-Claude Juncker (Bruges) & Ivanna Klympush-Tsintsadze (Natolin)	Atifete Jahjaga (Natolin)
2015–2016	Frédéric Chopin	469	Alexander Stubb (Bruges) & Johannes Hahn (Natolin)	Leszek Borysiewicz (Natolin)
2014–2015	Falcone & Borsellino	438	Mariano Rajoy (Bruges) & Petro Poroshenko (Natolin, cancelled)	Fathallah Sijilmassi (Natolin)
2013–2014	Voltaire	445	Íñigo Méndez de Vigo (Bruges) & Bronisław Komorowski (Natolin)	Rafał Trzaskowski (Natolin)
2012–2013	Václav Havel	441	Helle Thorning-Schmidt (Bruges) & Vladimir Filat (Natolin)	Ivo Josipović (Natolin)
2011–2012	Marie Sklodowska-Curie	435	Giorgio Napolitano (Bruges) & José Manuel Barroso (Natolin)	Marija Pejcinović Burić (Natolin)
2010–2011	Albert Einstein	424	Angela Merkel (Bruges) & Štefan Füle (Natolin)	Jerzy Buzek (Natolin)
2009–2010	Charles Darwin	402	Jerzy Buzek (Bruges) & Toomas Hendrik Ilves (Natolin)	
2008–2009	Marcus Aurelius	376	Yves Leterme (Bruges) & Hans-Gert Pöttering (Natolin)	
2007–2008	Anna Politkovskaya & Hrant Dink	415	David Miliband (Bruges) & Carl Bildt (Natolin)	
2006–2007	Nicolaus Copernicus	418	Jean-Claude Juncker (Bruges) & Alaksandar Milinkievič (Natolin)	
2005–2006	Ludwig van Beethoven	385	Javier Solana (Bruges) & Viktor Yushchenko (Natolin)	
2004–2005	Montesquieu	404	José Manuel Barroso (Bruges) & Josep Borrell Fontelles (Natolin)	
2003–2004	John Locke	391	Joschka Fischer (Bruges) & Danuta Hübner (Natolin)	
2002–2003	Bertha von Suttner	370	Valéry Giscard d'Estaing (Bruges) & Erhard Busek (Natolin)	
2001–2002	Simon Stevin	365	Aleksander Kwasniewski (Bruges) & Guy Verhofstadt (Natolin)	
2000–2001	Aristotle	375	George Papandreou (Bruges) & Jan Kulakowski (Natolin)	
1999–2000	Wilhelm & Alexander von Humboldt	374	Jacques Delors (Bruges) & Jean-Luc Dehaene (Natolin)	
1998–1999	Leonardo da Vinci	337	Jean-Luc Dehaene (Bruges) & Prince Philippe, Duke of Brabant (Natolin)	
1997–1998	Hendrik Brugmans	326	António Guterres (Bruges) & Ursula Stenzel (Natolin)	
1996–1997	Alexis de Tocqueville	319	Wim Kok (Bruges) & Aleksander Kwasniewski (Natolin)	
1995–1996	Walter Hallstein	306	Klaus Hänsch (Bruges) & Jacques Santer (Natolin)	
1994–1995	Ramon Llull	296	Juan Carlos I of Spain (Bruges) & Andrzej Olechowski (Natolin)	
1993–1994	Stefan Zweig	263	Thomas Klestil	
1992–1993	Charles IV	264	Jacques Santer	
1991–1992	Wolfgang Amadeus Mozart	212	Flavio Cotti	
1990–1991	Hans & Sophie Scholl	245	Richard von Weizsäcker	
1989–1990	Denis de Rougemont	200	Jacques Delors	
1988–1989	Christopher Dawson	204	Margaret Thatcher	
1987–1988	Altiero Spinelli	178	François Mitterrand	
1986–1987	William Penn	177	Ruud Lubbers	
1985–1986	Christopher Columbus	158	Felipe González	
1984–1985	Madame de Staël	123	Altiero Spinelli	
1983–1984	Jean Rey	133	Garret FitzGerald	
1982–1983	Joseph Bech	122	Gaston Thorn	
1981–1982	Johan Willem Beyen	123	Bruno Kreisky	
1980–1981	Jean Monnet	131	Simone Veil	
1979–1980	Salvador de Madariaga	140	Dries van Agt	
1978–1979	Paul-Henri Spaak	130	Guy Spitaels	
1977–1978	Karl Renner	128	Mario Soares	
1976–1977	Peter Paul Rubens	120	Leo Tindemans	
1975–1976	Adam Jerzy Czartoryski	101	Edgar Faure	
1974–1975	Aristide Briand	111	Herman De Croo	
1973–1974	Giuseppe Mazzini	92	Karl Otto Pöhl	
1972–1973	Richard von Coudenhove-Kalergi	59	George Brown	
1971–1972	Dante Alighieri	58	Altiero Spinelli	
1970–1971	Winston Churchill	57	Jean Rey	
1969–1970	William the Silent	49	Prince Albert of Belgium	
1968–1969	Konrad Adenauer	47	Robert van Schendel	
1967–1968	Comenius	54	Alfons de Vreese	
1966–1967	George C. Marshall	56	Jean Rey & J. Robert Schaetzel	
1965–1966	Thomas More	52	Hendrik Brugmans	
1964–1965	Robert Schuman	45	Salvador de Madariaga	
1963–1964	Thomas Paine	48	Hendrik Brugmans	
1962–1963	August Vermeylen	46	Pierre Harmel	
1961–1962	Gottfried Wilhelm Leibniz	37	Hugo Geiger	
1960–1961	Saint-Simon	38	Hendrik Brugmans	
1959–1960	Sully	43	Hendrik Brugmans	
1958–1959	Fridtjof Nansen	40	Hendrik Brugmans	
1957–1958	Henry the Navigator	40	Hendrik Brugmans	
1956–1957	Raoul Dautry	36	Hendrik Brugmans	
1955–1956	Virgil	33	Hendrik Brugmans	
1954–1955	Alcide De Gasperi	36	Hendrik Brugmans	
1953–1954	Erasmus	39	Hendrik Brugmans	
1952–1953	Tomáš Garrigue Masaryk	40	Hendrik Brugmans	
1951–1952	Juan Vives	30	Hendrik Brugmans	
1950–1951	Antoine de Saint-Exupéry	35	Hendrik Brugmans	
1949	Préparatoire (no name)	22	Salvador de Madariaga	

The following chart shows the evolution of student numbers over time:

Raw data
Evolution of student numbers at the College of Europe (1949–2025)

== Notable people ==
=== Alumni ===
Many former students of the College, referred to as anciens (French for alumni), have gone on to serve as heads of state and government, ministers, parliamentarians, diplomats, judges, senior civil servants, academics, journalists and business leaders. Since its founding, the College has educated more than 17,000 students from over 70 countries. In 2021, a sample compiled by Politico Europe found the College to be the most represented alma mater among senior European Union officials.

Selection of Notable College of Europe Alumni

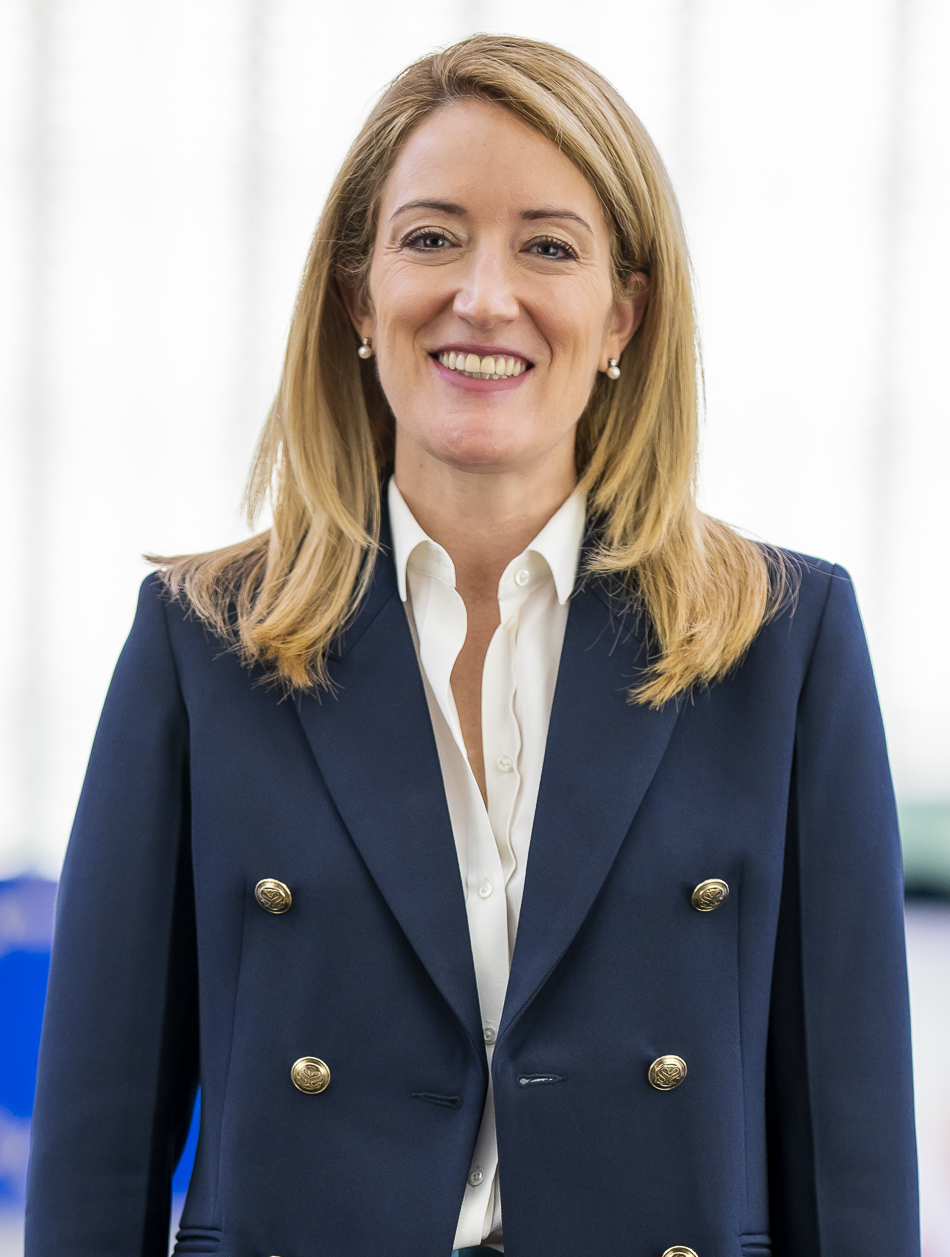
Roberta Metsola, 17th President of the European Parliament (Locke, 2004)

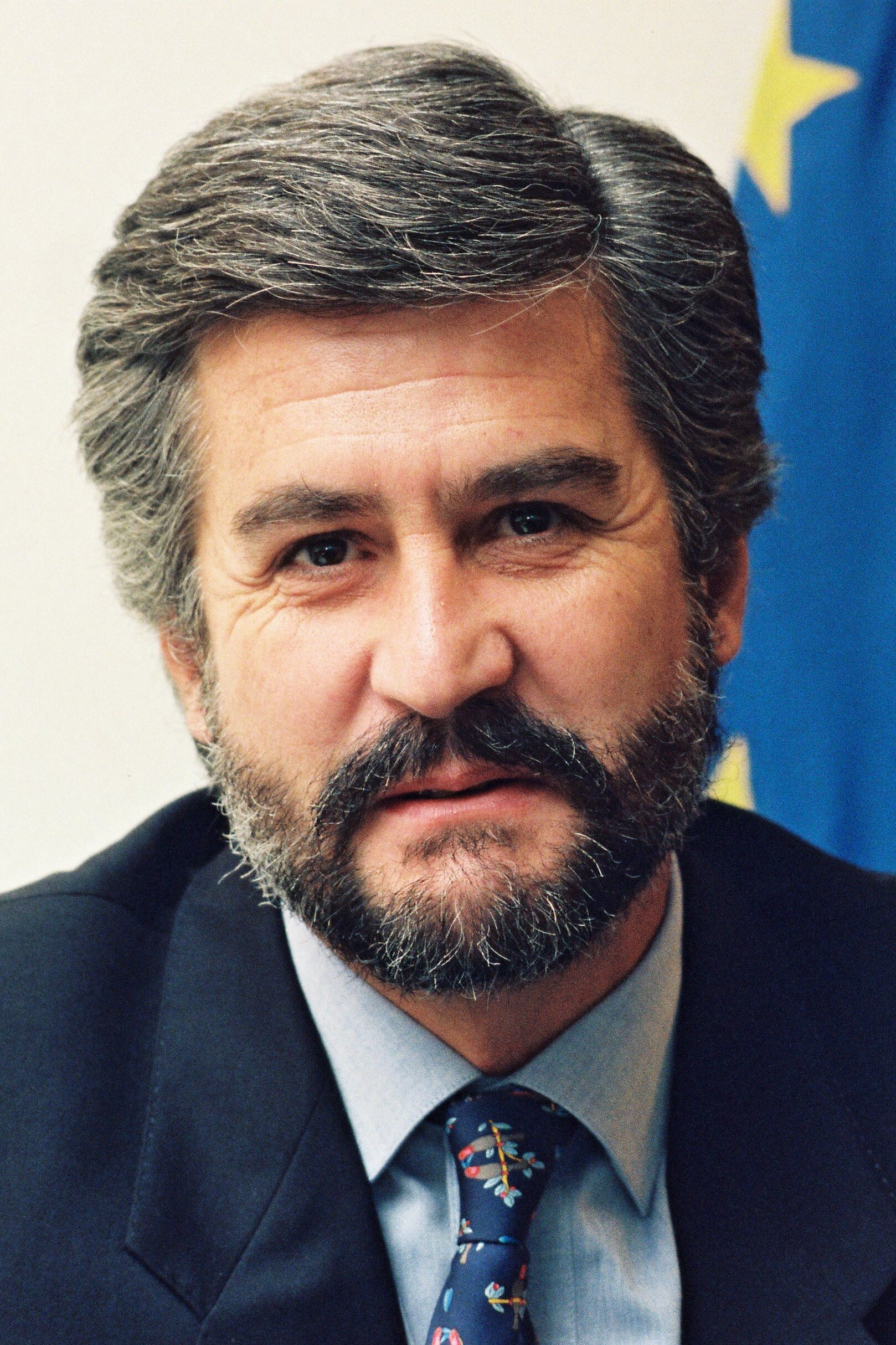
Manuel Marín, Acting President of the European Commission (Mazzini, 1974)

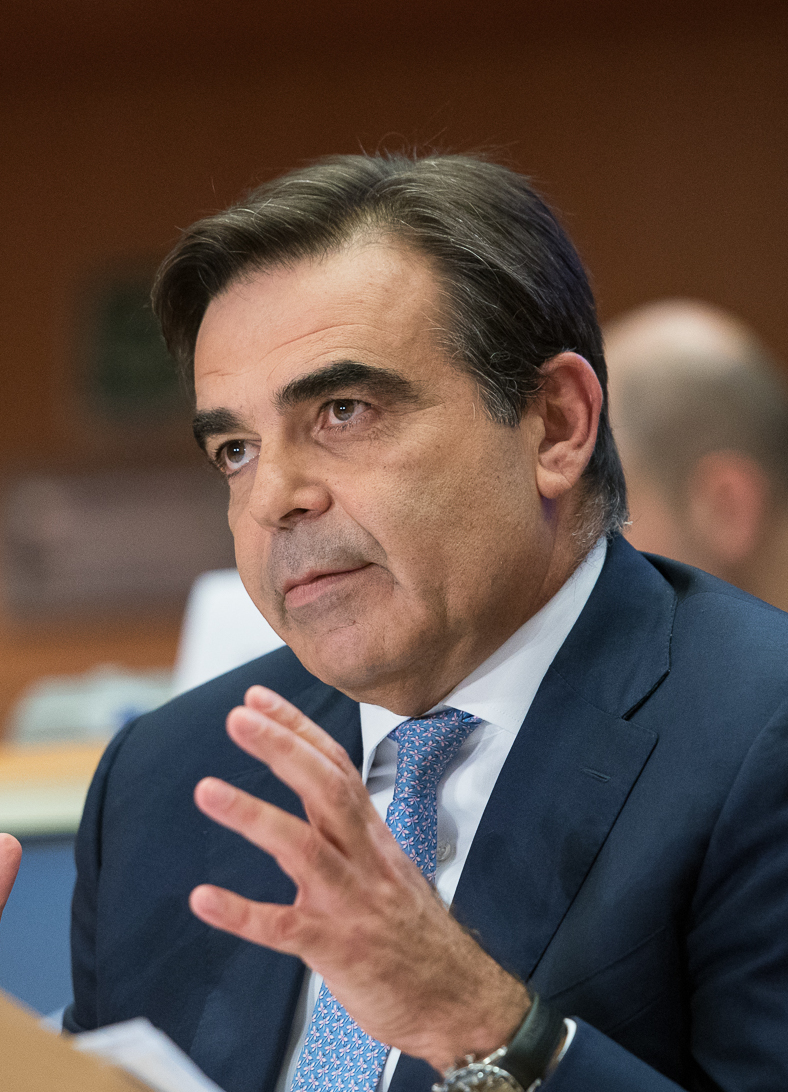
Margaritis Schinas, Vice-President of the European Commission (Columbus, 1986)

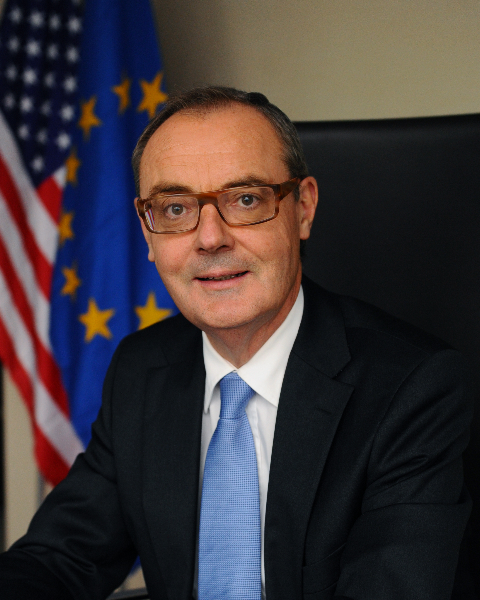
David O’Sullivan, 4th Secretary-General of the European Commission (Czartoryski, 1976)

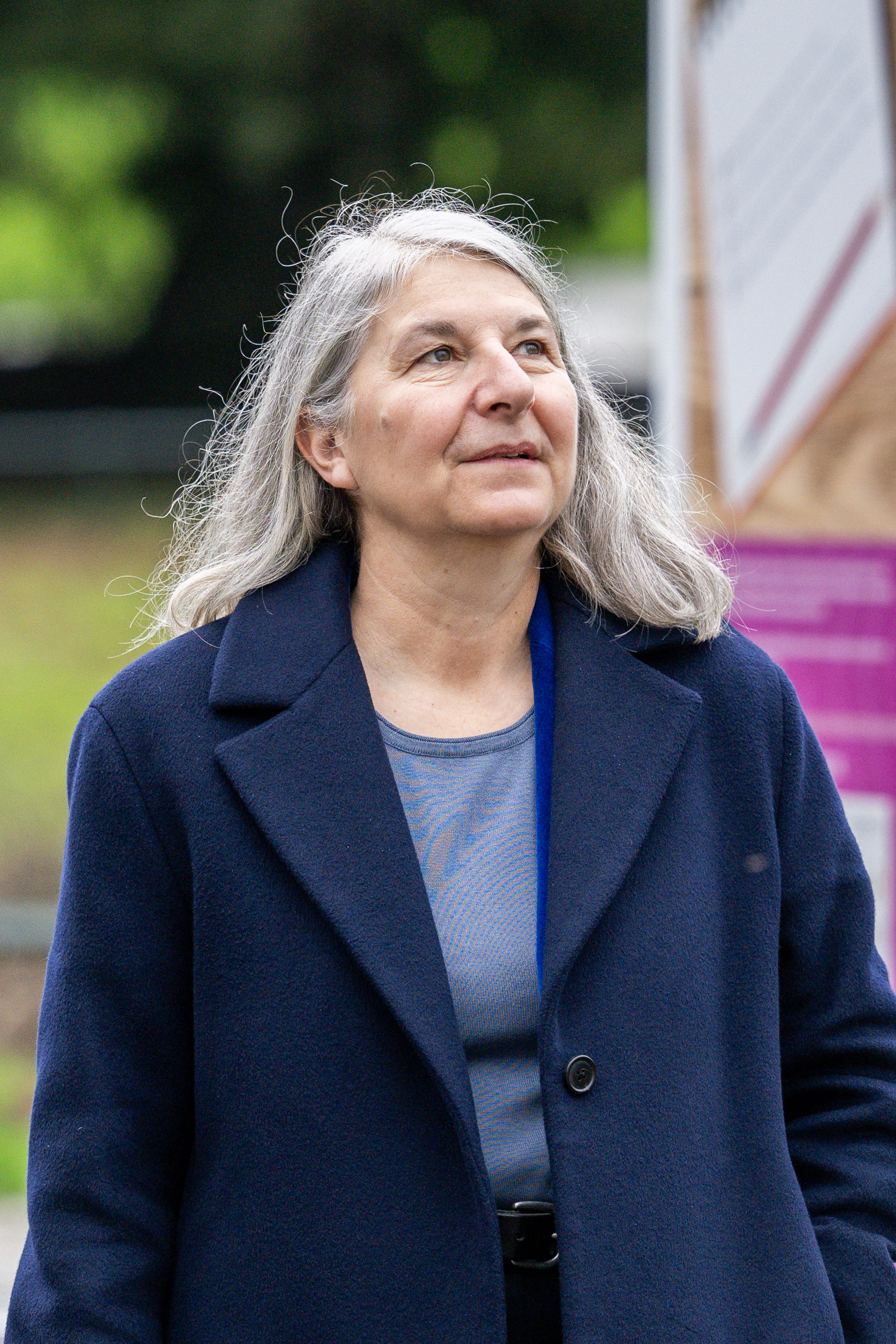
Thérèse Blanchet, 9th Secretary-General of the European Council and Council of the European Union (Dawson, 1989)

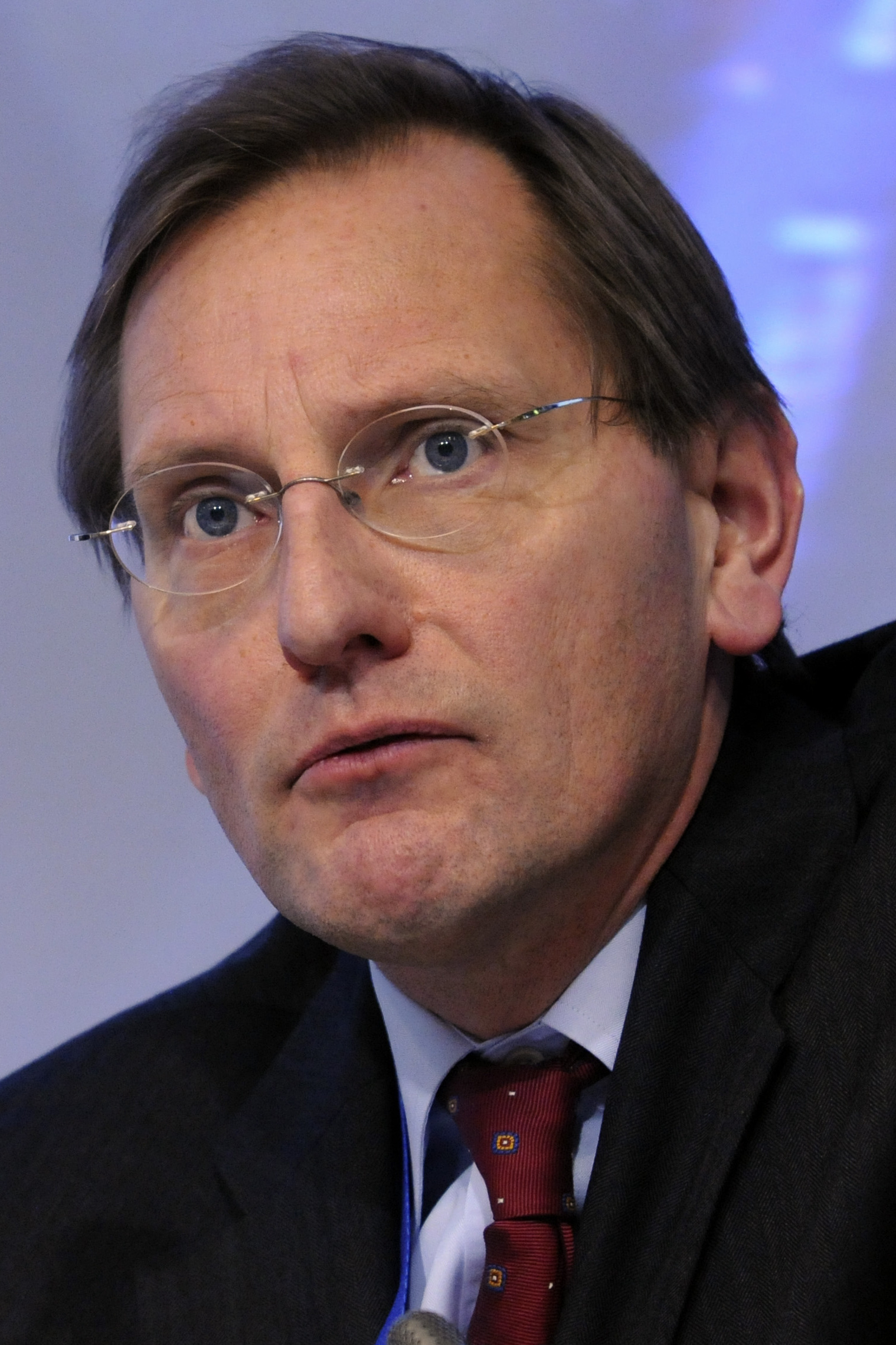
Marc van der Woude, 5th President of the General Court of the European Union (Rey, 1984)

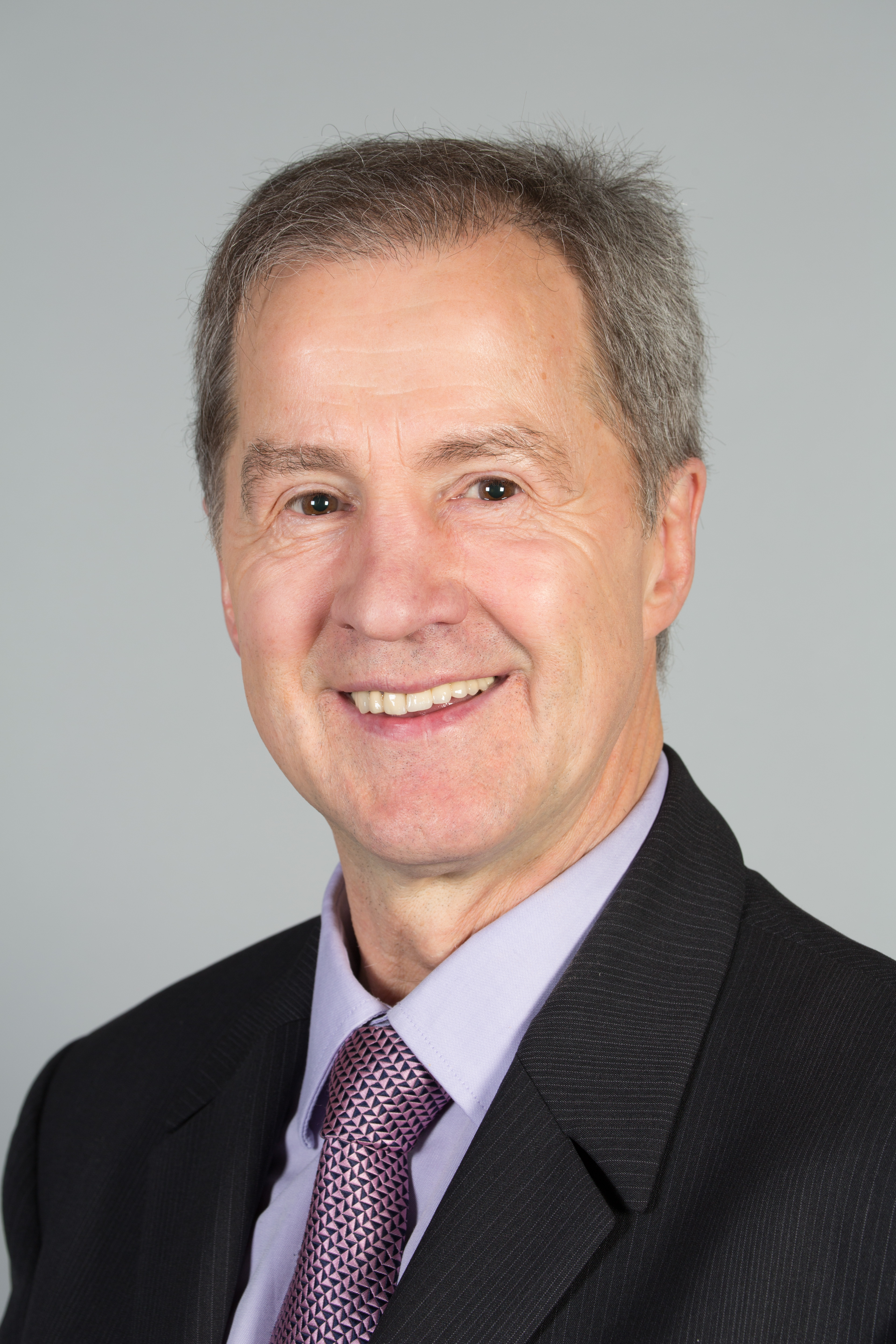
Jo Leinen, President of the Union of European Federalists & Member of the European Parliament (Mazzini, 1974)

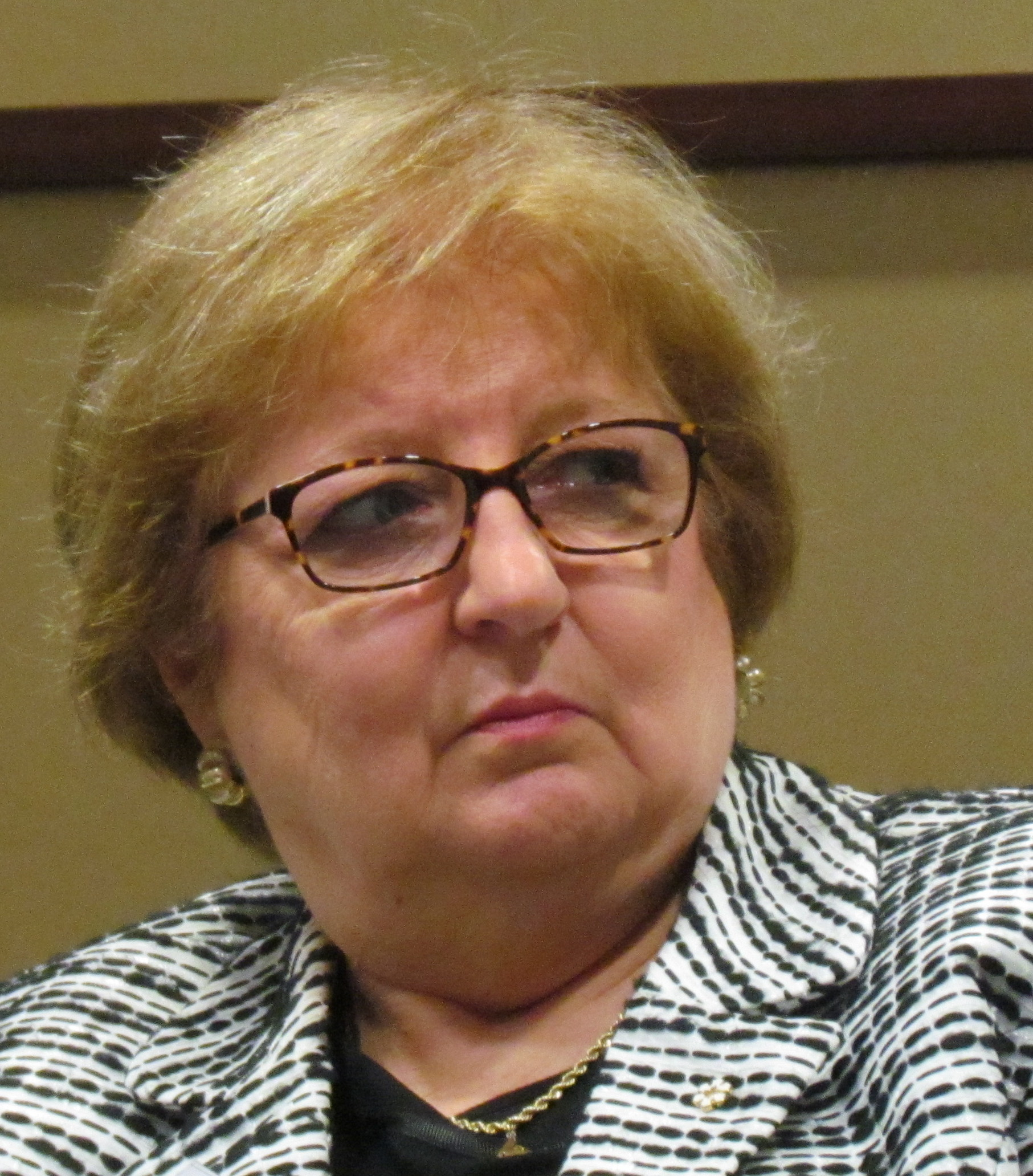
Louise Fréchette, 1st United Nations Deputy Secretary-General (Renner, 1978)

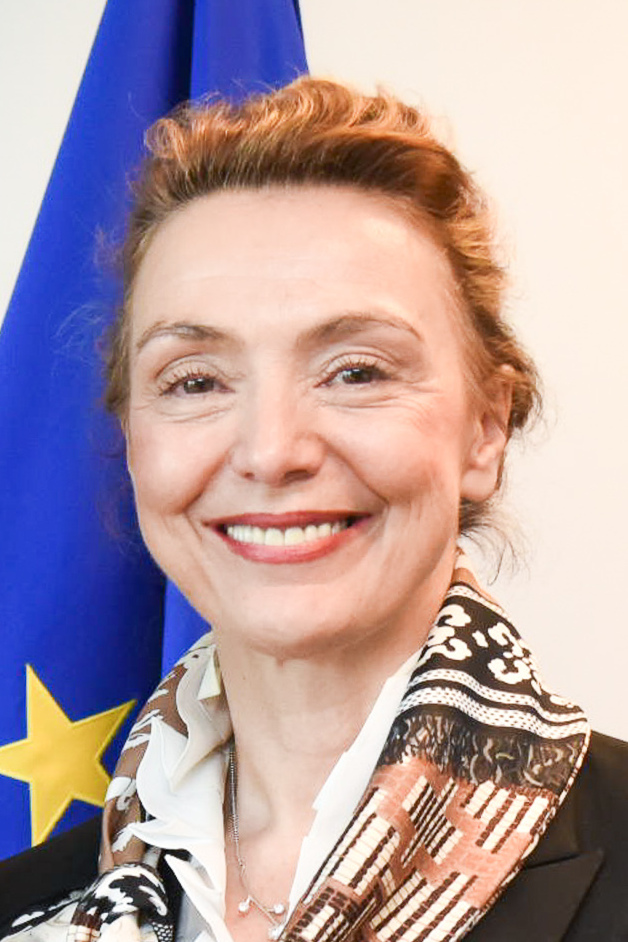
Marija Pejčinović Burić, 15th Secretary-General of the Council of Europe (Zweig, 1994)

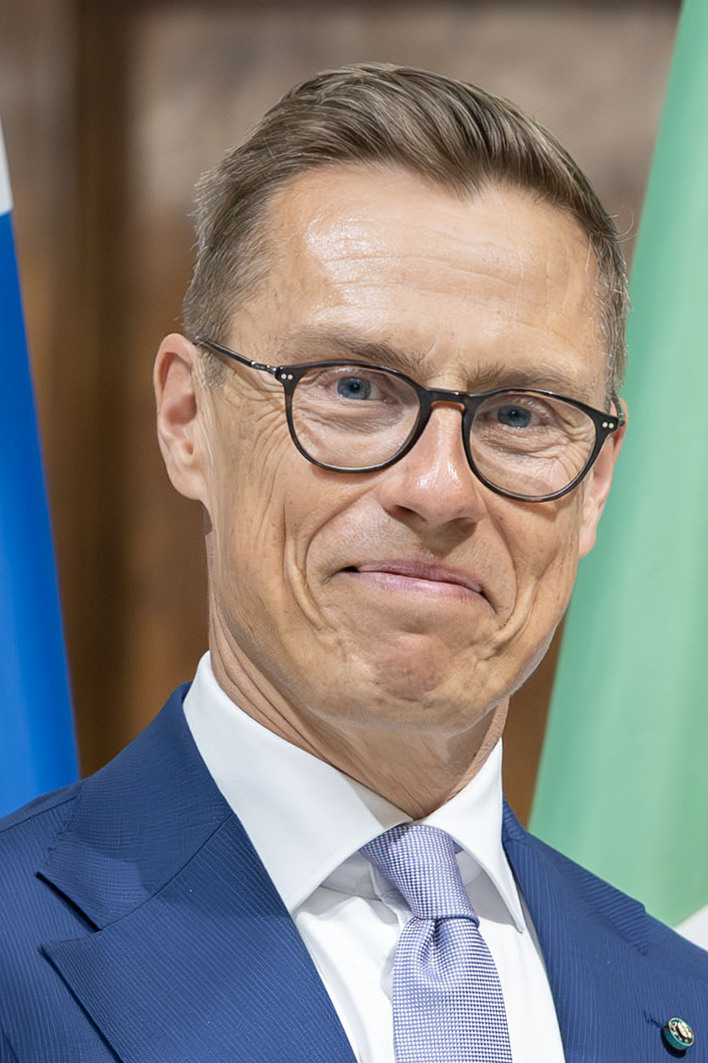
Alexander Stubb, 13th President of Finland & 43rd Prime Minister of Finland (Llull, 1995)

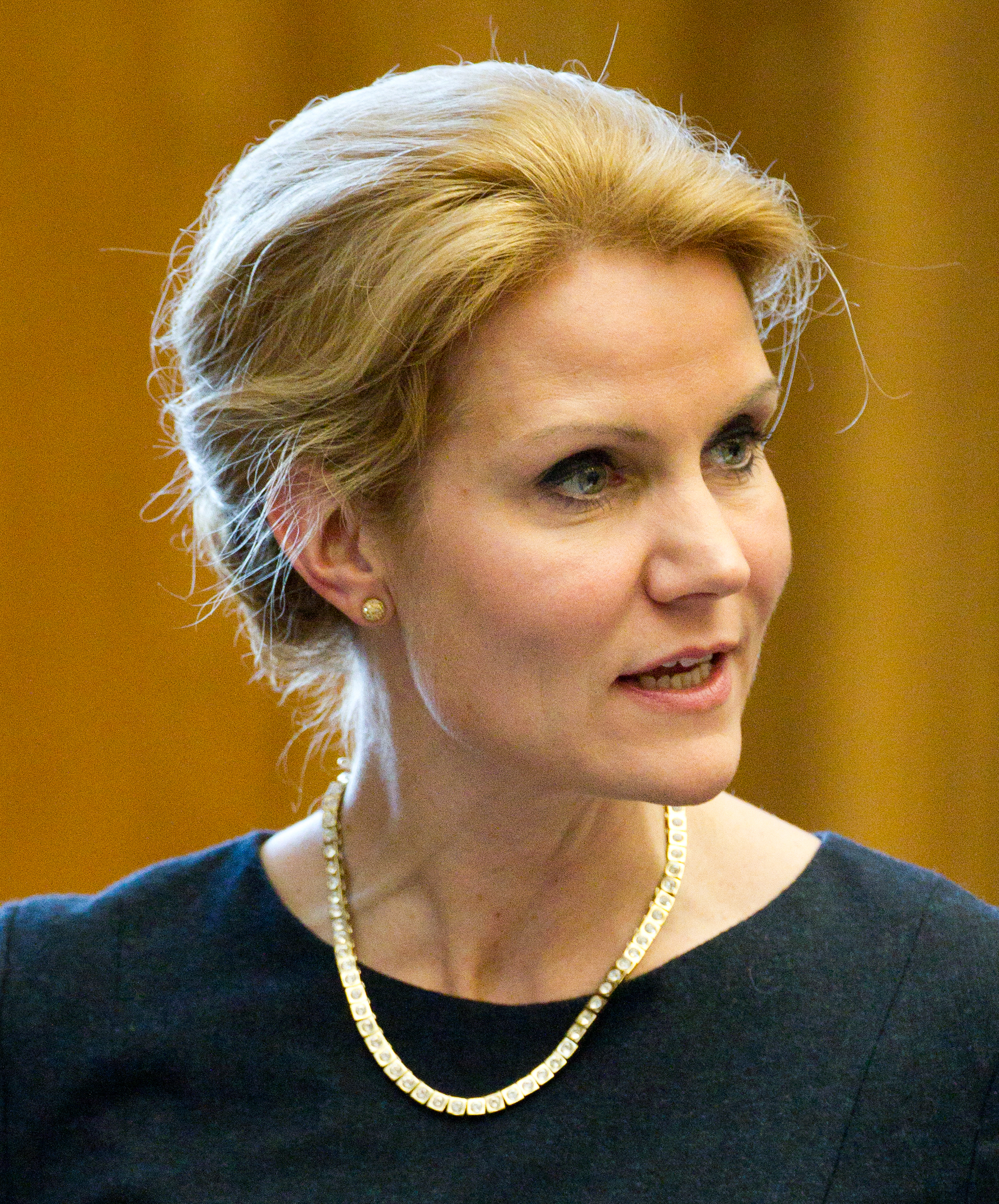
Helle Thorning-Schmidt, 26th Prime Minister of Denmark (Charles IV, 1993)

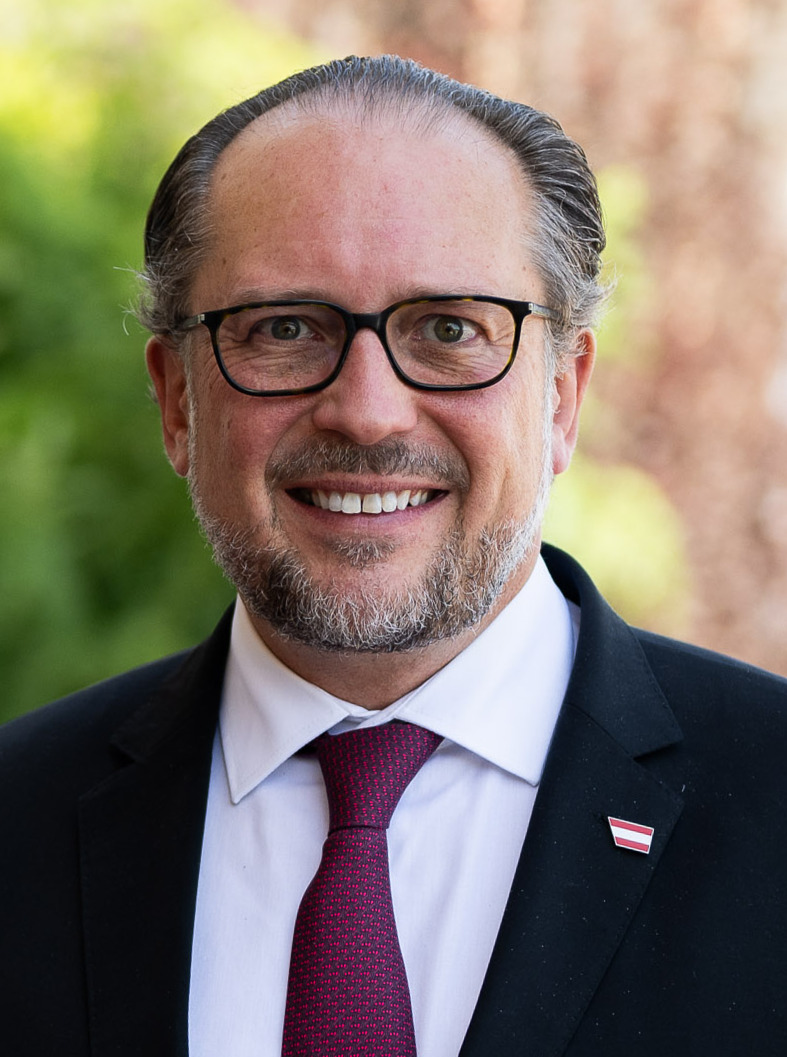
Alexander Schallenberg, 27th Chancellor of Austria (Hallstein, 1996)

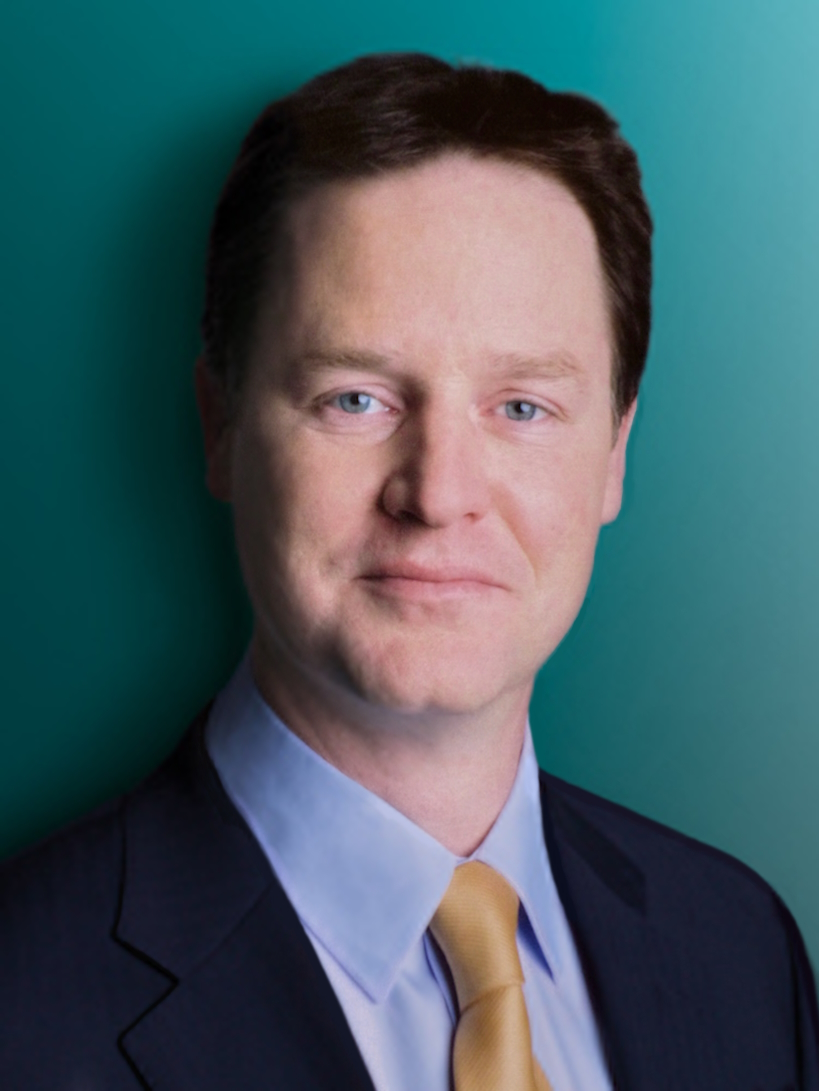
Nick Clegg, 4th Deputy Prime Minister of the United Kingdom (Mozart, 1992)

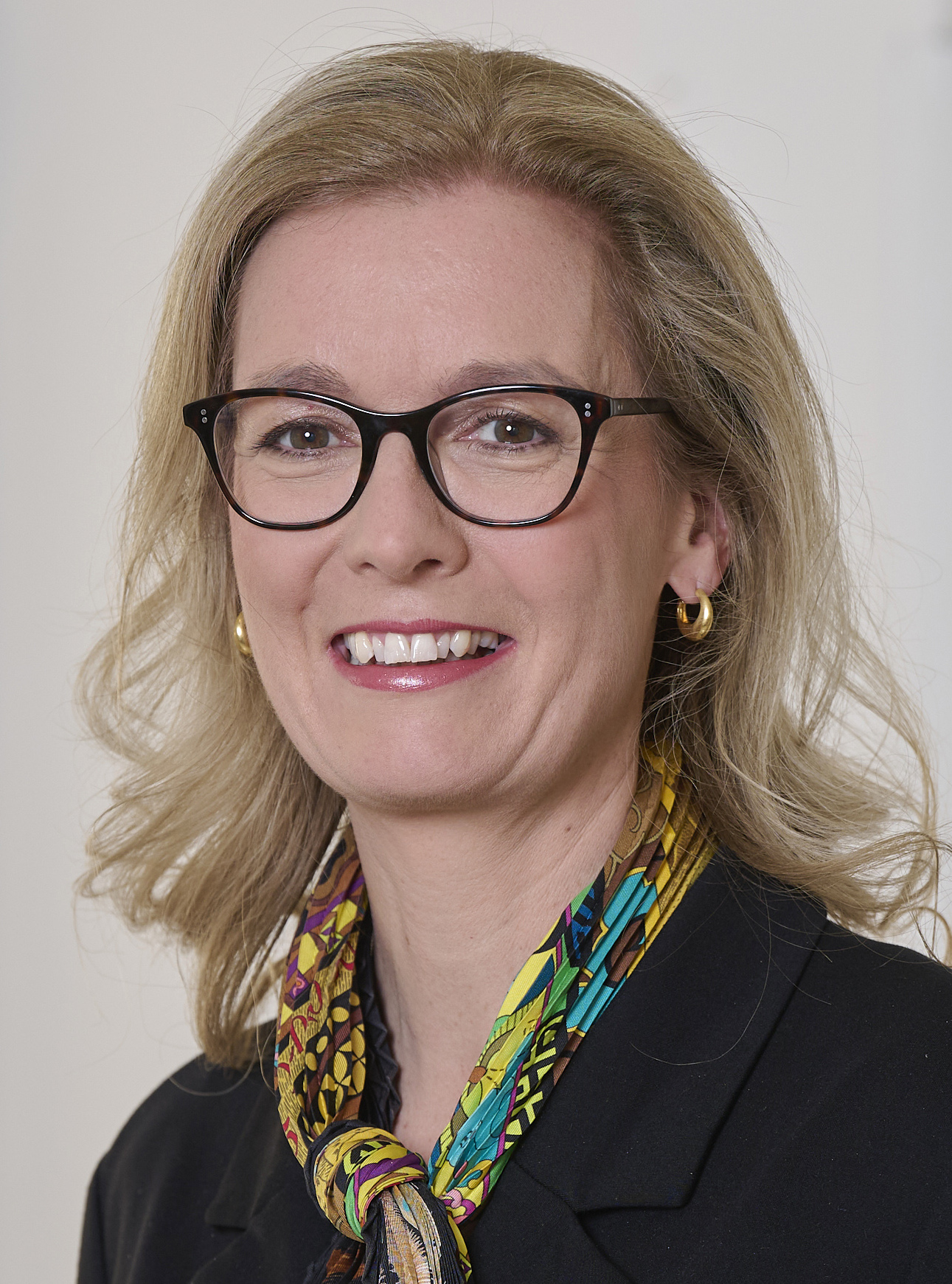
Sabine Monauni, 20th Deputy Prime Minister of Liechtenstein (Aristotle, 2001)

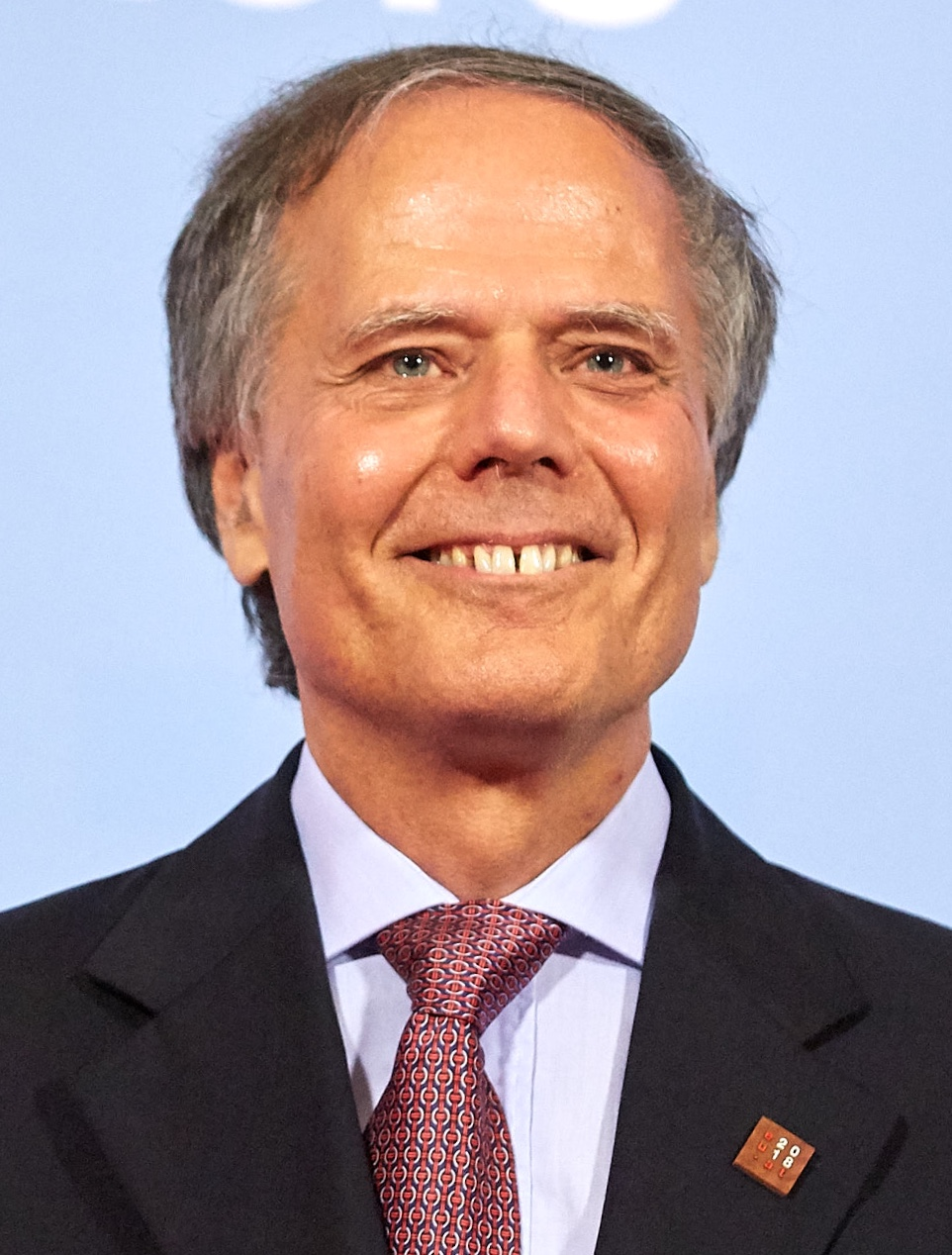
Enzo Moavero Milanesi, Foreign Minister of Italy (Beyen, 1982)

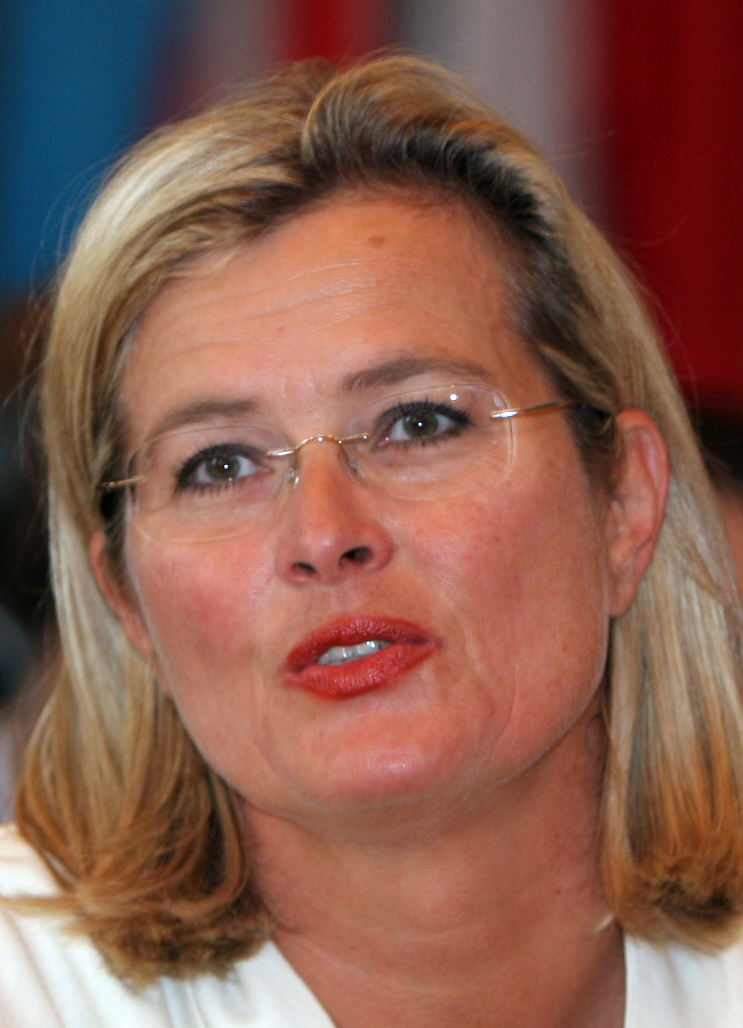
Ursula Plassnik, Foreign Minister of Austria (De Madriaga, 1980)

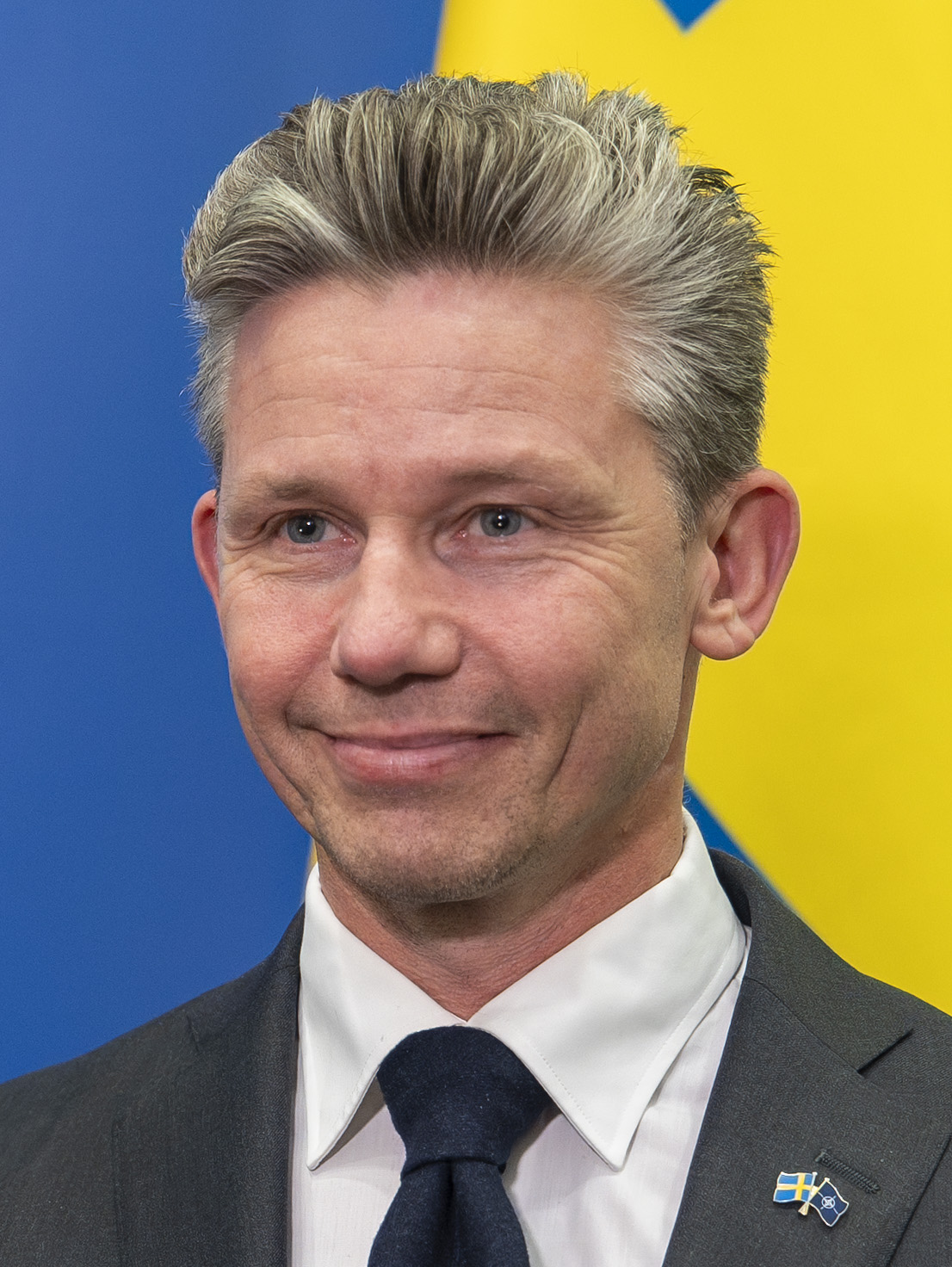
Pål Jonson, Defence Minister of Sweden (Da Vinci, 1999)

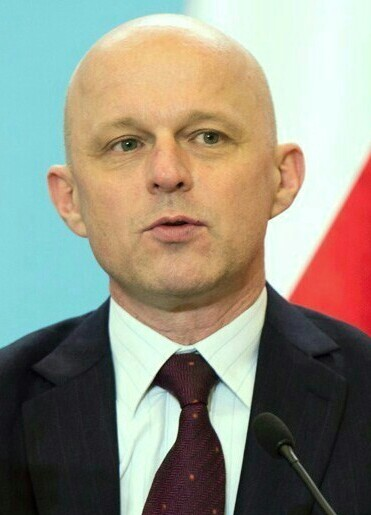
Paweł Szałamacha, Finance Minister of Poland (Zweig, 1994)

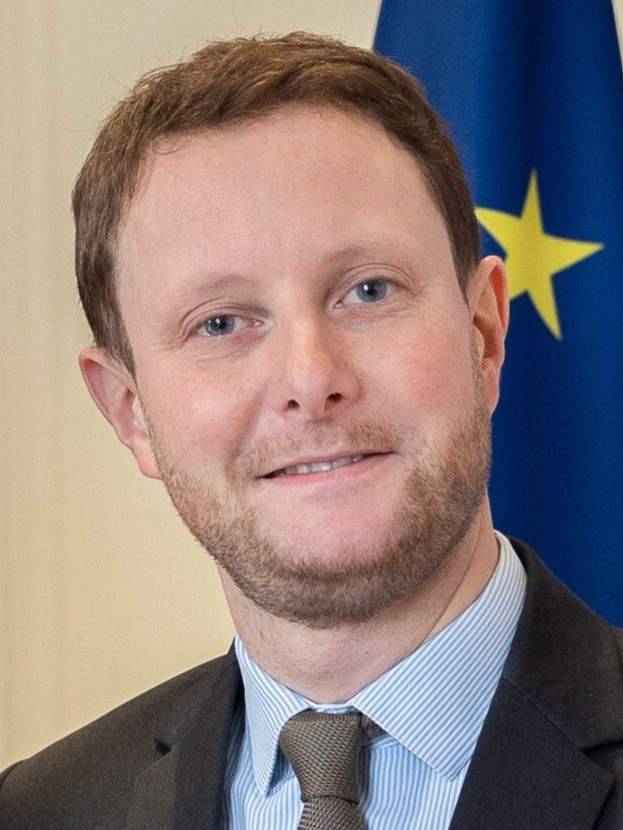
Clément Beaune, Minister Delegate for Transport of France (Montesquieu, 2005)

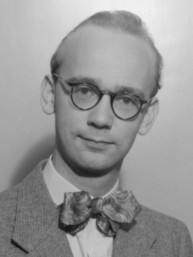
Jon Ola Norbom, Finance Minister of Norway (Masaryk, 1953)

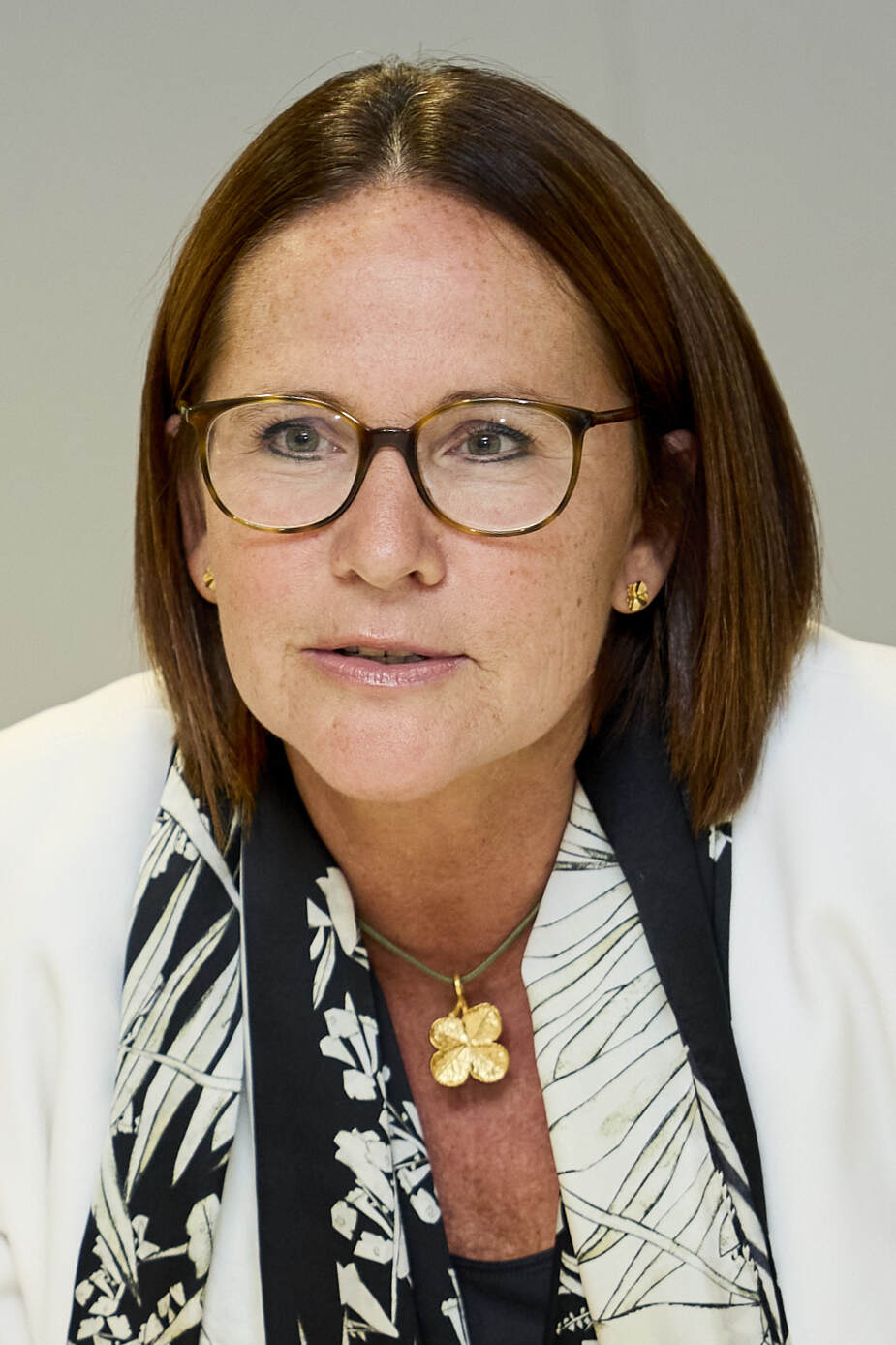
Yuriko Backes, Finance Minister of Luxembourg (Zweig, 1994)

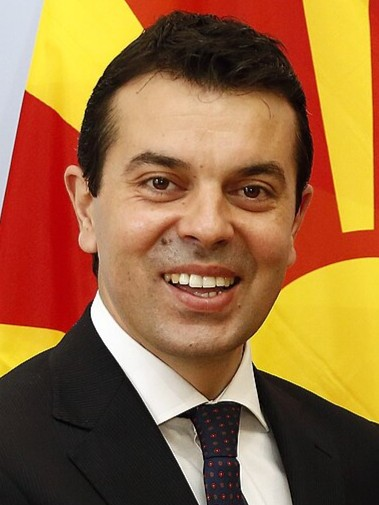
Nikola Poposki, Foreign Minister of North Macedonia (Montesquieu, 2005)

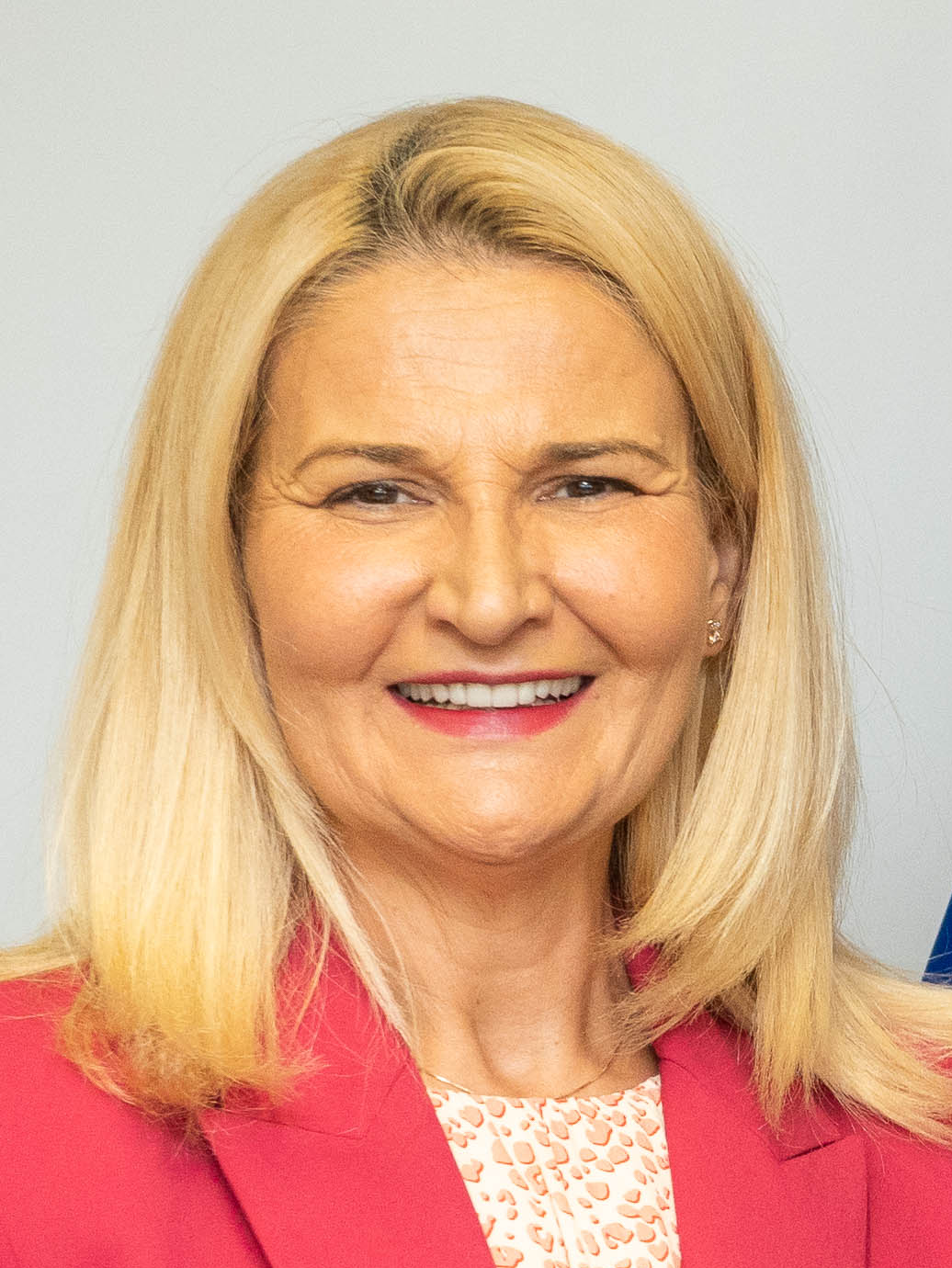
Tanja Miščević, European Integration Minister of Serbia (Locke, 2004)

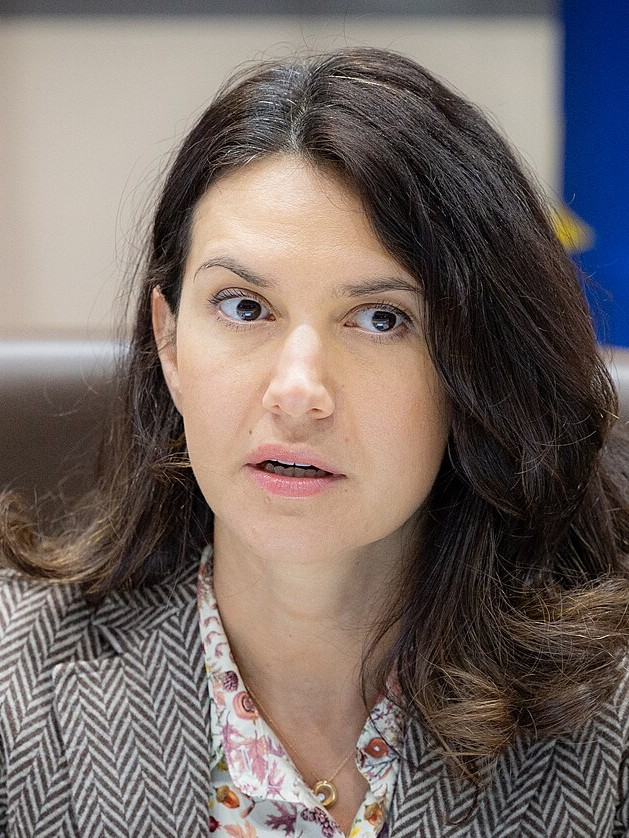
Olesea Stamate, Justice Minister of Moldova (Montesquieu, 2005)

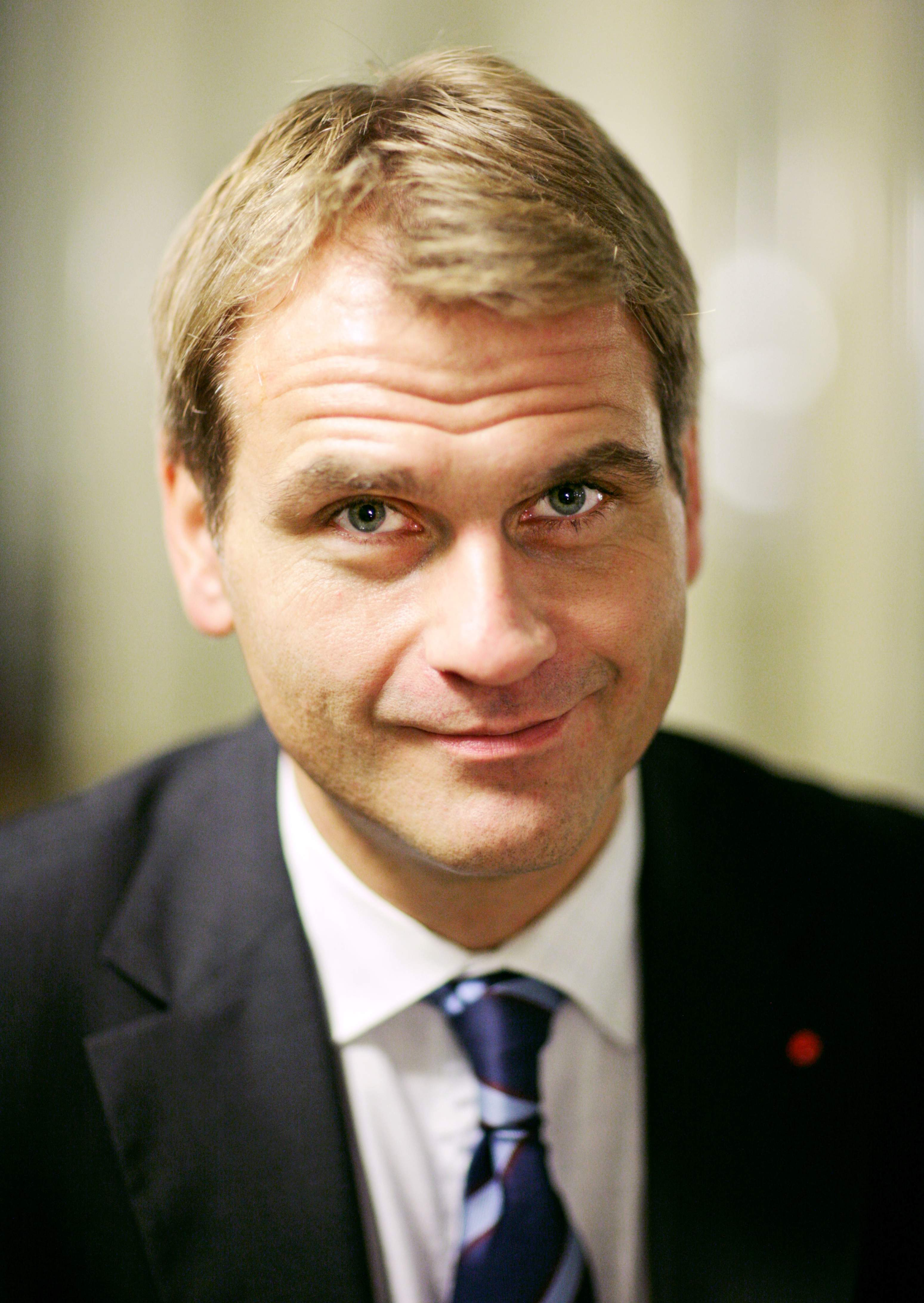
Árni Páll Árnason, Economy Minister of Iceland (Mozart, 1992)

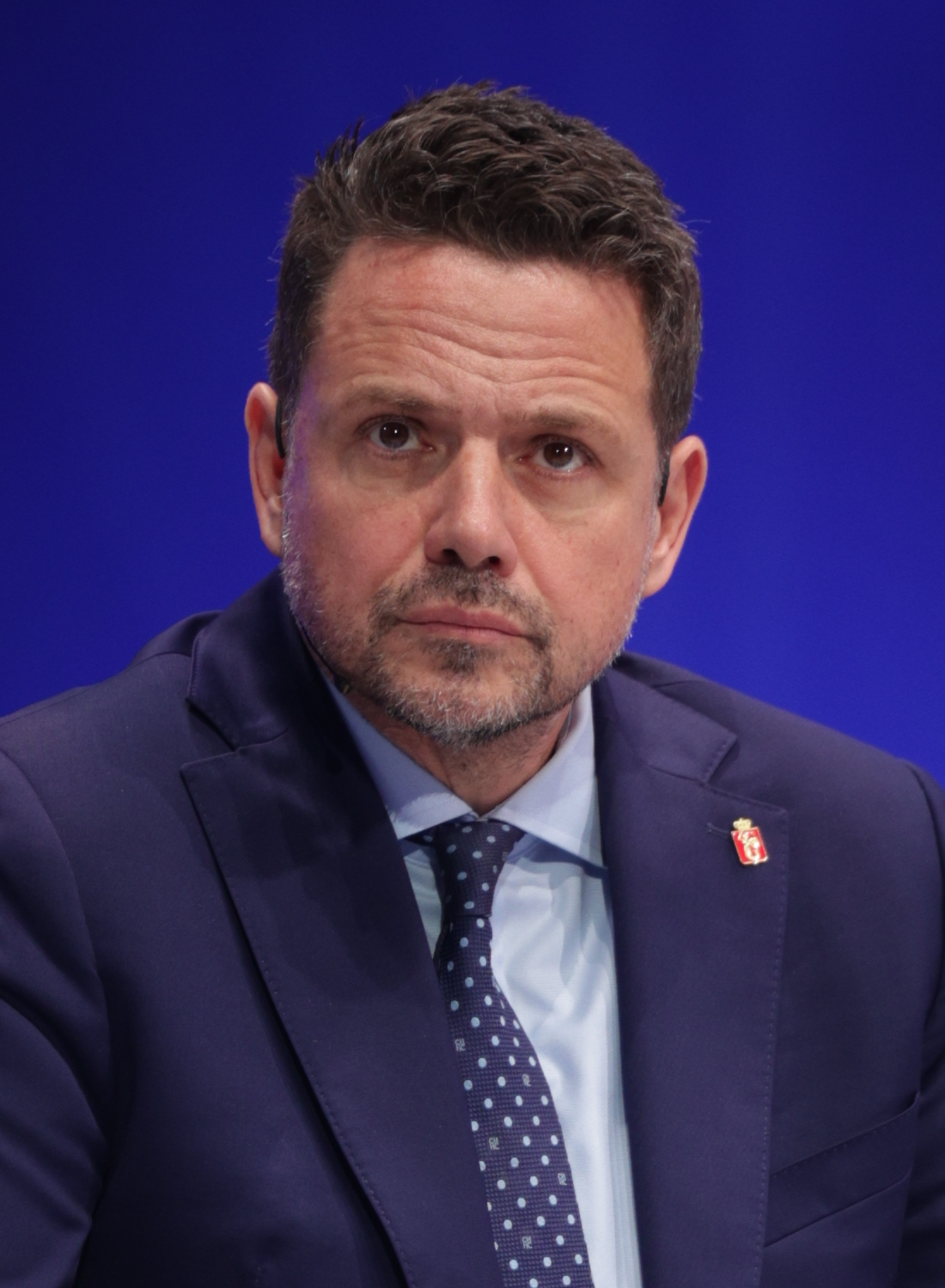
Rafał Trzaskowski, Mayor of Warsaw & Deputy Foreign Affairs Minister of Poland (De Tocqueville, 1997)

The College’s alumni count 4 heads of state or government, multiple deputy prime ministers, national ministers, members of national parliaments, constitutional court judges, attorney-generals, and senior national and regional civil servants from numerous countries.

Former students have also included 1 President of the European Parliament, 1 acting President of the European Commission, 2 Vice-Presidents of the European Commission, 1 Secretary-General of the European Commission, 1 Secretary General of the European Council and Council of the European Union, and 1 Secretary-General of the European External Action Service. Other alumni have been at least 16 Members of the European Parliament, 17 Director-Generals of the European Commission, as well as 2 presidents, and several judges or advocates general of the Court of Justice of the European Union.

Beyond the European Union, former students have held leading posts in international organisations, including Secretary-General of the Council of Europe, United Nations Deputy Secretary-General, United Nations Under-Secretary-General for Legal Affairs, and Secretary-General of the United Nations World Tourism Organization. Others have held senior positions at the World Bank, UNESCO, and the International Labour Organization, or sat as judges at the European Court of Human Rights or the International Tribunal for the Law of the Sea.

More than ninety alumni have served as ambassadors or permanent representatives for the European Union or national governments. They have represented their countries or the EU at the United Nations, NATO, the European Union, and the Organization for Security and Co-operation in Europe, and have held diplomatic assignments in different countries, including the United States, China, India, Japan, Russia, and the United Kingdom.

Some others have achieved notability in academia, journalism, literature, civil society, and business. These alumni include professors at major European universities, editors and journalists, award-winning writers, civil society leaders, and business executives or founders.

== Controversies ==
=== Controversy concerning Saudi Arabia ===
In February 2019, a series of press pieces published by EUobserver revealed that the Bruges-based institute was paid by the Saudi government to set up private meetings between Saudi ambassadors, EU officials, and MEPs. Although EU lobby transparency rules say that academic institutions should register if they "deal with EU activities and policies and are in touch with the EU institutions", the College of Europe is not listed in the EU joint-transparency register. On 13 February, MEP Alyn Smith of Greens/EFA wrote to ask Jörg Monar, Rector of the College of Europe, to provide assurances that the institute has not received "financial contributions from the Saudi authorities in any form" in its efforts to set up meetings with the EU institutions. On 20 February, Marietje Schaake of the ALDE group presented a written question to the European Commission on this issue. This written question was the subject of a response from the European Commission published on 17 May in which it explained not having any direct evidence as to the facts reported, nor being able to comment on the sources of revenue of the College of Europe beyond European subsidies. A group of College alumni collected signatures to demand the institution to stop organising private meetings between MEPs and the Saudi government.

In a letter to the president of the European Parliament's Budget Control Committee Ingeborg Gräßle, Jörg Monar, Rector of the College of Europe, confirmed the organization of trainings for Saudi officials and criticized the media for reporting them as lobbying. The rector indicated that these meetings had no lobbying dimension but sought to show to the Saudis the reasons why the Union defended certain values, privileging communication over isolation to defend European values.

Inside Arabia Online, an online publication, characterised the lobbying by Saudi Arabia as part of a concerted effort to reverse the Kingdom's inclusion on the EU's "blacklist", which intends to penalize countries failing to combat terrorism financing and money laundering.

=== Allegations of sexual harassment and misogyny ===
The French language weekly news magazine Le Vif/L'Express published an article on 21 February 2019 based on the testimony of former students from recent years. The article reported a culture of sexual harassment and misogyny at the College of Europe. Cases of sexual harassment and inappropriate behaviour were described in the magazine, including frotteurism, forced kisses and groping. Various students reported to Le Vif/L'Express that the administration observes a code of silence on this issue. Cases of inappropriate behaviours by the academic staff were also reported. Contacted by Le Vif/L'Express magazine, the administration replied that: "In some occasions in the past, some students have crossed the personal barriers of other students". On 5 March 2019, a former student of the College of Europe, published an opinion in Le Vif/L'Express magazine, stating that a culture of sexual harassment and misogyny existed at the College of Europe when she was studying there.

In 2024, Politico Europe published an article detailing longstanding accusations of sexual harassment by an unnamed professor at the university. The article details that accusations against the professor had been logged as long ago as 2012, but that he continued to be employed by the university. The publication of that article led to the dismissal of the professor Olivier Costa, whose identity was revealed further by Politico after the end of the disciplinary procedure.

=== European Diplomatic Academy procurement corruption allegations ===
In December 2025, the Belgian police, on instructions by the European Public Prosecutor's Office (EPPO) and a Belgian investigating magistrate, raided the College of Europe premises in Bruges as well as the headquarters of the European External Action Service in Brussels as part of an investigation into suspected fraud related to EU-funded training for junior diplomats. The EPPO alleges that the College of Europe had prior knowledge that it would be attributed the bid to host the European Diplomatic Academy and purchased a new property based on this prior expectation. The rector, Federica Mogherini, as well as a high-ranking EU official and former Italian ambassador, Stefano Sannini, and a College of Europe staff member were detained as part of the investigation. On 4 December 2025, Mogherini resigned as rector.

== See also ==
- European University Institute
- Centre international de formation européenne
- Europa-Institut of Saarland University
- European Academy of Sciences and Arts
- Una Europa
