= Ewa Ośniecka-Tamecka =

Polish politician (born 1962)

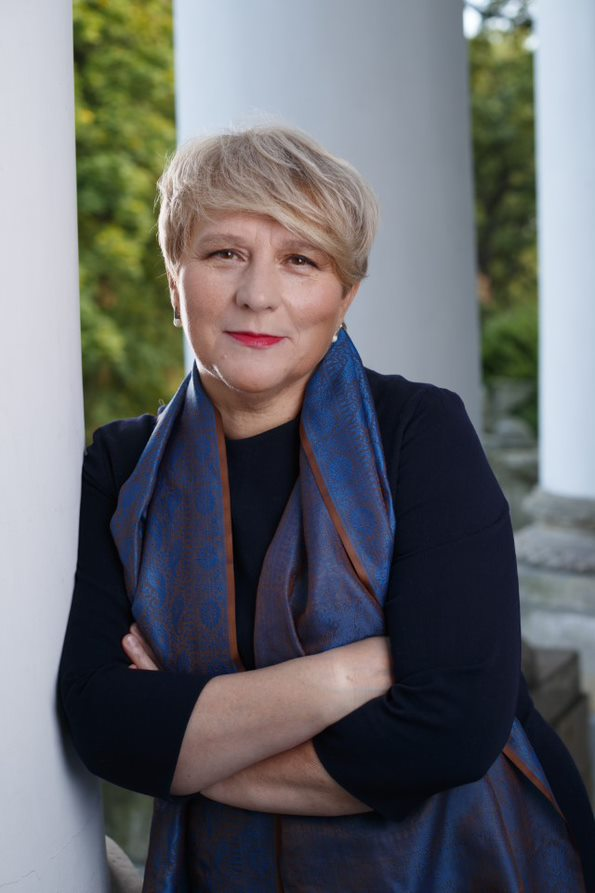

Vice-Rector of College of Europe
- Incumbent
- Assumed office 18 January 2007
- Preceded by: Robert Picht

Acting Rector of the College of Europe
- In office 12 December 2025 – 1 July 2026
- Preceded by: Federica Mogherini
- Succeeded by: João Gomes Cravinho
- In office 1 November 2014 – 30 November 2019

7th Minister for European Affairs
- In office 13 April 2006 – 16 August 2007
- Preceded by: Jarosław Pietras
- Succeeded by: Tomasz Nowakowski

Personal details
- Born: Ewa Ośniecka; 24 December 1962 (age 63) Łódź, Poland
- Party: Independent
- Profession: Economist

Ewa Ośniecka-Tamecka (born 24 December 1962 in Łódź) is a Polish politician, in the years from 2006 to 2007 the Secretary of State at the Office of the Committee for European Integration, since 2007, Vice-Rector of the College of Europe in Natolin (Warsaw), Poland.

Ewa Ośniecka-Tamecka dedicated her career to work in Polish public administration. In the years 1991-2001 and 2006-2007 she successfully combined work in the most important organs of the government and established in Poland branches of three major European educational and training institutions: the College of Europe, the European University Institute in Florence and the European Institute of Public Administration in Maastricht.

== Family ==
She was born on 24 December 1962 as Ewa Ośniecka. In 1990 she married Grzegorz Tamecki with whom she has three children, Łukasz, Tomasz and Zofia.

== Education and professional career ==
In 1981 she finished her studies at the High School No. 26 in the city of Łódź (presently the Krzysztof Kamil Baczyński High School No. 26).

She then graduated from the Faculty of Economics and Sociology at the University of Łódź, obtaining Master's degrees from the Department of Foreign Trade in 1987 and from the Department of Trade in Goods and Services in 1988.

From 1988 to 1991 she worked as a teaching assistant at the University of Łódź.

In 1991 she was appointed Advisor to the Minister in the Office of the Government Plenipotentiary for European Integration and Foreign Assistance in the then Office of the Council of Ministers, the present Chancellery of the Prime Minister of Poland.

From 1992 to 1996 she held the post of Chief of Staff of the Office of the Government Plenipotentiary for European Integration and Foreign Assistance, as well as the post of Director of the Phare SIERRA Management Unit.

Since 1993 Ewa Ośniecka-Tamecka has been Member of the Council of Natolin European Centre, a Polish think-tank conducting research focusing on foreign policy and European integration. Between 1997-2001 she was the Director of the foundation and since 2001 she has served as Secretary General of the board of the Natolin European Centre. Since 1994 she has been Member of the Council of the European Institute in Łódź.

From 2000 to 2001 she was Head of the Political Cabinet of the President of the Committee for European Integration.

From 1 March 2006 to 31 May 2006 she held the position of Undersecretary of State at the Office of the Committee for European Integration.

From 13 April 2006 to 16 August 2007 she was Secretary of the Committee for European Integration and Vice-President of the European Committee of the Polish Council of Ministers. From 31 May 2006 to 16 August 2007 she was also Secretary of State at the Office for European Integration (Polish Minister for European Affairs) and Head of the Committee for European Integration.

In 2006-2007 she was the Polish negotiator (i.e. sherpa) in the preparation of the Treaty of Lisbon.

From 2006 to 2007 she served as Plenipotentiary of the Republic of Poland before the Court of Justice of the EU.

Since September 2007 she has been serving as Vice-Rector of the College of Europe in Natolin, Warsaw.

In 2008 she became a member of the Steering Committee (i.e. the Wise Men Group) of the European Investment Bank (EIB), created by the Council of the European Union to review the EIB external mandate.

Between 2010 and 2016 Ewa Ośniecka-Tamecka was Member of the Council and Vice-President of the Cooperation Fund Foundation.

In 2016-2017, she was Member of the Governing Board of the European Humanities University in Vilnius.

== Awards ==
- Knight of the Order of the Legion of Honour (French Republic), 2006
- Commander of the Order of the Crown (Belgium) (Kingdom of Belgium), 2013
- Commander of the Order of Leopold (Belgium) (Kingdom of Belgium), 2016
- Bene Merito Honorary Distinction (Ministry of Foreign Affairs of the Republic of Poland), 2026

== Bibliography ==
- Marek A. Cichocki, Charles Życzkowski, Institutional Design and Voting Power in the European Union, ISBN 978-0-7546-7754-3, Ashgate Publishing Limited, 2010, pp. 283–292
- Dorota Pietrzyk-Reeves (ed.), The Identity of the Old Continent and the Future of the European Project, ISBN 978-83-89972-94-1, UKIE, Warsaw 2007, pp. 253–258, 310-311
- Poland Will Not Be Alone in the Union (Jacek Pawlicki's interview with Ewa Ośniecka-Tamecka, Head of UKIE), Gazeta Wyborcza, ISSN 0860-908X (5 April 2007), World section, p. 14
- The New System is a Greater Cohesion in the EU (Wojciech Lorenz’s interview with Ewa Ośniecka-Tamecka, Head of UKIE), Rzeczpospolita, ISSN (21 May 2007)
- Ewa Ośniecka-Tamecka, Pierwiastek jest (naj)lepszy, Gazeta Wyborcza, ISSN 0860-908X (22 June 2007)
- Ewa Ośniecka-Tamecka, What kind of European Union does Poland need? All free, all equal, Polski Przegląd Dyplomatyczny (Polish Diplomatic Review) nr 1(67)2016, Polski Instytut Spraw Międzynarodowych (The Polish Institute of International Affairs
