= Nicholas Westcott =

British diplomat

Nicholas Westcott CMG (born 20 July 1956) is a Professor of Practice in the Department of Politics and International Studies at SOAS University of London. Prior to this, he was director of the Royal African Society from 2017-2023. He was formerly a member of Her Majesty's Diplomatic Service, serving as British High Commissioner to Ghana and as managing director for Africa and the Middle East in the European External Action Service. He has also published a number of books and articles on African history and international affairs.

== Early life and education ==
Born in Guildford, Surrey, Westcott attended Epsom College and studied at Sidney Sussex College, Cambridge, from 1974 to 1982, taking a Bachelor of Arts in history and completing a PhD on "The Impact of the Second World War on Tanganyika, 1939–1951".

== Career ==
He joined the British diplomatic service in 1982, serving in the UK Representation to the European Union in Brussels from 1985 to 1989, as the Deputy High Commissioner in Tanzania (1993–1996), and as Minister-Counsellor in the Embassy of the United Kingdom, Washington, D.C. (1999–2002). In the Foreign, Commonwealth and Development Office (then the FCO) Westcott worked as head of the Economic Relations Department (1996–1999), and as chief information officer and head of IT strategy from 2002 to 2007. He was appointed British High Commissioner to Ghana in 2008–2011, and served simultaneously as British Ambassador to Ivory Coast, Burkina Faso, Niger and Togo. In 2011, President Laurent Gbagbo of the Ivory Coast expelled Westcott and Canadian Ambassador Marie Isabelle Massip after their respective governments said they would no longer recognize Gbagbo as President after he lost the 2010 election.

In 2011, he was appointed as the first managing director for Africa in the EU's European External Action Service in Brussels, serving under the first High Representative of the Union for Foreign Affairs and Security Policy, Catherine Ashton. In 2015 he was moved to become Managing Director for the Middle East and North Africa by HRVP Federica Mogherini.

In November 2017, Westcott returned to London to take up the role of director of the Royal African Society, and was appointed a research associate at the Centre for International Studies and Diplomacy as SOAS University of London He was made professor of practice in diplomacy in the Department of Politics in February 2023. He appears regularly in the media on African, Middle Eastern and diplomatic affairs

He also sits on the boards of the African Center for Economic Transformation, based in Accra, Ghana, and the Foreign and Commonwealth Office Collection at King's College London. He is a Fellow of the Royal Geographical Society and the Royal Historical Society, and a member of Chatham House. He was made a Companion of the Order of St Michael and St George in 1998.

== Family ==
Westcott was married for 30 years to Miriam Pearson (died 2018). They have one daughter and one son.

== Publications ==
- "The Impact of the Second World War on Tanganyika, 1939–49" in D. Killingray and R. Rathbone (ed.), Africa and the Second World War (1986), ISBN 0-333-38258-7
- Managed Economies in World War II, with P. Kingston and R. G. Tiedemann (1991), ISBN 0728601893
- Digital Diplomacy: the Impact of the Internet on International Relations, (2008)
- Responding to Conflict and Promoting Stability: European Policy in the Middle East and North Africa (2017)
- "The Trump Administration's Africa policy" (2019), African Affairs
- Imperialism and Development: the East African Groundnut Scheme and its legacy (2020), ISBN 978-1-84701-259-3
- How to be a Diplomat (2025), ISBN 978-1-032-87584-2
