= Richard Dowden =

English journalist (born 1949)

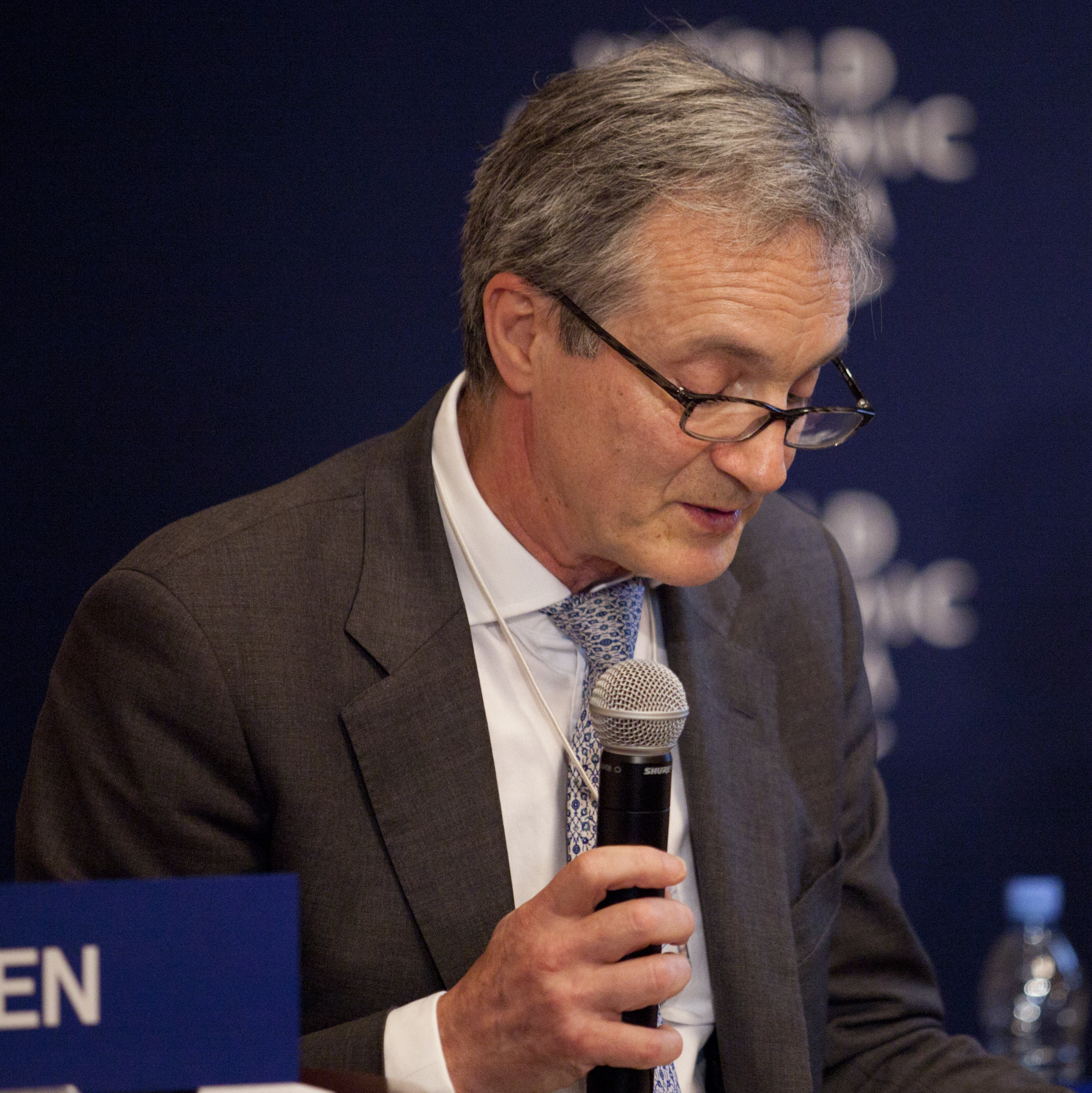
- Dowden in 2012
- Born: March 20, 1949 (age 76); Surrey, England
- Occupation: Journalist
- Works: Africa: Altered States, Ordinary Miracles (2008)
- Website: dowdenafrica.com

Richard Dowden (born 20 March 1949) is an English journalist who has specialised in African issues. Since 1975, he has worked for several British media and was formerly Executive Director of the Royal African Society (2002–2017). He is the author of the book Africa: Altered States, Ordinary Miracles (Portobello Books, 2008), which has a foreword by the Nigerian writer Chinua Achebe. Dowden lives and works in London.

== Journalism ==
Born on 29 March 1949 in Surrey, England, Richard Dowden read History at Bedford College, London University (1967–70). He first went to Africa in 1971 and worked as a volunteer teacher in a rural part of Uganda, until the end of 1972, when he left the country because of Idi Amin's dictatorship. In Dowden's words, in December 1972: "Amin declared all whites in our area to be spies who had uniforms and guns hidden in their houses. It was time to go."

On his return to Great Britain, Dowden worked from 1973 to 1975 for the Catholic Justice and Peace Commission, mainly in Northern Ireland, before he turned to journalism; from 1976 he was employed by The Catholic Herald, where he served as Editor from 1977 to 1979. He went on to join the foreign desk of The Times in 1980, and began to travel to Africa and the Middle East until 1986, when he was appointed Africa Editor at the newly-established newspaper The Independent. Working in this role until 1995, he became Diplomatic Editor of The Independent in 1996, then moved to The Economist as Africa Editor (1996–2002). He has visited and written about almost every country in sub-Saharan Africa.

Dowden's book Africa: Altered States, Ordinary Miracles, first published in 2008 by Portobello Books, is an overview of African contemporary history from an autobiographical point of view. As underlined by African Affairs, the top-ranked Africanist journal, the book can be considered between an academic and a popular text, allowing the reader to become interested in the subject even if they are not Africa experts. As Chinua Achebe explained in a foreword to Dowden's book:

"Africa is a vast continent, a continent of people, […]. In Africa: Altered States, Ordinary Miracles, it is clear that Richard Dowden understands this, and one could not ask for a more qualified author to explore Africa's complexity."

== Royal African Society Executive Director ==
From 2002 to 2017, Dowden was Executive Director at the Royal African Society (RAS), an association founded in 1901 to promote relations and a better understanding between Africa and Great Britain. He is on the Editorial Board of African Affairs, journal of the RAS, and together with Alex de Waal coordinates African Arguments, a series of short books and a blog about Africa today. Dowden also promoted the creation of Africa Writes and Film Africa, as well as helping to establish the Africa All-Party Parliamentary Group at Westminster in collaboration with Hugh Bayley, MP for York. Dowden also lectures on Africa and its place in the world and he writes a regular blog commenting on contemporary African affairs on the website of the Royal African Society.
