= Razia Khan (economist) =

Botswana economist

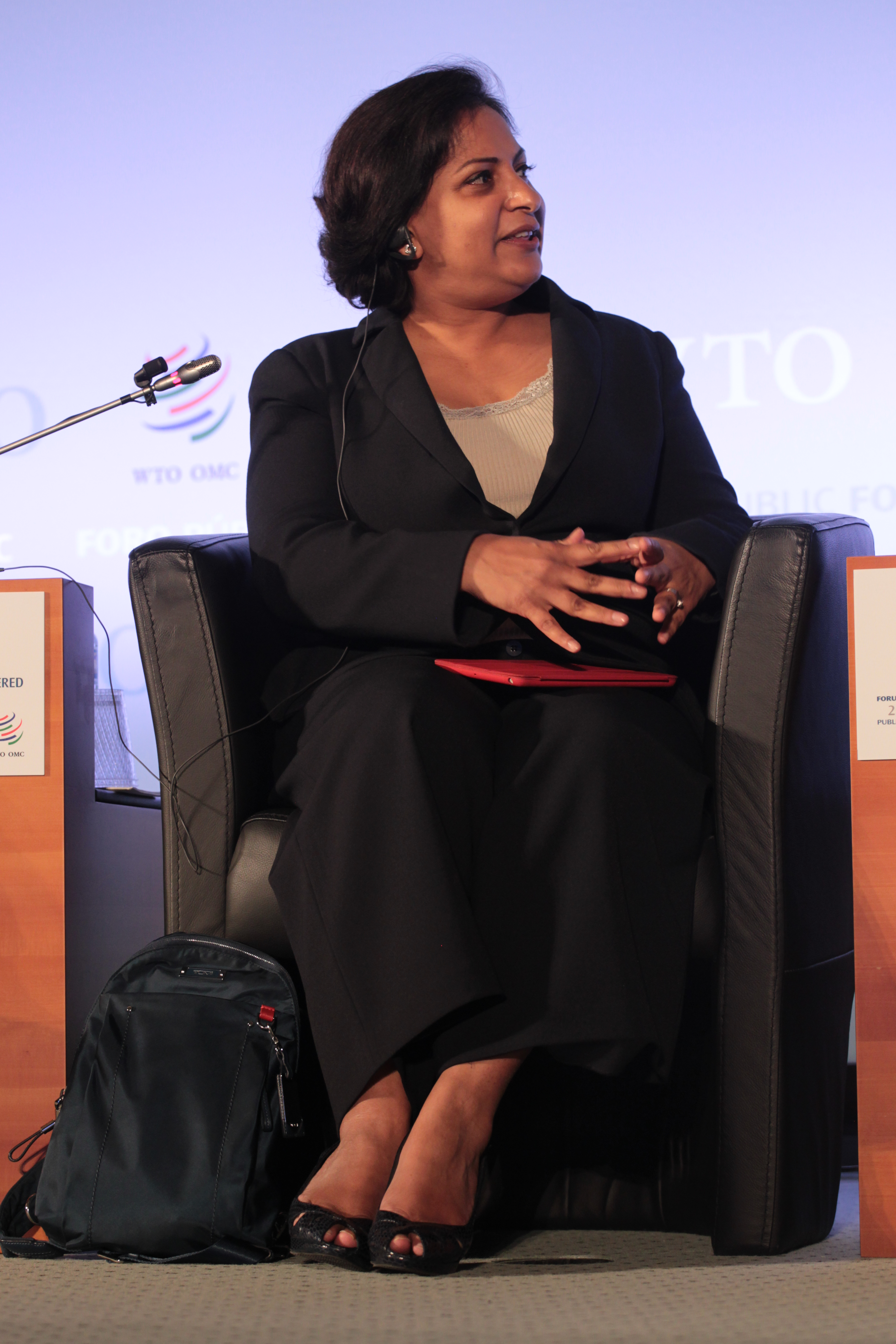
Razia Khan at the WTO in 2014

Razia Khan is a banker and economist from Botswana.

== Career ==
Razia Khan was born in Botswana and has Bachelor of Science and Master of Science degrees from the London School of Economics. She joined British bank Standard Chartered in 1997 as a member of their corporate sales team before moving into a role where she researched African foreign exchange markets.

Khan is now Standard Chartered's chief economist for Africa She works for the bank's Africa regional office and also their wholesale bank. Khan provides analysis on the economies of African nations for the bank's internal executive committees and its customers. She has advised the United States Department of the Treasury, Federal Reserve Bank of New York, African Development Bank and many African central banks. She has also advised non-governmental organisations, trading funds and has provided analysis for CNN, the BBC and CNBC.

Khan sits on the World Economic Forum's councils for poverty and development; population; and migration. She is a member of the Royal African Society's advisory board and was named as one of the "100 most influential Africans in 2015" by New African magazine.
