= Federica Mogherini =

Italian politician (born 1973)

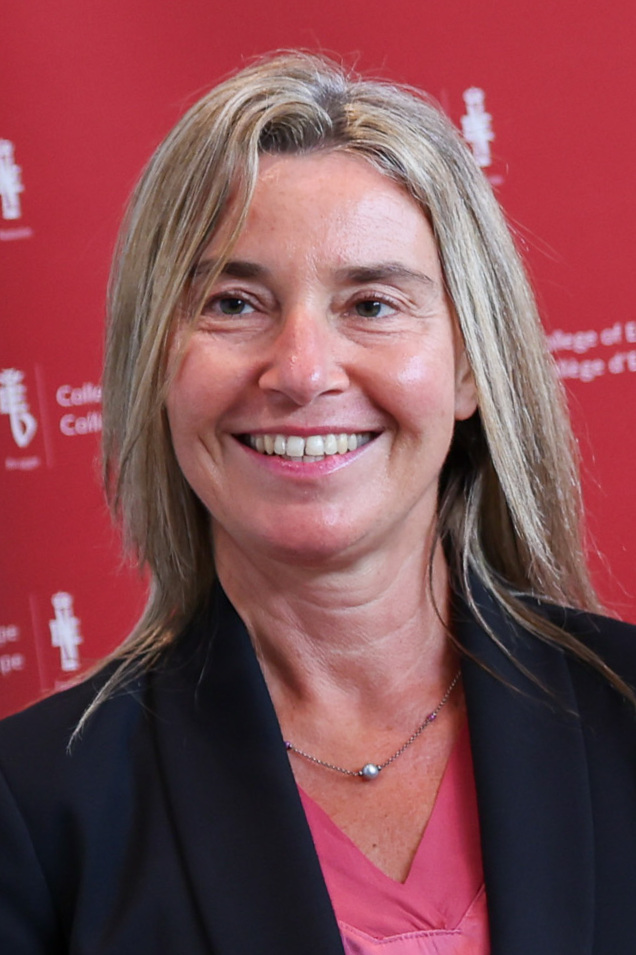
- Mogherini in 2024

Rector of the College of Europe
- In office 1 September 2020 – 12 December 2025
- Preceded by: Jörg Monar
- Succeeded by: Ewa Ośniecka-Tamecka (acting)

High Representative of the European Union for Foreign Affairs and Security Policy
- In office 1 November 2014 – 30 November 2019
- Preceded by: Catherine Ashton
- Succeeded by: Josep Borrell

Vice-President of the European Commission
- In office 1 November 2014 – 30 November 2019
- Commission: Juncker
- Succeeded by: Josep Borrell

Minister of Foreign Affairs
- In office 22 February 2014 – 31 October 2014
- Prime Minister: Matteo Renzi
- Preceded by: Emma Bonino
- Succeeded by: Paolo Gentiloni

Member of the Chamber of Deputies
- In office 13 May 2008 – 30 October 2014
- Constituency: Lazio 1

Personal details
- Born: Federica Maria Mogherini; 16 June 1973 (age 53) Rome, Italy
- Party: PD (since 2007); DS (1998–2007); PDS (1991–1998); PCI (1988–1991)
- Other political affiliations: PES (since 2014); S&D (since 2014)
- Spouse: Matteo Rebesani (m. 2007; div. 2017)
- Children: 2
- Parent: Flavio Mogherini (father)
- Education: Sapienza University of Rome

Federica Mogherini (Italian: [fedeˈriːka moɡeˈriːni]; born 16 June 1973) is an Italian politician who served as High Representative of the Union for Foreign Affairs and Security Policy and Vice-President of the European Commission from 2014 to 2019. She is a member of the Democratic Party (PD), which is part of the Party of European Socialists. She previously served as Italy's Minister for Foreign Affairs and International Cooperation from February to October 2014 in the Renzi government. She was a member of the Chamber of Deputies (MP) from 2008 to 2014. In 2020, she was appointed rector of the College of Europe, a post-graduate university for European studies in Bruges (Belgium), Natolin (Poland), and Tirana (Albania). In December 2025, following her arrest and subsequent release by the EPPO, she resigned from this position.

== Early life and education ==
Mogherini was born on 16 June 1973 in Rome to the family of the film director and set designer Flavio Mogherini (1922–1994). Mogherini attended the Sapienza University of Rome where she studied political science graduating with a specialization in political philosophy with a final dissertation on Islam and politics, which she wrote while she was on the Erasmus programme at Sciences Po Aix in Aix-en-Provence, France.

== Political career ==
=== Early beginnings ===
From 1988, Mogherini was a member of the Italian Communist Youth Federation (FGCI). In 1996, she joined the Youth Left after the dissolution of the Italian Communist Party (PCI) and its transformation into the Democratic Party of the Left (PDS). In 2001, she became a member of the National Council of the Democrats of the Left (DS), later serving on its National Executive Board and Political Committee.

In 2003, Mogherini started working at the DS's Foreign Affairs Section, where she was given responsibility for relations with international movements and parties, later becoming the team's coordinator; after that she was given responsibility for Foreign Affairs and International Relations on the staff of DS Party chairman Piero Fassino. In this role, she oversaw the policies on Afghanistan and Iraq, as well as the Middle East peace process. Mogherini was in charge of maintaining relations with the Party of European Socialists (PES), the Socialist International (SI), and other left-wing parties. After the formation of the Italian Democratic Party (PD) in 2007, Mogherini was appointed to its executive committee by its founding chairman Walter Veltroni.

=== Member of Parliament, 2008–2014 ===
In 2008, Mogherini was elected to Italy's Chamber of Deputies, representing the constituency of Veneto. Serving in the 16th legislature, she became secretary of its Defence Committee, a member of the Italian parliamentary delegation to the Council of Europe, and of Italy's parliamentary delegation to the Western European Union. On 24 February 2009, she was appointed to the staff of the incoming PD leader Dario Franceschini, with responsibility for equal opportunity. After that, she was notable as a member of Franceschini's faction (Area Democratica). She also served as vice-president of the Italy-USA Foundation.

In February 2013, Mogherini was returned to parliament for the Emilia-Romagna constituency. During the 17th Italian legislature, she served again on the Defence Committee (replacing Lapo Pistelli after he was appointed Vice-Minister for Foreign Affairs), the Committee on Foreign Affairs, and the Italian delegation to the Parliamentary Assembly of NATO, and later its president from April 2013. On 1 August 2013, she was elected as head of the Italian delegation to the Parliamentary Assembly for NATO.

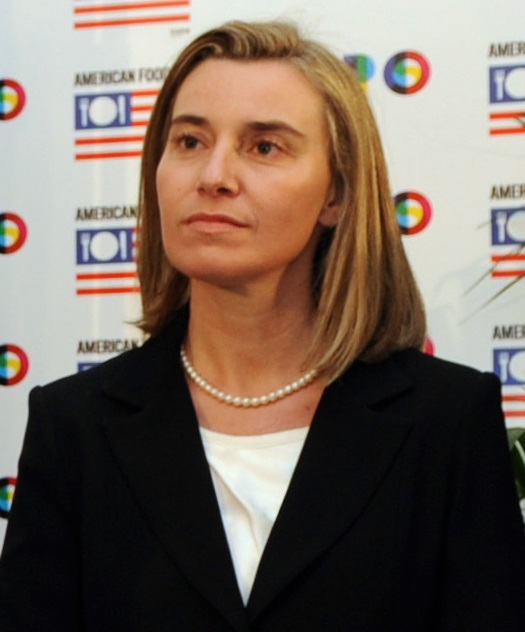
Mogherini in 2014

On 9 December 2013, Matteo Renzi, the new PD leader, appointed Mogherini to his staff, with the responsibility of European relations. Around this time, Mogherini voiced her support for the Campaign for the Establishment of a United Nations Parliamentary Assembly, an organization that campaigns for democratic reformation of the United Nations, and the creation of a more accountable international political system. Mogherini was also a Fellow of the German Marshall Fund of the United States in 2007.

=== Minister of Foreign Affairs of Italy, 2014 ===
Mogherini joined the Renzi Cabinet as Minister of Foreign Affairs, the third woman after Susanna Agnelli and Emma Bonino to hold this post. Her first public engagement following her appointment was to meet, along with Italy's Defence Minister, the wives of Massimiliano Latorre and Salvatore Girone, the two Italian marines detained in India after the Enrica Lexie incident. Under her direction, the Foreign Ministry worked for the release of Mariam Ibrahim. Italy's good relations with Sudan helped in securing the release of this Sudanese woman who was finally permitted to fly to Italy on an Italian government plane.

In July 2014, Mogherini expressed support for Israel's right to defend itself during the 2014 Israel–Gaza conflict. She stated: "The repeated rocket strikes on Israel warrant the firmest possible condemnation; all attacks on civilian areas must stop immediately."

== European Union High Representative, 2014–2019 ==
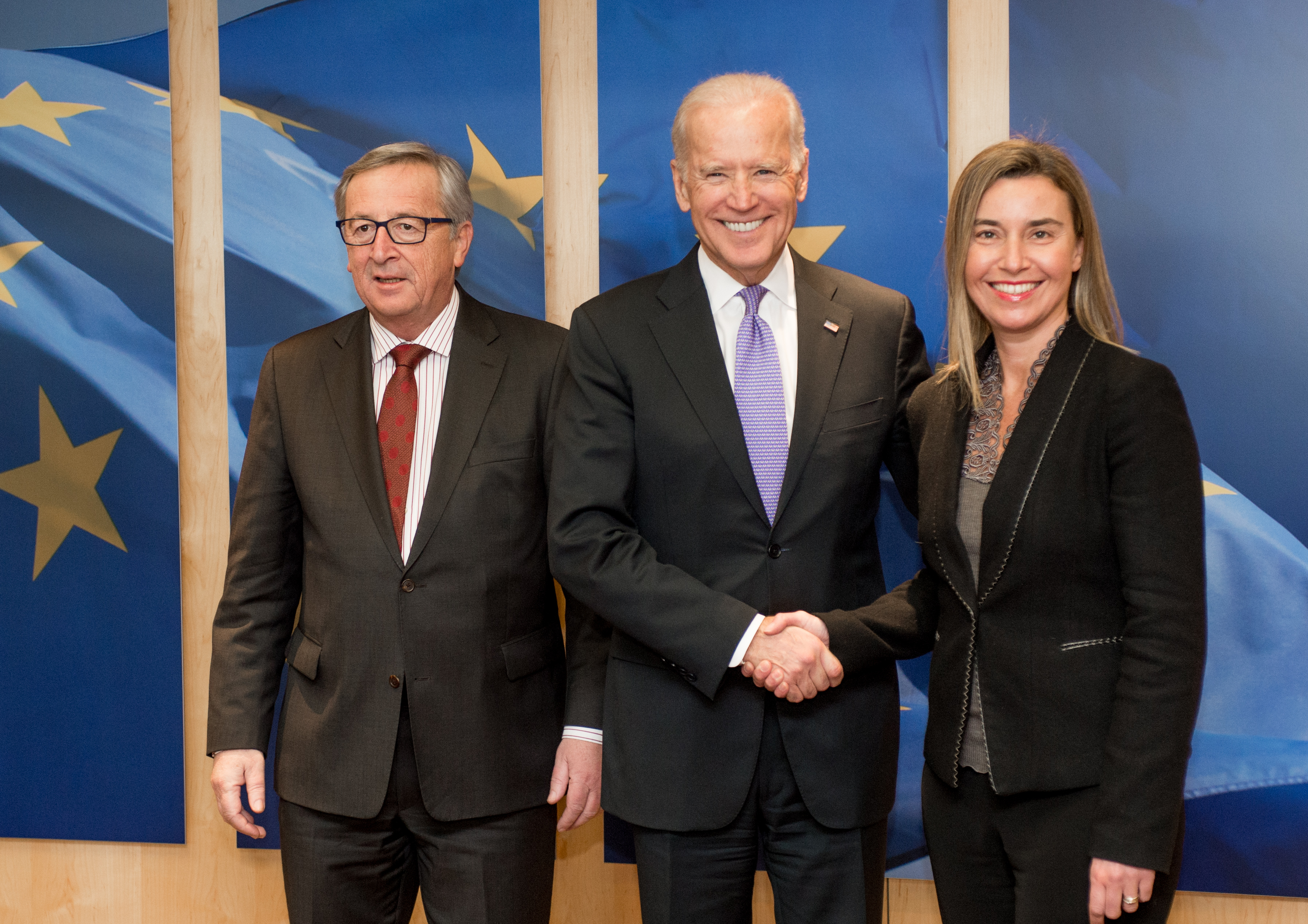
Mogherini with U.S. Vice President Joe Biden and President of the European Commission Jean-Claude Juncker on 2 June 2015

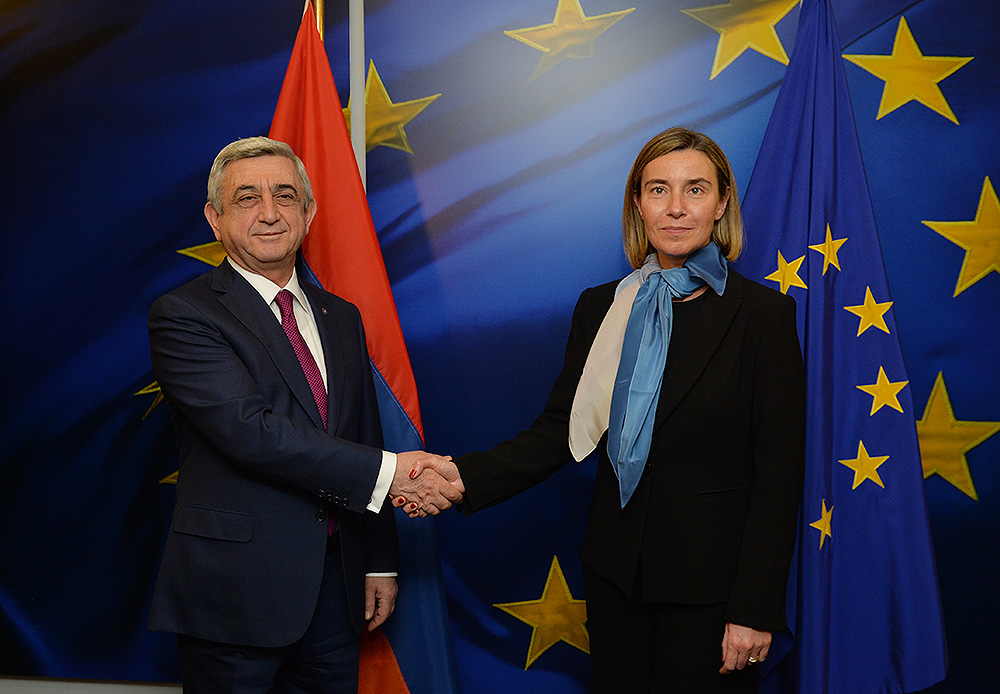
Mogherini with Armenian president Serzh Sargsyan on 28 February 2017

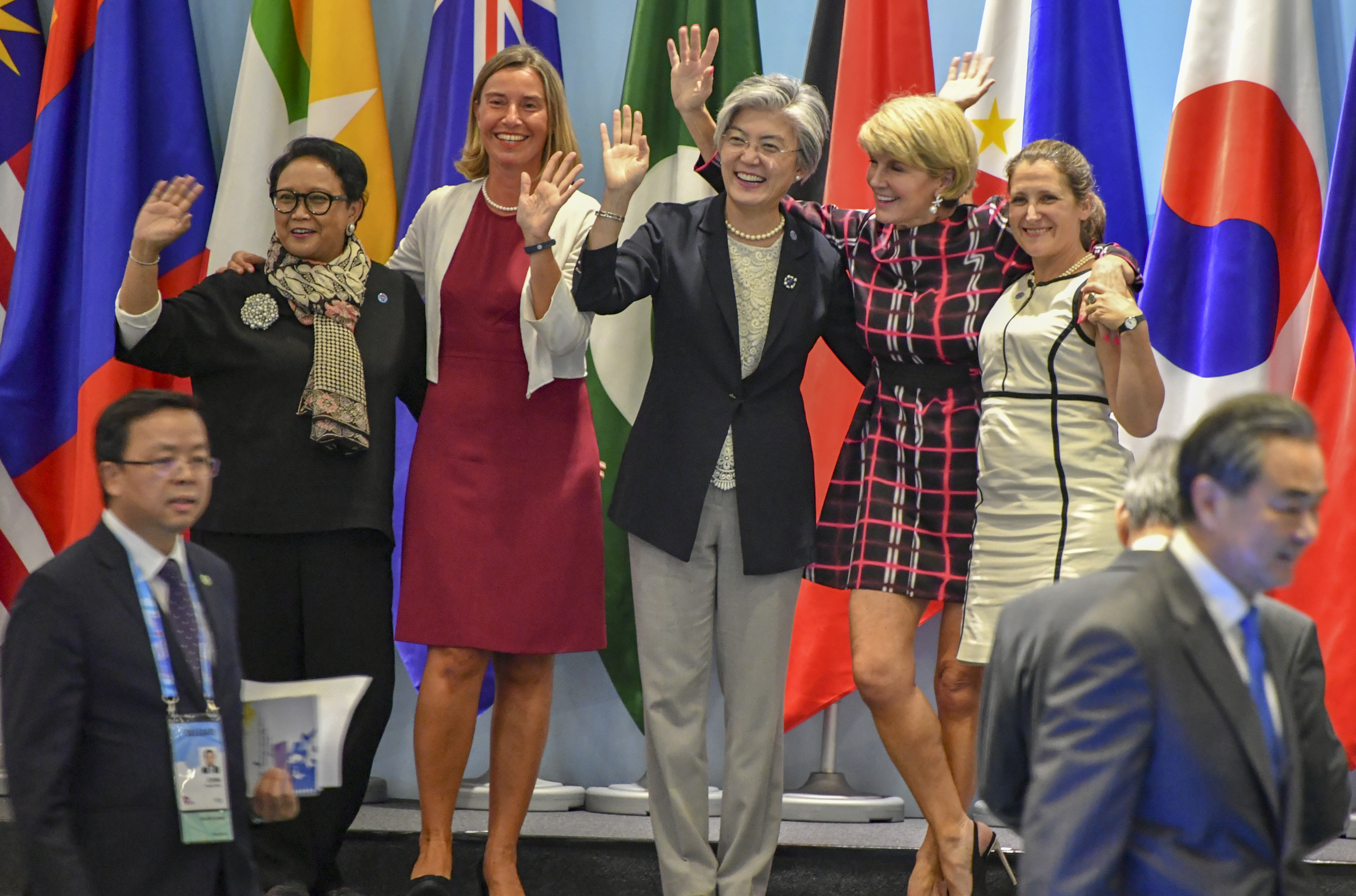
Mogherini with Retno Marsudi, Kang Kyung-wha, Julie Bishop, and Chrystia Freeland at the ASEAN Regional Forum Retreat in Singapore on 4 August 2018

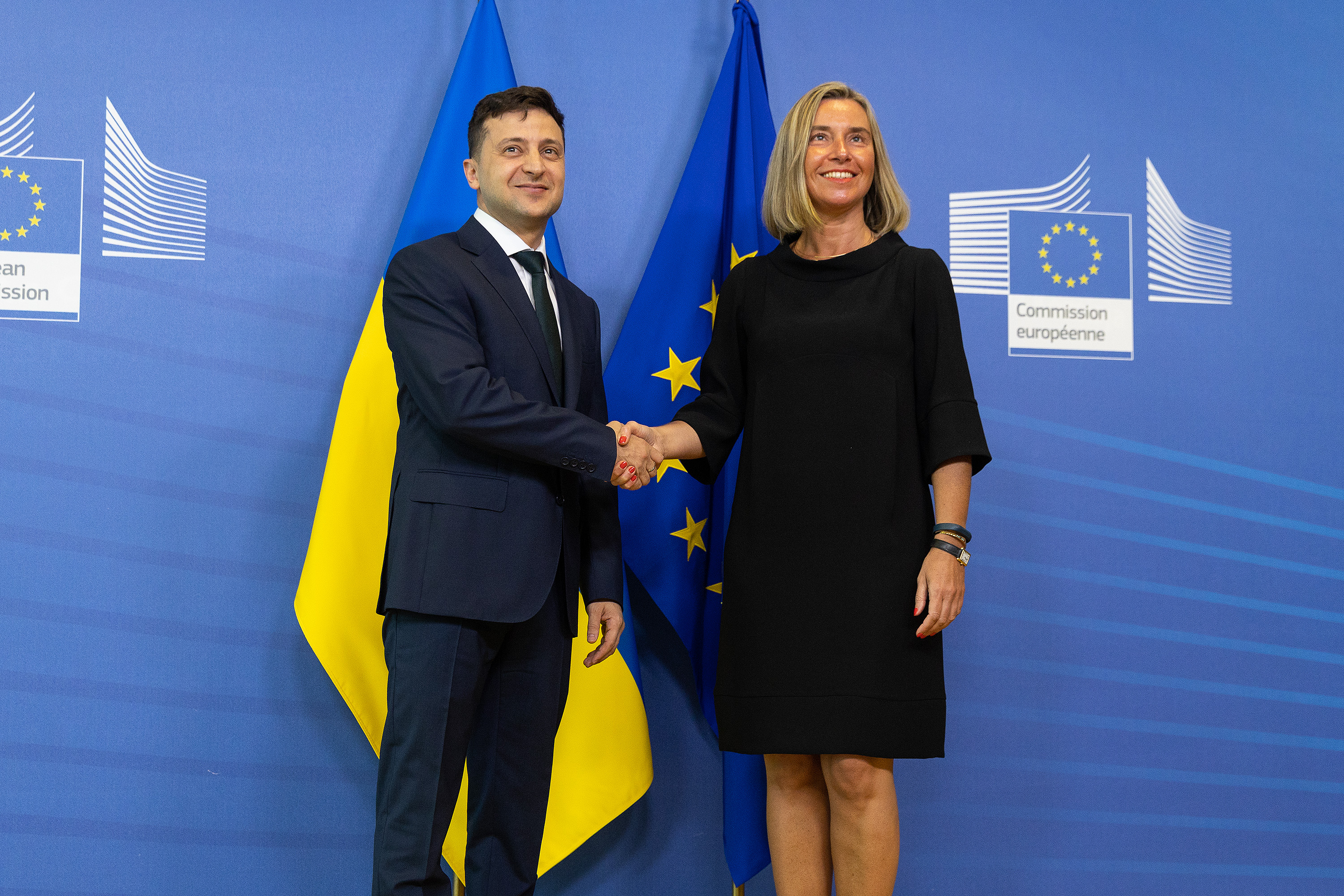
Mogherini with Ukrainian president Volodymyr Zelenskyy on 5 June 2019

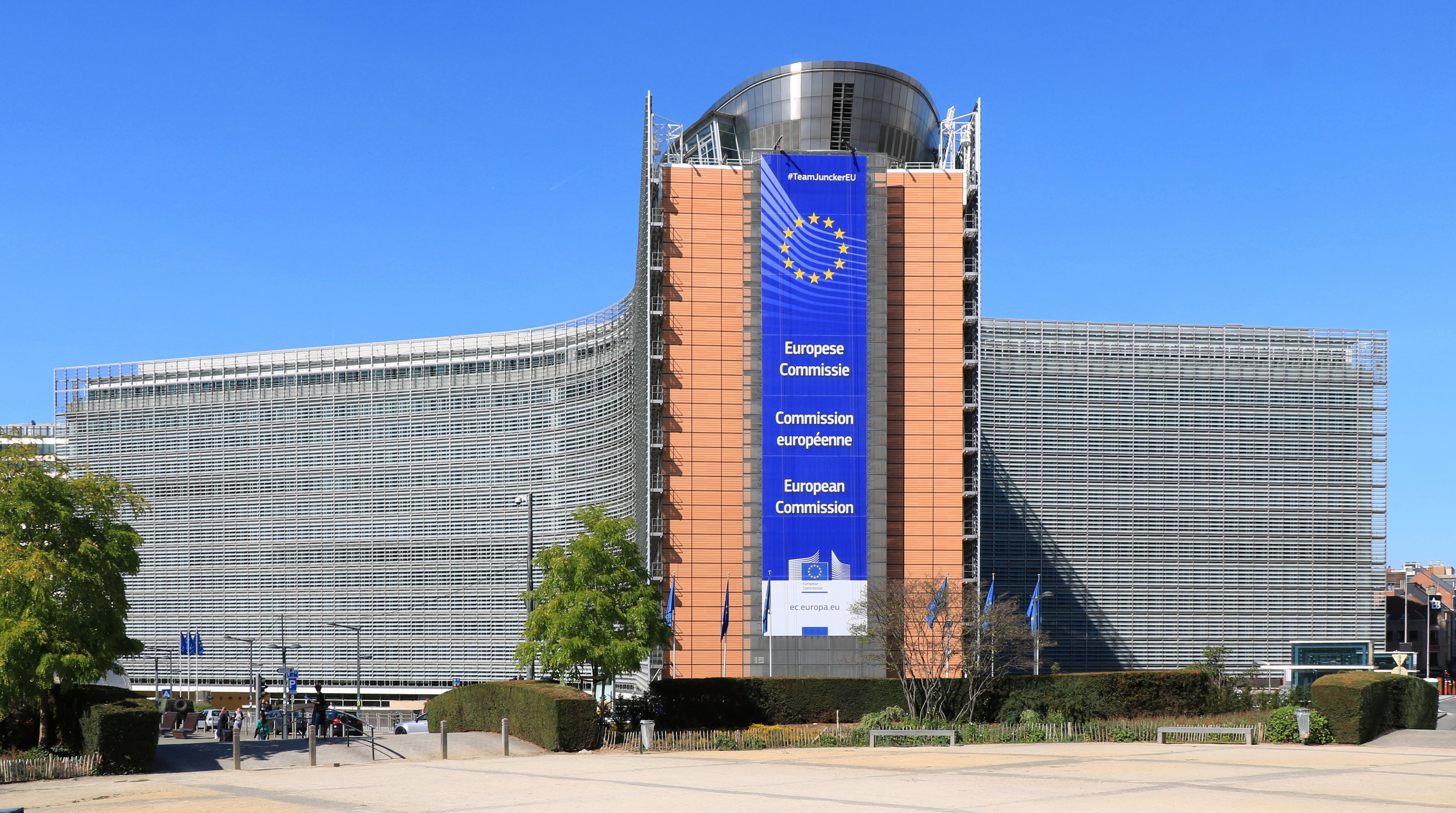
The headquarters of the European Commission, of which Mogherini was Vice-President from 2014 to 2019

In July 2014, given the large number of Italian MEPs belonging to the S&D Group following the 2014 European Parliament election, the European Council considered her as a candidate for the position of High Representative of the European Union for Foreign Affairs and Security Policy in Jean-Claude Juncker's new European Commission. On 13 July 2014, the Financial Times among other European newspapers reported that her nomination proposal had been opposed by the Baltic states and several Central-European countries, including Latvia, Estonia, Lithuania, and Poland, where her stance towards Russia concerning the Russo-Ukrainian war was considered to be too soft. Sweden, Ireland, Netherlands, and the United Kingdom also raised concerns, claiming the position should be filled by someone from the center-right and by a candidate from outside Germany, France, and Italy. On 1 August 2014, Italian prime minister Matteo Renzi formally nominated her by letter to Juncker, the European Commission president-elect, as Italy's official candidate for Commissioner.

On 30 August 2014, Europe's socialist prime ministers met prior to the convening of the European Council, at which she received the approval of the Party of European Socialists (PES). On the same day, the president Herman Van Rompuy announced that the European Council had decided to appoint Mogherini as its new High Representative, effective from 1 November 2014. The group of commissioners involved in external relations—neighborhood and EU enlargement, trade, development, emergency and humanitarian aid, migration, energy, and transport—meets monthly, with Mogherini in the chair.

At her first press conference, Mogherini declared her efforts would be devoted to establishing discussions between Russia and Ukraine to solve the war between the two countries. In 2015, Mogherini won praise for her role in negotiating the Joint Comprehensive Plan of Action (JCPOA), an international agreement on the nuclear program of Iran, and along with Iranian Foreign Minister Mohammad Javad Zarif was the one to announce the accord to the world. In 2016, she appointed chief negotiator Helga Schmid as Secretary General of the European External Action Service (EEAS), following the resignation of Alain Le Roy. Since 2015, Mogherini also began serving as a member of the European Commission's High-level Group of Personalities on Defence Research chaired by Elżbieta Bieńkowska.

=== 2016 Global Strategy ===
In 2016, the European Union adopted the European Union Global Strategy, drawn up by Mogherini, thereby replacing the 2003 European Security Strategy.

=== 2017 visit to India ===
In April 2017, Mogherini paid her first visit to India in an official capacity as European Union representative, discussing issues including climate change and anti-terrorism.

=== 2017 JCPOA talks ===
In October 2017, Mogherini announced plans to argue the European Union case for the United States to remain supportive of the JCPOA, the Iran nuclear deal, by holding talks with the Trump administration in Washington following Donald Trump's denial of recertification.

== Later career ==
In 2019, United Nations Secretary-General António Guterres appointed Mogherini as co-chair of the High Level-Panel on Internal Displacement, alongside Donald Kaberuka. In April 2020, she gave notice of her intention to apply for the position of rector of the College of Europe. The French newspaper Libération criticized this decision because Mogherini did not have the academic qualifications needed for the job. According to the newspaper, there was a conflict of interests in this matter, as the College of Europe is funded at 50% by the European Commission. Mogherini became rector on 1 September 2020.

=== European External Action Service controversy ===
Mogherini was temporarily detained for questioning by Belgian police as part of an anti-fraud investigation led by the European Public Prosecutor's Office on 2 December 2025. The probe is centered on suspected procurement fraud, corruption, and conflict of interest related to an EU-funded project—the European Diplomatic Academy training program—which was awarded to the College of Europe between 2021 and 2022, where Mogherini serves as the Rector. The following day, the EPPO stated that Mogherini, as well as two other suspects, were formally notified of the accusations against them, namely procurement fraud and corruption, conflict of interest and violation of professional secrecy. On 4 December, Mogherini announced her resignation as rector of the College of Europe and director of the diplomatic training program. Her resignation took effect on 12 December.

== Political positions ==
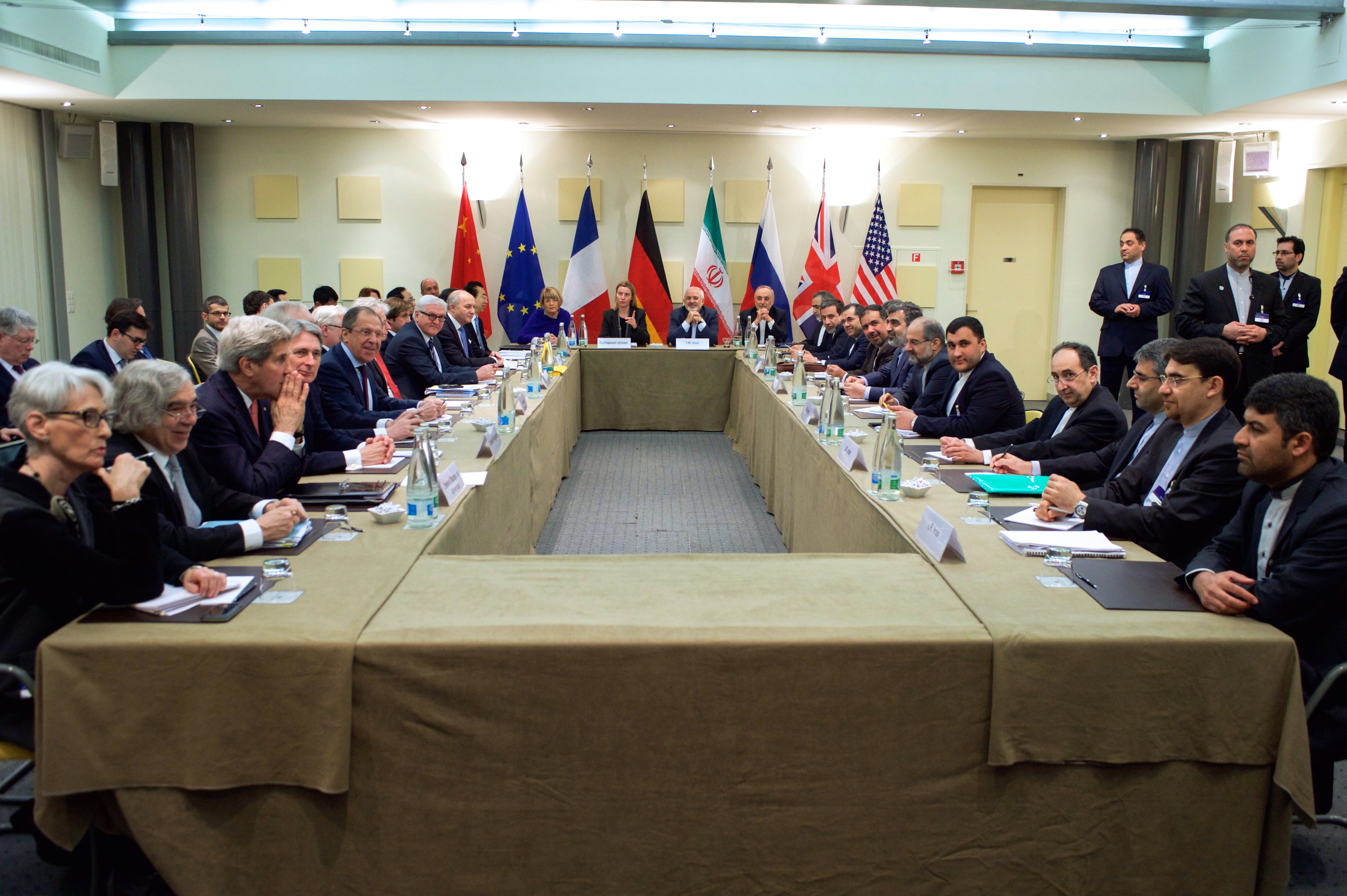
Mogherini with the ministers of foreign affairs of the United States, the United Kingdom, Russia, Germany, France, China, and Iran negotiating in Lausanne for the Joint Comprehensive Plan of Action

=== Relations with North African countries ===
In 2017, Mogherini stirred controversy over her statement that the trade agreements between Morocco and the European Union (EU) would not be affected by the 2016 ruling by the European Court of Justice on the scope of trade with Morocco. This ruling confirmed that bilateral trade deals, such as the EU–Morocco Fisheries Partnership Agreement, cover only agricultural produce and fishing products originating within the internationally recognized borders of Morocco, thus explicitly excluding any product sourced from Western Sahara or its territorial waters. In regards to the political status of Western Sahara, the international community, including the European Union, unanimously rejects Morocco's territorial claim to Western Sahara.

=== Relations with Iran ===
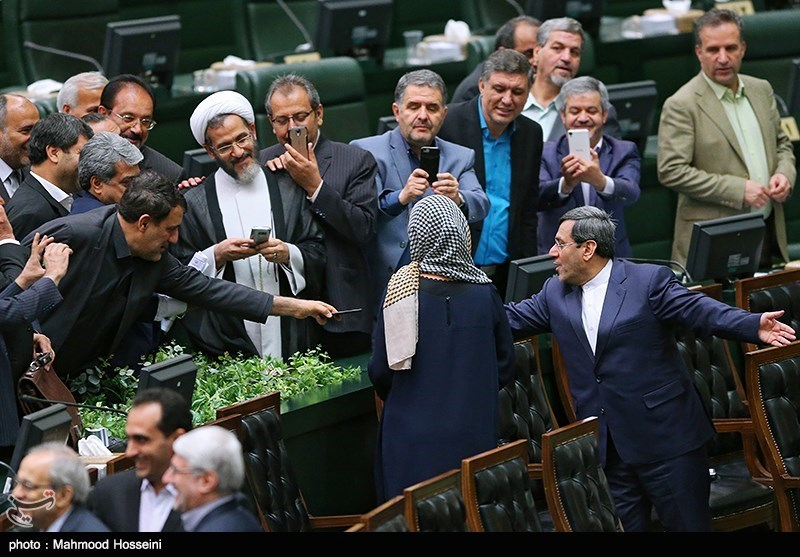
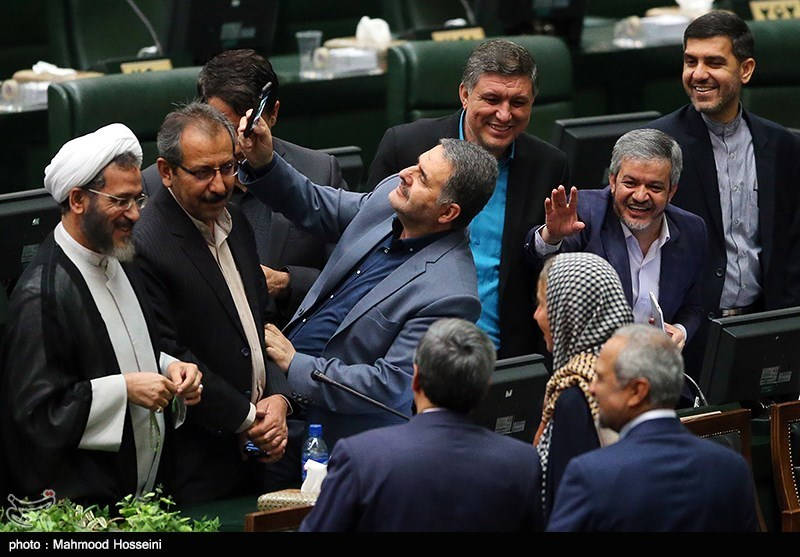
Iranian members of parliament taking selfies with Mogherini, 2017

Speaking at a briefing with New Zealand's Foreign Minister Winston Peters on the first ever European Union high-representative official visit, Mogherini challenged U.S. sanctions on Iran, stating that the European Union is encouraging small and medium size enterprises in particular to increase business with and in Iran as part of something that is for the European Union a "Security Priority".

=== Relations with the Middle East ===
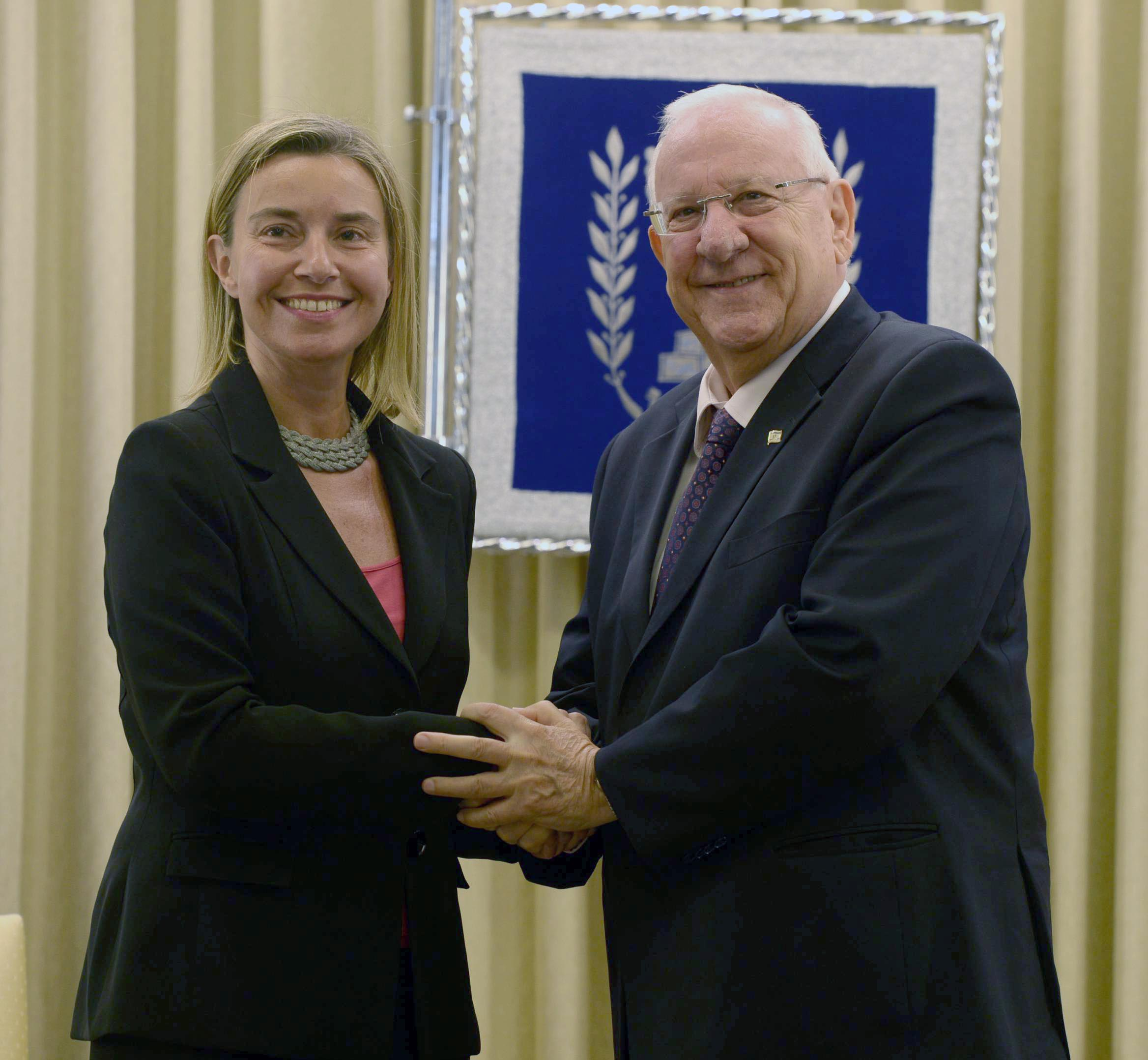
Mogherini with Israeli president Reuven Rivlin on 21 May 2015

Mogherini expressed that she wants the European Union to play a leading role in trying to restart Israeli-Palestinian peace talks after a U.S.-brokered process foundered in April 2014. She visited the region within days of starting her new job. She pushed to revitalise the Middle East Quartet, together with the United Nations (UN), the United States, and Russia, and to involve key Arab countries in relaunching the peace process: the first "Quartet plus" meeting, with Egypt, Jordan, Saudi Arabia, and the Arab League, took place on the sides of the UN General Assembly in New York on 30 September 2014. In her capacity as European Union High Representative, she coordinated the last rounds of negotiations on Iran's nuclear programme, which led to an agreement on 14 July 2015. U.S. Secretary of State John Kerry praised her for "expertly coordinating international efforts during the final stage" of the talks.

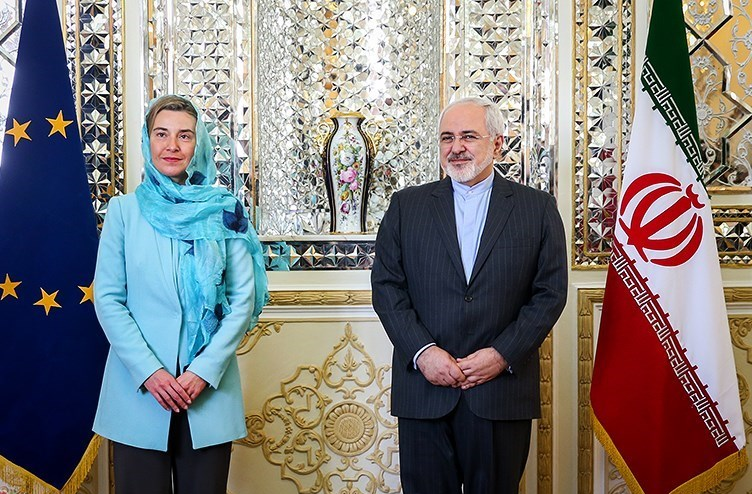
Mogherini with Iranian foreign minister Mohammad Javad Zarif on 16 April 2016

Mogherini opposed the Saudi Arabian-led intervention in Yemen. She said: "I'm convinced that military action is not a solution." Mogherini opposed the United States recognition of Jerusalem as capital of Israel under U.S. president Donald Trump. On 19 March 2018, in response to the Turkish invasion of northern Syria, Mogherini criticized Turkey, saying that international efforts in Syria are supposed to be "aiming at de-escalating the military activities and not escalating them". Mogherini issued a declaration on behalf of the European Union on 9 October 2019 stating: "In light of the Turkish military operation in north-east Syria, the EU reaffirms that a sustainable solution to the Syrian conflict cannot be achieved militarily."

=== Relations with Russia ===
In January 2015, Mogherini circulated a discussion paper among members of the Foreigns Affairs Council exploring a potential rapprochement with Russia, including a pathway to ease some sanctions against Russia after the start of the Russo-Ukrainian War and opening dialogue on a range of topics like visas and energy policy; the proposal drew a harsh response from the United Kingdom and Poland as the fighting intensified in eastern Ukraine.

In February 2017, Mogherini said that "as long as the Minsk agreements are not fully implemented, [anti-Russian] sanctions would remain in place". In March 2017, dozens of journalists, analysts, and politicians signed an open letter, initiated by Czech non-governmental organization European Values think thank, criticizing Mogherini's response to Russia, saying she was "trying to avoid naming Russia as the main creator of hostile disinformation" and "constantly [appeasing] Russian aggression." On 27 April 2017, on her first official visit to Russia, Mogherini met with Sergei Lavrov. Their discussion covered the implementation of the Minsk Agreement, the annexation of Crimea by the Russian Federation, homophobic discrimination in Chechnya, and other topics. Mogherini said that she supported policies in the spirit of "cooperation rather than confrontation".

=== Relations with the United States ===
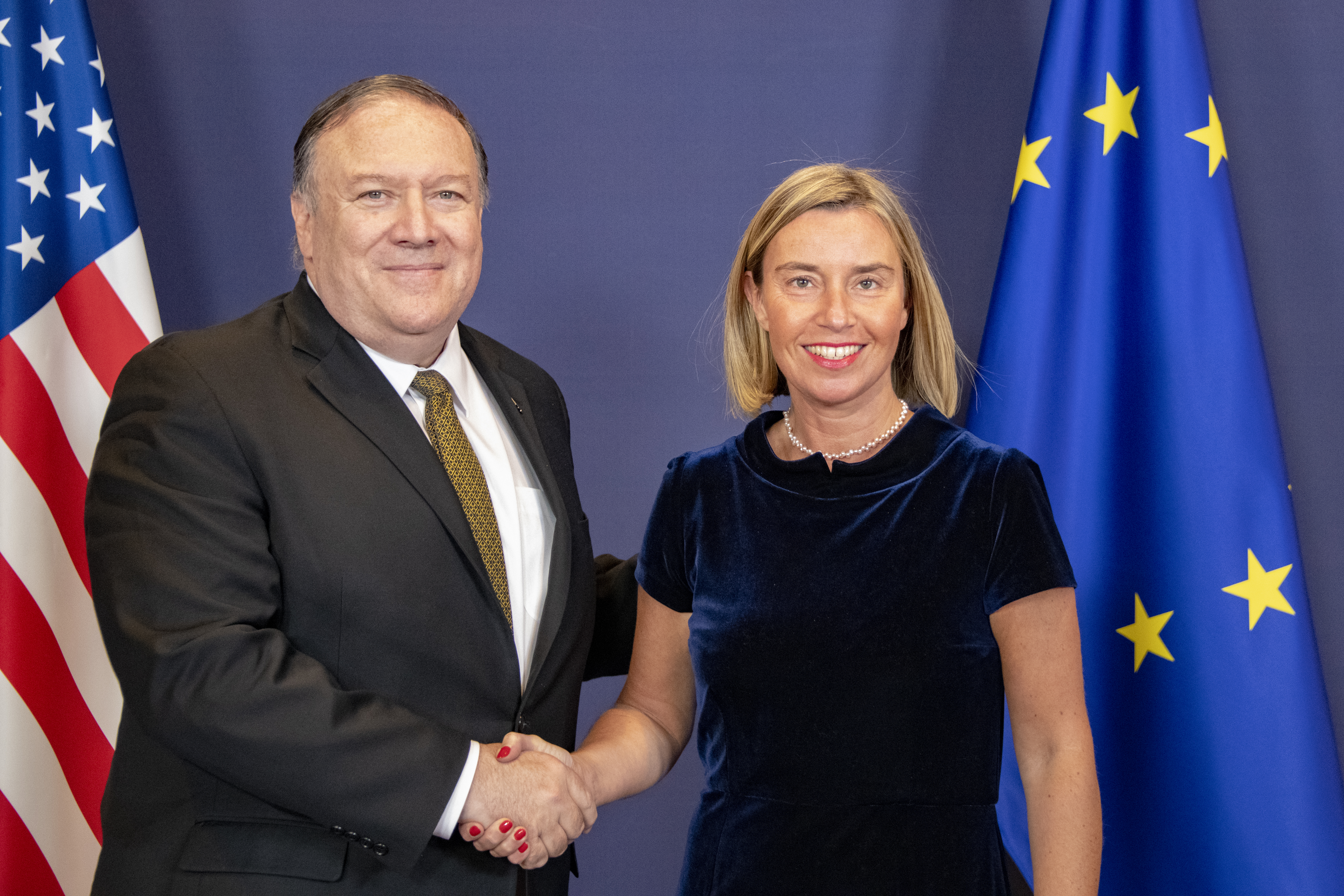
Mogherini with U.S. Secretary of State Mike Pompeo on 13 May 2019

An admirer of the United States, Mogherini told Reuters in 2014 that one day she would like to work there. In the negotiations on a Transatlantic Trade and Investment Partnership, she pushed for an energy chapter, arguing that it would "set a benchmark" in terms of transparent, rules-based energy markets to the rest of the world. Following the election of Donald Trump as U.S. president and his support of Brexit, Mogherini criticized Trump for interfering in internal European matters. She said: "We do not interfere in US politics ... and Europeans expect that America does not interfere in European politics."

In June 2018, Mogherini issued the statement that the European Union praised the 2018 North Korea–United States summit between Trump and North Korean leader Kim Jong-un. She said that it is "crucial and necessary step" for denuclearization of the Korean peninsula, and that the European Union would be ready to "facilitate and support the follow-on negotiations and other steps" for a peace settlement.

=== Relations with Central Asia ===
Mogherini advocated for a stronger partnership between the European Union and Central Asia. On 7 July 2019, she presented the new European Union Strategy for Central Asia during the 15th EU-Central Asia Ministerial Meeting in Kyrgyz capital Bishkek. On the same day, she was awarded Kazakhstan's Order Dostyk of the First Degree for her personal contribution to the development of friendly relations between Kazakhstan and the European Union.

=== Islam in Europe ===
Since her appointment to the European Commission, Mogherini stated that Islam is part of Europe's history and future. In a speech in Brussels on 24 June 2015, she said that "Islam holds a place in our Western societies. Islam belongs in Europe. It holds a place in Europe's history, in our culture, in our food and—what matters most—in Europe's present and future. Like it or not, this is the reality." She added: "I am not afraid to say that political Islam should be part of the picture. Religion plays a role in politics – not always for good, not always for bad. Religion can be part of the process. What makes the difference is whether the process is democratic or not." Some analysts argue that Mogherini's speech was misquoted. For example, according to columnist Klaus Jurgens, Mogherini believes that "political Islam should be part of the equation in fighting terror and in particular the Islamic State in Iraq and the Levant" and "she did not say that political Islam should become Europe's new masterplan".

== Other activities ==
- Africa Europe Foundation (AEF), member of the High-Level Group of Personalities on Africa-Europe Relations (since 2020)
- Friends of Europe, member of the Board of Trustees (since 2020)
- International Crisis Group (ICG), member of the Board of Trustees (since 2019)
- Istituto Affari Internazionali (IAI), member
- Generation Unlimited, member of the Board (since 2018)
- Fight Impunity, member of the Honorary Board (–2022)
- German Marshall Fund, fellow
- European Leadership Network (ELN), member
- Preparatory Commission for the Comprehensive Nuclear-Test-Ban Treaty Organization, member of the Group of Eminent Persons
- Munich Security Conference, member of the Advisory Council

== Recognition ==
- Hessian Peace Prize, 2017
- Kaiser Otto Prize, 2017
- Honorary doctorate at the University of Tampere, 2018
- Order of the Rising Sun, 2nd Class, Gold and Silver Star, 2023

== See also ==
- List of current foreign ministers
- List of foreign ministers in 2017

Political offices
Preceded by Emma Bonino	Minister of Foreign Affairs; 2014–2019	Succeeded by Paolo Gentiloni
Preceded by Fernando Nelli Feroci	Italian European Commissioner; 2014–present	Succeeded by Paolo Gentiloni
Preceded by Cathy Ashton	High Representative of the European Union for Foreign Affairs and Security Policy; 2014–2019	Succeeded by Josep Borrell
