= IERI =

International relations research center in Brussels, Belgium

Coordinates: 50.845188°N 4.382666°E

Institut Européen des relations internationales
- Established: 1997
- President: Irnerio Seminatore
- Location: Brussels, Belgium
- Website: http://www.ieri.be

The European Institute of International Relations (Institut Européen des Relations Internationales IERI) is an independent research center, providing training and debates on major international issues. It was established in 1997.

IERI's areas of study and research cover different fields of international relations, including economic, political, strategic and security aspects.

IERI is a founder of an institution of higher education named ADE (Academia Diplomatica Europaea), organizing conferences and representing a forum for diplomats, military and senior officials.

== Objectives ==
The IERI's initiatives are preserved in the perspective of the emergence of diplomatic, geopolitical and strategic culture according to the provisions related to the European External Action Service.

== History ==
At the beginning of 1990, following the German and European reunification, the activation of a political role of the European Community led to a new impetus of European integration.

From the year 1992, now named the European Union had in its hands the first tools to assert its existence on the international level. It is in this perspective that has placed a University professor, Mr. Irnerio Seminatore in the creation of the European Institute of International Relations.

== Organization ==
- Disciplinary Fields

The studies of IERI include 3 areas:

1. analysis of political and military strategies with the focus on foreign policy, defence and security policy (CFSP/PCSD), including Euro-Atlantic and Euro-Asiatic relations
2. analysis of European Neighborhood Policy (ENP) of the EU, Russia, and central Asian countries
3. forms of integration and regional security institutions : OSCE, SCO, APEC, ASEAN, NAFTA, MECOSUR, UMP, GCC, etc.
- Publications

IERI regularly publishes “working papers” and “IERI news” on topics dealt with the annual courses and conferences of the Academia Diplomatica Europaea (ADE), as well as on current issues. Theoretical essays are devoted to international system, doctrinal or epistemological approaches (“Europe between Utopia and Realpolitik”, “Essays on Europe and International system” and “Six studies on International Balance”), to the North Atlantic Treaty Organization and Institutions of regional integration in the Gulf, Asia and America. IERI also publishes the “Journal of CFSP-ESDP”, the Journal of European Common Foreign Policy, Security and Common Defence.

- Academia Diplomatica Europaea

Academia Diplomatica Europaea is an institution of higher education specialized in providing a post-graduate training in diplomacy, security and defence. It includes a set of introductory seminars to the geopolitical and strategic thinking and to the study of globalization and international security. ADE is addressed to diplomats officials, experts on foreign and defence policy, international affaires leaders, doctoral students and university researchers. ADE issues a diploma.

Over 300 conferences have been held since the founding of ADE. They have gathered a faculty composed of European Commissioners, Ministers, Ambassadors, Diplomats, Senior Staff of the EU and of Member States, specialists, academics and other professionals.
