= European Diplomatic Academy =

European Union diplomatic training programme

- French: Académie diplomatique européenne
- Established: 2022
- Affiliations: College of Europe
- Budget: 1€ million
- Director: Federica Mogherini
- Location: Bruges, Belgium; Natolin, Poland

The European Diplomatic Academy (formally European Union Diplomatic Academy) is a diplomatic training programme launched by the European External Action Service in 2022 after the proposal made by the European Parliament in 2021, with the goal of building a fully-fledged European Union diplomatic corps that can promote EU foreign policy and external interests. It is run by the College of Europe.

The pilot project "Towards the creation of a European Diplomatic Academy", whose author is Nacho Sánchez Amor, was presented by this MEP in April 2021 to the EP's Foreign Affairs Committee (AFET). The proposal was evaluated by the European Commission and the European External Action Service and confirmed that, after certain modifications, the project could be implemented. In September 2021, MEP Nacho Sánchez Amor, within the framework of his work on a broader review of the EU's External Action, submitted the proposal through the European Parliament Report on the EU Annual Budget 2022.

Currently in its pilot programme stage, from September 2022 until May 2023, its participants are trained on EU foreign and security policies with practical and theoretical training modules. At the start of the programme, a two-week study trip to the EU's Eastern border provides first-hand contact with the reality of a security and refugee crisis through visits to Frontex, UNHCR, the Polish Ministry of Foreign Affairs, and visits to the border with Ukraine and Belarus. A first group of 42 young diplomats was selected and sent from the EU member states, Ukraine, Georgia, Moldova, Turkey, the Western Balkans countries and EU institutions to participate in the project. The first Director of the Academy, with the overall responsibility for the design of the programme, is Federica Mogherini, Rector of the College of Europe.

The European Institute of Public Administration, the European University Institute, and the Centre for European Policy Studies are running a feasibility study for the establishment of a permanent European Diplomatic Academy.

== Controversies ==
=== College of Europe procurement corruption allegations ===
In December 2025, the Belgian police, on instructions by the European Public Prosecutor's Office (EPPO) and a Belgian investigating magistrate, raided the College of Europe premises in Bruges as well as the headquarters of the European External Action Service in Brussels as part of an investigation into suspected fraud related to EU-funded training for junior diplomats. The EPPO alleges that the College of Europe had prior knowledge that it would be attributed the bid to host the EDA and purchased a new property based on this prior expectation. The rector, Federica Mogherini, as well as an EU official were detained as part of the investigation.
