= Nic Cheeseman =

British political scientist

- Born: Nic Cheeseman
- Education: University of Oxford
- Awards: Josiah Mason Award for Academic Advancement; Joni Lovenduski Prize for outstanding professional achievement by a mid-career scholar, of the Political Science Association of the UK; Association ESRC Celebrating Impact Prize for Outstanding International Impact

Nic Cheeseman is a British political scientist and professor of democracy at the University of Birmingham. He works on democracy, elections and African politics. He is also a columnist for The Africa Report and South Africa's Mail & Guardian, and the editor of the website Democracy in Africa. A regular commentator in the media, he is sometimes referred to by his Twitter handle, @fromagehomme.

== Education and career ==
Cheeseman read politics, philosophy and economics at the University of Oxford, and then received an MPhil and DPhil in politics from the same university. He was elected as a Cox Fellow at New College, but left in 2006 to take up the position of associate professor of African politics at Jesus College, Oxford. He served as the director of Oxford's African Studies Centre, before moving to the University of Birmingham in January 2017 to become the professor of democracy and international development. In 2022, he became the inaugural Director of the University's new centre of Elections, Democracy, Accountability and Representation.

=== CEDAR ===
He has held a number of visiting professorships, including at Sciences Po, the University of Cape Town, and the Australian National University.

Cheeseman's work initially focused on African politics, including his 2015 monograph Democracy in Africa. He subsequently broadened his writing to look at democracy and elections globally, writing Coalitional Presidentialism in Comparative Perspective with Paul Chaisty and Tim Power, and How to Rig an Election with Brian Klaas.

Further books followed, including Authoritarian Africa: Repression, Resistance and the Power of Ideas, with Jonathan Fisher in 2019, and The Moral Economy of Elections: Democracy, Voting, and Virtue, with Gabrielle Lynch and Justin Willis in 2020. In 2022, Cheeseman established a research project on the history of African political thought. This included co-founding a research network for the study of ideas and ideologies in African politics – IDAP, that seeks to encourage collaborative research on this topic across borders and different generations of scholars.

Cheeseman was co-editor of African Affairs between 2012 and 2016. In 2016, he was appointed founding editor-in-chief of Oxford University Press's Oxford Encyclopaedia of African Politics now co-edits a book series on African Politics and International Relations for Oxford University Press.

Between 2013 and 2017, Cheeseman wrote a bi-weekly column for the Kenyan weekly Sunday Nation, covering topics such as elections, decentralization and corruption. In 2017, however, he resigned from the newspaper, along with a number of colleagues, to protest against government censorship. Since then he has written a regular column for the Africa Report, runs a collaboration with The Continent, the Pan-African Magazine, and regularly writes for South Africa's Mail & Guardian newspaper. He also regularly writes for The Economist, Le Monde, Financial Times, Newsweek, The Washington Post, New York Times, and the BBC.

In 2020, Cheeseman was part of a team that founded the Resistance Bureau, an international webinar that aims to promote freedom and resist repression. Its regular shows include activists, leaders and civil society representatives. He also co-edits democracyinafrica.org, a website for academics, policymakers, practitioners and citizens on African politics.

== Awards and recognition ==
Cheeseman's doctoral thesis, The rise and fall of civil-authoritarianism in Africa: patronage, participation, and political parties in Kenya and Zambia, was awarded the Arthur McDougall Dissertation Prize by the Political Studies Association of the United Kingdom for the Best Dissertation on Elections, Electoral Systems or Representation in 2008.

In 2013, the article "Rethinking the 'presidentialism debate': Conceptualizing coalitional politics in cross-regional perspective", co-authored with Paul Chaisty and Tim Power, was given the CAS Award for the best article published in comparative area studies. How to Rig an Election was selected as one of the books of the year in 2018 by both the Spectator magazine and the Centre for Global Development.

In 2019, Cheeseman won the Joni Lovenduski Prize of the Political Studies Association of the United Kingdom for outstanding professional achievement by a mid-career scholar. In 2019, the research team that he leads was awarded the ESRC Celebrating Impact Prize for Outstanding International Impact for its work on "Strengthening elections and accountability in new democracies".

In 2022, Cheeseman was nominated for the Grawemeyer Award for Ideas Improving World Order for How to Rig an Election, and was awarded the Josiah Mason Award for Academic Advancement, the University of Birmingham.

Cheeseman has also been appointed to a number of different positions with international institutions, including being a member of the Advisory Board of the European Democracy Hub: and a member of the International Advisory Council of the Afrobarometer.

== Books ==
- The Moral Economy of Elections in Africa, Cambridge University Press, 2020 (co-authored with Gabrielle Lynch and Justin Willis].
- The Handbook of Kenyan Politics, Oxford University Press, 2020 (co-edited with Karuti Kanyinga and Gabrielle Lynch).
- The Oxford Encyclopaedia of African Politics, Oxford University Press, 2018 (Editor in Chief).
- Authoritarian Africa, Oxford: Oxford University Press, 2019 (with Jonathan Fisher).
- The Oxford Dictionary of African Politics, Oxford University Press, 2018 (with Eloïse Bertrand, and Sa'eed Husaini).
- Coalitional Presidentialism in Comparative Perspective, Oxford University Press, 2018 (with Paul Chaisty and Tim Power).
- Institutions and Democratization in Africa: How the rules of the game shape political developments, Cambridge University Press, 2018 (sole editor).
- The African Affairs Reader: Key texts in politics, development, and international relations, Oxford University Press, 2017 (co-edited collection with Carl Death and Lindsay Whitfield].
- African Politics: Major Works, Routledge, 2016 (sole editor).
- How to Rig An Election, Yale University Press, 2018 (with Brian Klaas).
- Democracy in Africa: Successes, failures, and the struggle for political reform, Cambridge University Press, 2015.
- Politics Meets Policies: The Emergence of Programmatic Parties, International IDEA, 2014 (with Herbet Kitschelt, Dan Paget, Yi-Ting Wang, Juan Pablo Luna, Fernando Rosenblatt and Sergio Toro].
- The Handbook of African Politics, Routledge, 2013 (co-edited with David Anderson and Andrea Scheibler].
- Our Turn to Eat: Politics in Kenya Since 1950, LIT Verlag, 2010 (co-edited with Daniel Branch and Leigh Gardner].
