= Triangle building =

Building in Brussels

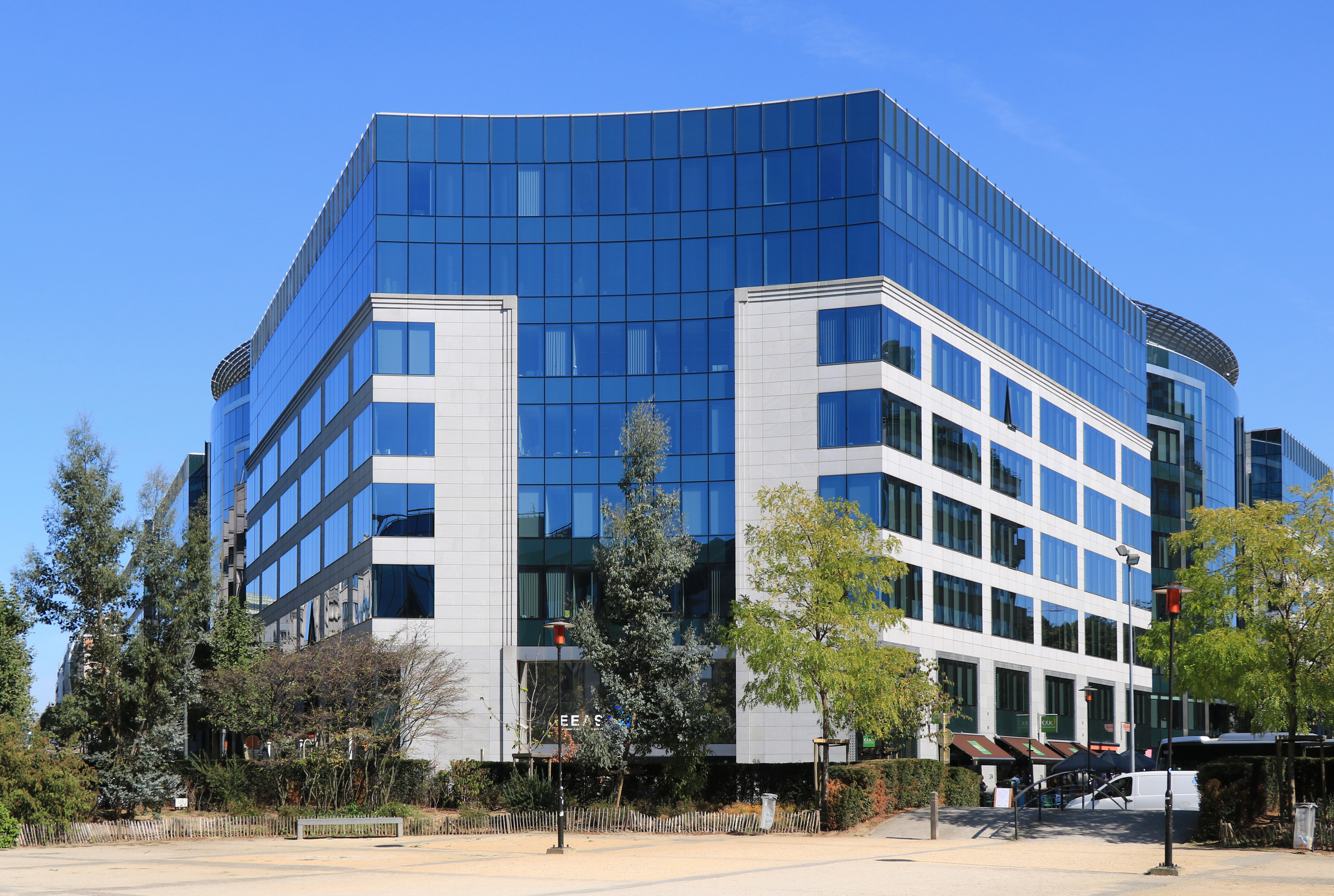
- The Triangle building in Brussels
- Interactive map of the Triangle building area
- Former names: JECL
- Alternative names: The Capital building The Axa building EEAS headquarters

General information
- Type: Office building
- Architectural style: Postmodern
- Location: Avenue de Cortenbergh / Kortenberglaan 1, 1040 City of Brussels, Brussels-Capital Region, Belgium
- Coordinates: 50°50′33″N 4°23′8″E
- Current tenants: The EU diplomatic service (EAS) and personnel selection office (EPSO)
- Completed: 30 June 2009
- Landlord: Axa

Technical details
- Floor count: 7
- Floor area: 60,000 m^{2} (650,000 sq ft)

Design and construction
- Architecture firm: Genval Workshop; ELD

The Triangle building (initially referred to as The Capital) is an office building on the Robert Schuman Roundabout in the heart of the European Quarter of Brussels, Belgium, in which most of the European External Action Service (EEAS) resides. The building also houses some other EU departments. The EEAS staff moved into the building in February 2012.

== History ==
=== Previous buildings ===
Previously there were a number of architecturally diverse buildings on the property, collectively named JECL after the initials of the three surrounding streets: the Avenue de la Joyeuse Entrée, the Avenue de Cortenbergh and the Rue de la Loi.

=== Planning ===
When it was decided that the old JECL complex was to be demolished, the European Commission signalled its interest in purchasing the property in order to build a new EU conference centre on the site. The negotiations between Axa and the commission were tough and lasted for more than five years, but eventually failed in 2006 due to disagreement over the price. Axa instead decided to build an ordinary office building.

=== Construction and inauguration ===
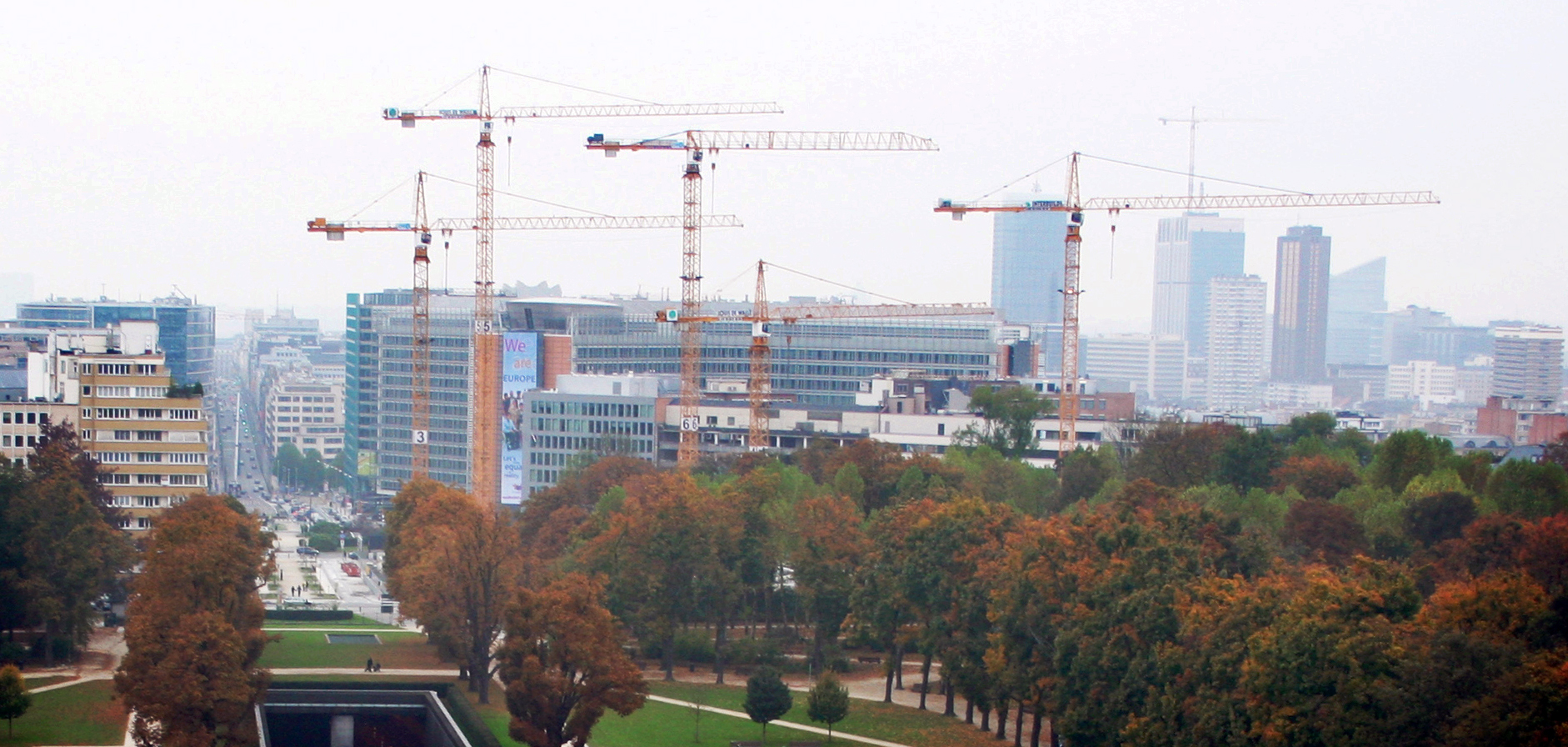
Triangle building under construction in 2007, as seen in the distance across the Parc du Cinquantenaire.

The main structure of the present triangular building was completed in 2009. Referred to as The Capital by Axa, the building was originally divided into 6 technically independent sections named after the capitals of the six founding member states of the European Union (EU): Rome, Paris, Berlin, Luxembourg, Amsterdam and Brussels, respectively. In the centre is a large circular courtyard which is heavily planted and, in 30 years from its construction, the architect insisted it will look "magnificent".

Axa intended to split the complex between the commission, national embassies and private companies. However the Commission refused to share the building. Negotiations became drawn out but as of August 2010 the Commission and Axa were close to a signature for the whole building. In July 2010 European Personnel Selection Office (EPSO) entered one of the six parts of the buildings, occupying 9000m² out of a total of 54000m². It was later joined by the Service for Foreign Policy Instruments (FPI) and the EEAS, whose staff had previously been dispersed across six buildings.

== Tenants ==
The Commission leased 50,000 m^{2} of the 60,000 m^{2} block for at least 15 years at a cost of around €10 million a year. The new EEAS fills most of the space, with some room left for assorted Commission departments. EPSO has in a separate contract leased a 10,000 m^{2} chunk from July 2010. The building is owned by the French insurance company AXA. Further space has been let to street-side shops. The EEAS lease is €12 million-a-year, with the first year free (before moving in, the staff of the newly formed EEAS were housed in six separate buildings at a cost of €25 million a year). The EEAS was inaugurated on 1 December 2010 in the lobby of the building.

The building also hosts the Service for Foreign Policy Instruments, a minor department of the Commission.

== See also ==
- Kortenberg building, in which most Common Security and Defence Policy, including those of the EEAS, bodies are situated as the Triangle building was not deemed sufficiently secure in 2012
- European External Action Service
- Brussels and the European Union
- Institutional seats of the European Union
