= Marie Isabelle Massip =

Canadian diplomat

Marie Isabelle Massip is a Canadian diplomat who was the Ambassador Extraordinary and Plenipotentiary of the Republic of Canada to Liberia (presented her letters of credentials in August 2007). She was appointed Ambassador to the Republic of Côte d'Ivoire, with concurrent accreditation to the Republic of Benin. In 2011, President Laurent Gbagbo of the Ivory Coast expelled Massip and British Ambassador Nicholas James Westcott after their respective governments said they would no longer recognize Gbagbo emissaries. Canada would not honor the expulsion with Foreign Minister Lawrence Cannon saying "Canada has not received a request from the legitimate government of Mr Alassane Ouattara to terminate our ambassador's functions."
