= Royal African Society =

British organization founded in 1901

The Royal African Society (RAS) of the United Kingdom was founded as the African Society in 1901 to promote relations between the United Kingdom and countries in Africa. It received a royal charter in 1935, when it acquired its present name. The RAS is a not-for-profit membership organisation based in London. In addition to producing its journal African Affairs, formerly Journal of the African Society, the RAS runs programmes in business, politics, the arts and education. In 2012, the society launched the Africa Writes festival, presented in partnership with the British Library, and now the UK's most prominent celebration of contemporary literature from Africa and the diaspora.

== History ==
The establishment of the African Society in 1901 grew out of the travels of Mary Kingsley, an English writer and explorer who travelled to Africa several times in the 1890s and greatly influenced European study of the African continent. In 1893, she travelled to Luanda, Angola, where she lived with the indigenous peoples to learn their customs. In 1895 she returned to study cannibal tribes, travelled up the Ogooué River collecting specimens of previously undiscovered fish, and became the first European to climb Mount Cameroon. Upon her return to England, Kingsley upset many people, particularly the Church of England: she criticized missionaries, and supported many traditional aspects of African life, most controversially the practice of polygamy. Kingsley wrote that a "black man is no more an undeveloped white man than a rabbit is an undeveloped hare". She died of typhoid in South Africa in June 1900, and the African Society was formed to commemorate and continue Kingsley's work. It received a royal charter in 1935, becoming the Royal African Society (RAS). Its current Royal Patron is Prince William, Duke of Cambridge.

Its journal, originally Journal of the African Society, now African Affairs, has been in continuous publication since 1902. It is a peer-reviewed academic journal of political, economic and social science.

The society administers the African Studies Association of the UK (established in 1963), which organises a biennial African studies conference, and provides the secretariat for the All-party parliamentary group (APPG) for Africa.

In 2002, the society appointed Richard Dowden as its first executive director and began a significant expansion of its activities (see below). He was succeeded in 2017-23 by Dr Nicholas Westcott, under whom the expansion continued, with a global audience for its events and online channels of over 1 million.

== Activities ==
In addition to its journal and its support for the APPG for Africa, the society organises regular meetings on current African issues, including a series on African "Economies to Watch", and occasional major conferences. In 2009, the RAS, with the International African Institute (IAI) launched the African Arguments Book Series, published by Zed Books. In either 2005 (according to Andrew Skipper) or 2011 (according to the RAS), the RAS created African Arguments, a news website for African journalism and analysis on sociopolitical, economic and cultural African themes, primarily by African writers and journalists.

== Cultural initiatives ==
In 2008, the RAS supported the launch of a London African Film Festival, in co-operation with Africa at the Pictures, and subsequently established the annual festival "Film Africa".

=== Africa Writes ===
In 2012, the RAS established an annual literature festival called "Africa Writes", presented in partnership with the British Library. The festival features both established and emerging talent from the African continent and its diaspora, with book launches, readings, author appearances, panel discussions, family workshops, and other activities. Headline speakers have been: Chimamanda Ngozi Adichie, Ngugi wa Thiong'o, Wole Soyinka, Ama Ata Aidoo, Ben Okri, Nawal El Saadawi, Alain Mabanckou, Chigozie Obioma, Mona Eltahawy and Nana Darkoa Sekyiamah. Having grown significantly, the Africa Writes festivals are now held in alternate years, and as of 2022 regional partnerships deliver satellite events in Leeds, Swindon and Birmingham.

In July 2019, the inauguration of the Africa Writes Lifetime Achievement Award was announced, the first recipient being Margaret Busby.

== See also ==
- William Hugh Beeton
- Richard Dowden
- Nicholas Westcott
