= European Values (think tank) =

Czech non-governmental organisation

European Values Think-Tank
- Evropské hodnoty
- Formation: 2005
- Location: Prague, Czech Republic
- Official language: Czech
- Chairman of the Executive Board: Jakub Janda
- Website: europeanvalues.cz/en/

European Values (Czech: Evropské hodnoty) is a Czech non-governmental organisation founded in 2005 and funded by several governments. Often self-styled as the European Values Center for Security Policy, its incentive is to raise political culture in the Czech Republic as well as on the European level. It defines European values as personal freedom, human dignity, solidarity, active civil society, market economy, democracy and rule of law. The organization promotes closer ties of the Czech Republic with the geopolitical West and fighting what it considers extremist ideologies.

== Activities ==
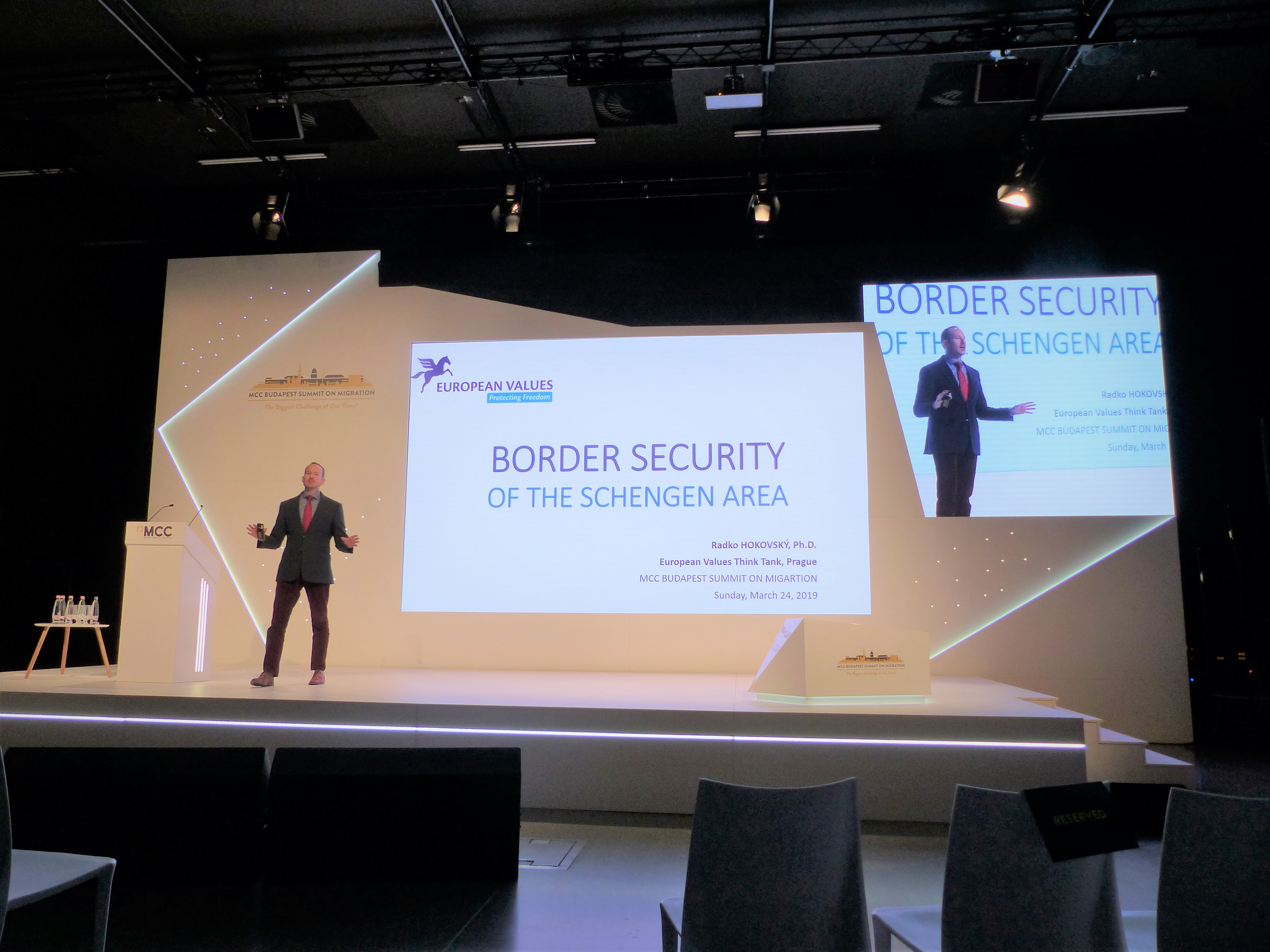
Radko Hokovský – Border Security of the Schengen Area

The European Values organizes public and non-public debates, lectures, seminars and conferences. Among these are "Public debates on disinformation", the HOMEAFFAIRS – Internal Security Forum Prague and Stratcom Summit, which is marketed as informing about "Russian disinformation operations".

Its analyses, policy papers and opinion articles published in newspapers or online share a similar thematic focus. A major program of the think tank is Kremlin Watch, which "aims to expose and confront instruments of Russian influence and disinformation operations focused against Western democracies". Under this program, it awards the "Putin's Champion Award" to European politicians and other public figures the think tank perceives as supporting the current government of Russia. In October 2017 the organization released a report titled "The Kremlin's Platform for 'Useful Idiots' in the West: An Overview of RT's Editorial Strategy and Evidence of Impact", including a list of 2326 persons of public significance primarily in the West who have appeared as guests on RT.

Jakub Janda, Deputy Director of the European Values, has accused the Czech president Miloš Zeman of being a "Russian Trojan Horse".

== European Values Initiative ==
In April 2015, the European Values Initiative was introduced as a movement aimed at strengthening the principles of liberal democracy in Europe via series of debates. The Initiative was backed by various Czech political figures, such as Petr Kolář, Libor Rouček and Štefan Füle.

== Financing ==
The organisation is not linked to any political party. It is sponsored by various institutions and private donors. Some of the donors are International Visegrad Fund (Dutch government), Foreign & Commonwealth Office, British Embassy Prague, U.S. Embassy in The Czech Republic, Representation of the European Commission in the Czech Republic, Embassy of the State of Israel, Embassy of Ukraine in Prague, Netherlands Embassy in Prague. All financial data can be viewed on a transparent bank account.
