= African Affairs =

Academic journal

- Discipline: African studies, Political science, International Relations, Sociology
- Language: English
- Edited by: Ricardo Soares de Oliveira, Ambreena Manji, George Bob-Milliar, and Scott Straus

Publication details
- Former name(s): Journal of the African Society; Journal of the Royal African Society
- History: 1901–present
- Publisher: Oxford University Press (United Kingdom)
- Frequency: Quarterly
- Impact factor: 2.8 (2022)

Standard abbreviations
- ISO 4: Afr. Aff.

Indexing
- ISSN: 0001-9909 (print); 1468-2621 (web)
- LCCN: 2002-227380
- JSTOR: 00019909
- OCLC no.: 51206437

Links
- Journal homepage

African Affairs is a peer-reviewed academic journal published quarterly by Oxford University Press on behalf of the London-based Royal African Society. The journal covers any Africa-related topic: political, social, economic, environmental and historical. Each issue also includes a section of book reviews.

It is the No 1. ranked journal in African Studies and the No 1. ranked journal in Area Studies. The journal is also ranked within political science.

It was established as the Journal of the African Society in 1901, and was published as the Journal of the Royal African Society from 1936 until it obtained its current name in 1944.

== History ==
The journal was established in 1901 at the same time as the society, under the title of the Journal of the African Society; it was published as the Journal of the Royal African Society (ISSN 0368-4016) from 1936 to 1944, and obtained its current name in 1944. The journal's initial scope was defined as covering "many subjects in Africa, such as Racial Characteristics, Labour, Disease, Currency, Banking, Education and so on", to which was later added, "Political and Industrial Conditions". Popular topics for early papers were ethnography and African languages, which between them made up around 60% of the content during its first ten years.

Past editors include Alice Werner, Henry Swanzy (1944), Alan Gray (1954–1966), Tom Soper (1966), Alison Smith, Richard Rathbone (1969), Michael Twaddle, Anthony Atmore, Richard Hodder-Williams, Peter Woodward, David Killingray, Stephen Ellis, Tim Kelsall, Sara Dorman, Nic Cheeseman, Rita Abrahamsen, Lindsay Whitfield, Carl Death and Peace Medie (2017), the first editor to be an academic from Africa.

Since 2012, the journal has offered an African Author prize, which is awarded for the best article published in the journal by an author based in an African institution, or an African Ph.D. student based in an overseas university.

== Abstracting and indexing ==
According to the Journal Citation Reports, the journal has a 2022 impact factor of 2.8.

== See also ==
- List of political science journals
- William Hugh Beeton
