= William Hugh Beeton =

William Hugh Beeton, CMG (14 October 1903 – 26 March 1976) was the Chief Commissioner of Ashanti, which became Ghana in 1957. Beeton also served as Vice President of The Royal African Society.

== Education ==
William Hugh Beeton was educated at Strathallan School in Perthshire and the London School of Economics, University of London.

== Career ==
- Assistant District Commissioner, Gold Coast, 1926.
- District Commissioner, Gold Coast, 1932.
- Administrative Officer, Class II, 1943.
- Senior Assistant Colonial Secretary, 1944.
- Administrative Officer, Class I, 1946. (Assistant Chief Commissioner, Ashanti)
- Chief Commissioner, Ashanti, 1950-54. (Title changed to Chief Regional Officer 1952)

== Awards ==
Appointed a Companion of St Michael and St George, 1954.
