= European External Action Service =

European Union diplomatic service

(in other official languages)
| Bulgarian | Европейска служба за външна дейност |
| Czech | Evropská služba pro vnější činnost |
| Danish | Tjenesten for EU's optræden udadtil |
| German | Europäischer Auswärtiger Dienst |
| Greek | Ευρωπαϊκή Υπηρεσία Εξωτερικής Δράσης |
| Spanish | Servicio europeo de acción exterior |
| Estonian | Euroopa välisteenistus |
| Finnish | Euroopan ulkosuhdehallinto |
| French | Service européen pour l'action extérieure |
| Irish | An tSeirbhís Eorpach Gníomhaíochta Seachtraí |
| Croatian | Europska služba vanjskih poslova |
| Hungarian | Európai külügyi szolgálat |
| Italian | Servizio europeo per l'azione esterna |
| Lithuanian | Europos išorės veiksmų tarnyba |
| Latvian | Eiropas Ārējās darbības dienests |
| Maltese | Servizz Ewropew għall-Azzjoni Esterna |
| Dutch | Europese dienst voor extern optreden |
| Polish | Europejska Służba Działań Zewnętrznych |
| Portuguese | Serviço Europeu de Ação Externa |
| Romanian | Serviciu european pentru acțiunea externa |
| Slovak | Európska služba pre vonkajšiu činnost |
| Slovene | Evropska služba za zunanje delovanje |
| Swedish | Europeiska avdelningen för yttre åtgärder |
- Emblem of the EEAS

Agency overview
- Formed: 1 December 2010
- Preceding agencies: Commission DG RELEX; Council Foreign Dept
- Type: Autonomous institution
- Headquarters: Triangle building 1046 Brussels, Belgium; 50°50′33″N 4°23′8″E
- Employees: 4,169 (2018)
- Annual budget: €678.5 million (2018)
- Agency executives: Kaja Kallas, High Representative; Kajsa Ollongren, Executive Secretary-General
- Child agencies: EUMS; SitCen
- Key documents: Treaty of Lisbon; Council Decision 2010/427/EU
- Website: eeas.europa.eu

Map
- European External Action Service (Brussels)

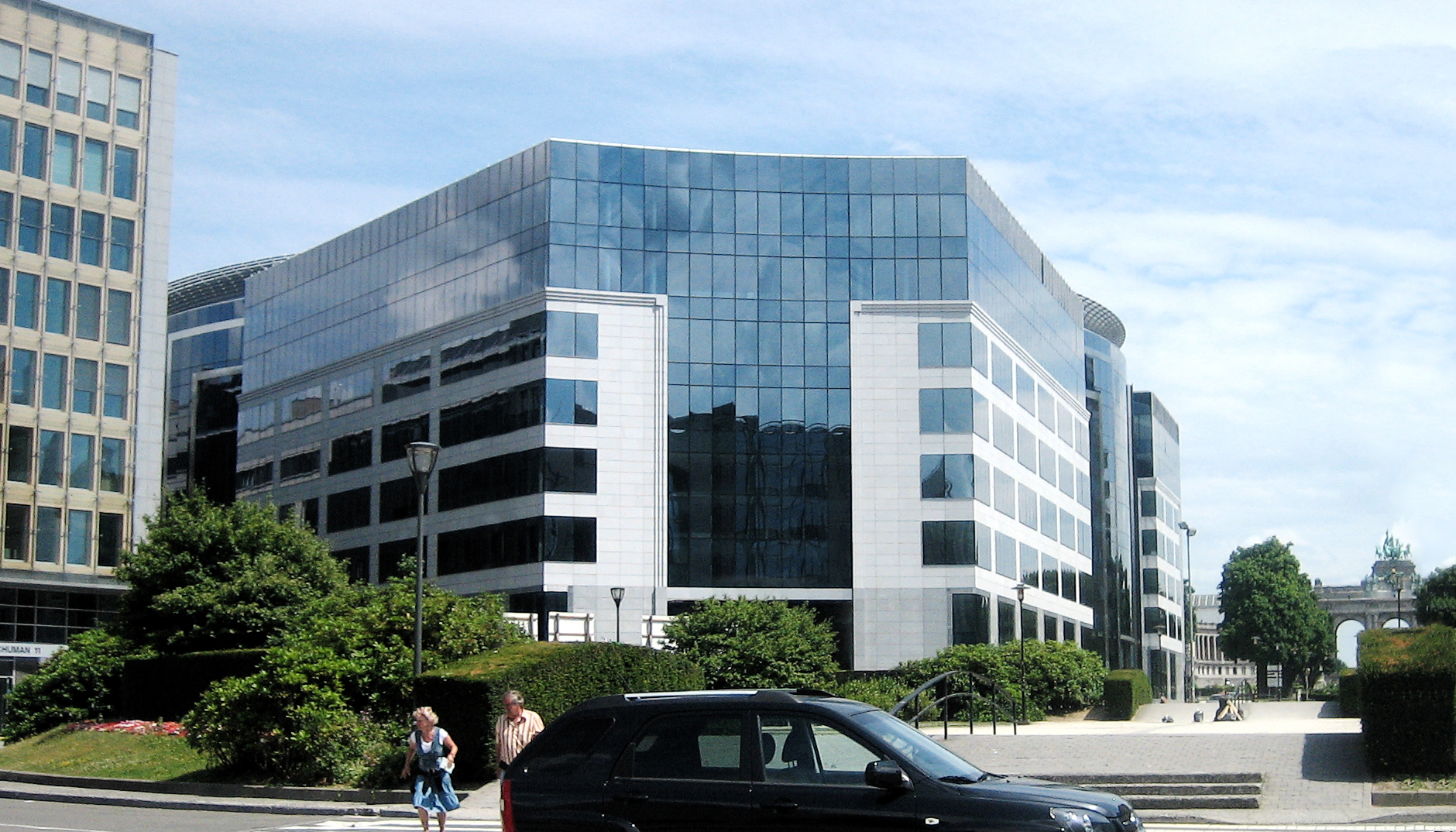
The seat of the EEAS in the European Quarter of Brussels

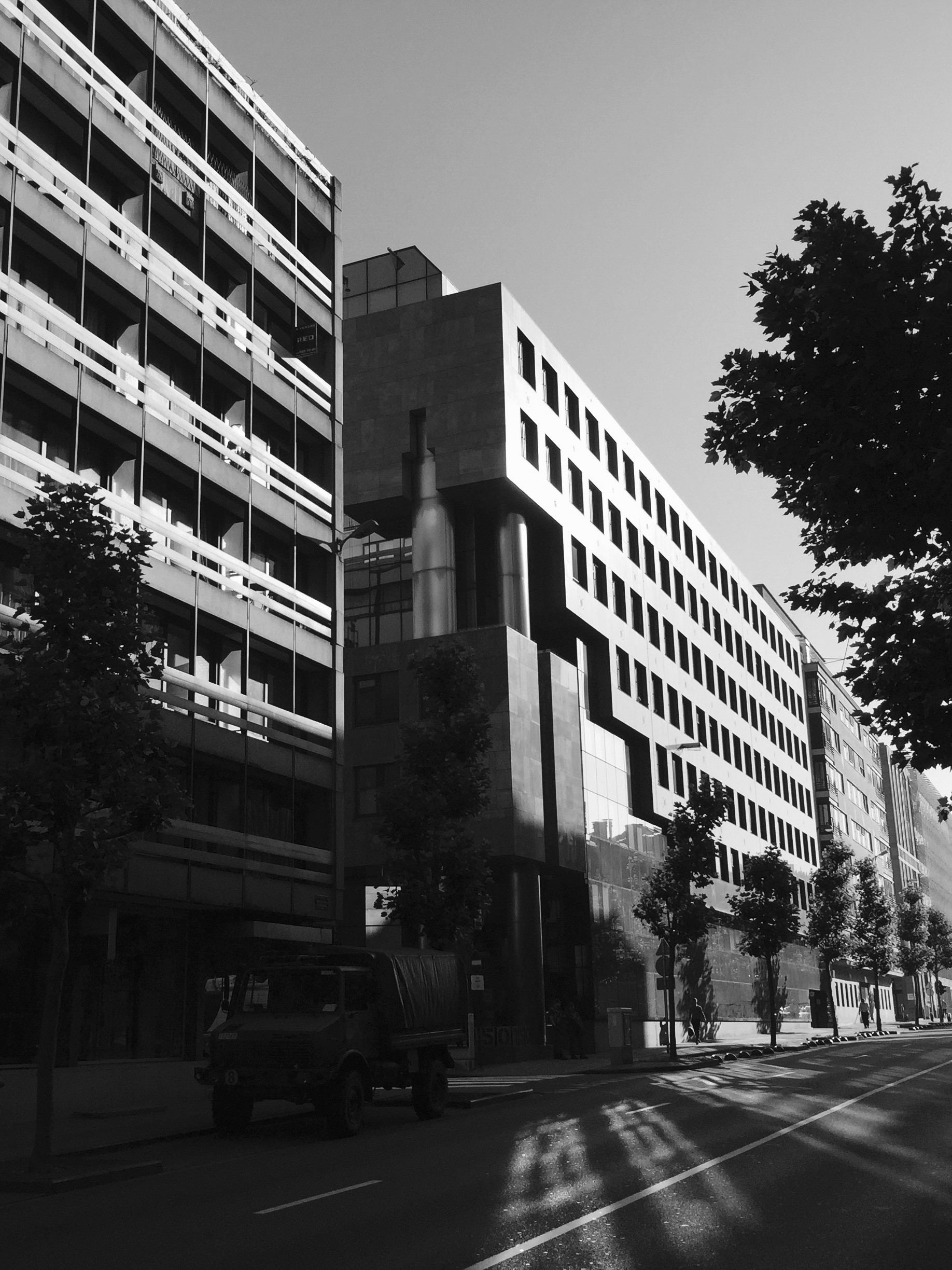
The Kortenberg building, which houses most EEAS bodies related to the Common Security and Defence Policy

The European External Action Service (EEAS) is the diplomatic service in charge of executing all international relations of the European Union (EU). The EEAS is led by the vice-president of the European Commission for Foreign Affairs and Security Policy (HR/VP), who is also President of the Foreign Affairs Council, and carries out the EU's Common Foreign and Security Policy (CFSP), including the Common Security and Defence Policy (CSDP).

The EEAS does not propose or implement policy in its own name, but prepares acts to be adopted by the High Representative, the European Commission or the Council. The EEAS is also in charge of EU diplomatic missions (delegations) and intelligence and crisis management structures.

The EEAS, as well as the office of the HR, was initiated following the entry into force of the Treaty of Lisbon on 1 December 2009. It was formally established on 1 December 2010. The EEAS was formed by merger of the external relations departments of the European Commission and of the Council, which were joined by staff seconded from national diplomatic services of the Member States. Although it supports both the commission and the council, the EEAS is independent from them and has its own staff, as well as a separate section in the EU budget.

The EEAS and the European Defence Agency (EDA) together form the Secretariat of the Permanent Structured Cooperation (PESCO), the structural integration pursued by 26 of the 27 national armed forces of the EU since 2017.

== History ==
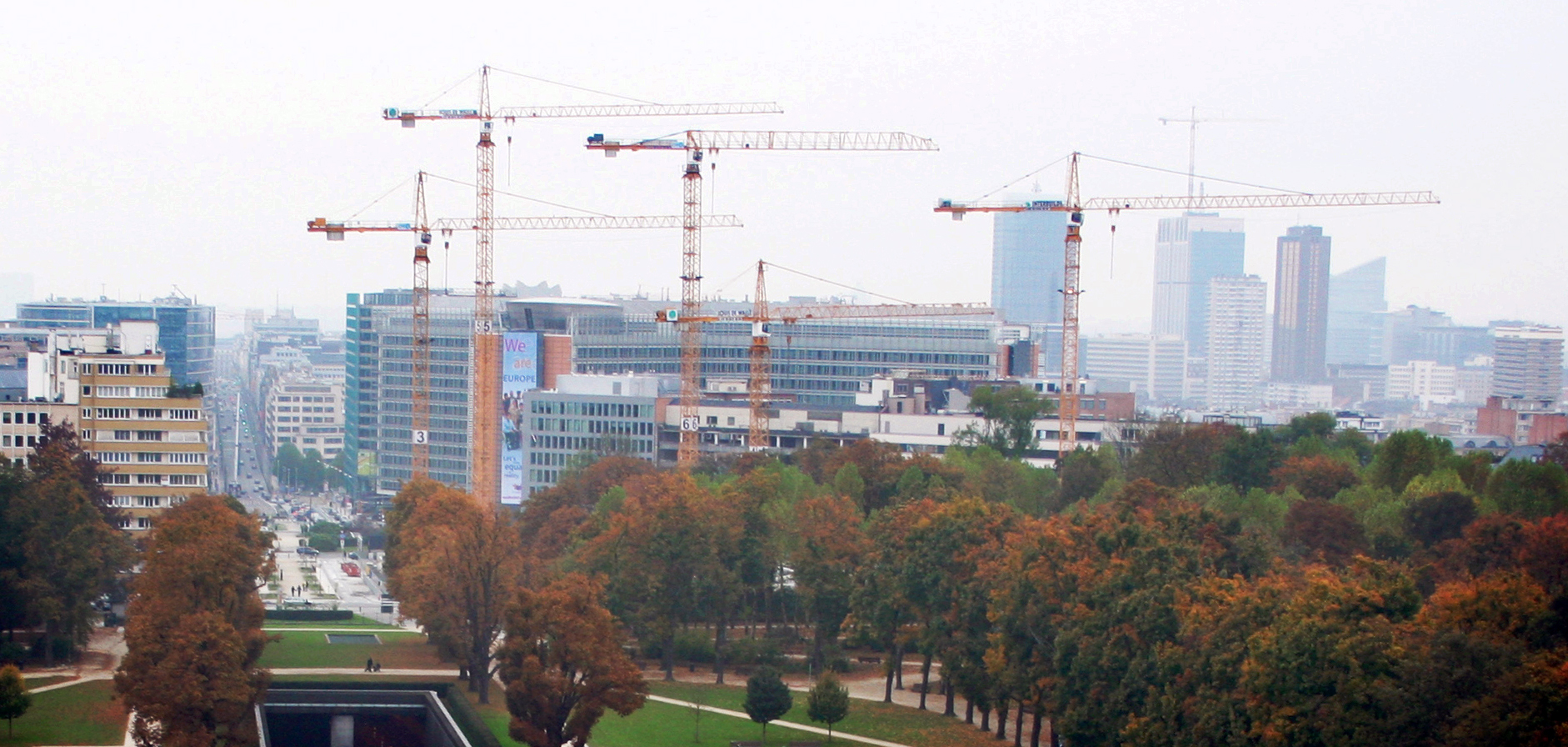
The EEAS main building under construction in 2007, as seen in the distance across the Parc du Cinquantenaire in Brussels, Belgium

The EEAS was first included in the original European Constitution, a single EU external relations department was seen as necessary to support the proposed single HR post; as Charles Grant, Director of the Centre for European Reform, says it would "...be like having a conductor without an orchestra—or rather, a conductor trying to conduct two separate orchestras at the same time." Following the rejection of the Constitution, the changes were revived in the Treaty of Lisbon which came into force in 2009.

The mandate for the External Action Service is laid down under article 13a-III of the Treaty of Lisbon (TEU Article 27), and states the following:

In fulfilling his mandate, the High Representative shall be assisted by a European External Action Service. This service shall work in cooperation with the diplomatic services of the Member States and shall comprise officials from relevant departments of the General Secretariat of the Council and of the Commission as well as staff seconded from national diplomatic services of the Member States. The organisation and functioning of the European External Action Service shall be established by a decision of the Council. The Council shall act on a proposal from the High Representative after consulting the European Parliament and after obtaining the consent of the Commission.

Shortly before the treaty came into force, Catherine Ashton was named HR and tasked with drawing up the structure of the new EEAS. Following the 2010 Haiti earthquake Ashton chaired a meeting of the foreign policy actors across the Commission, Council and member states to give a coordinated response to the disaster. Although she refused to describe it as the first act of the external action service, Ashton did stress that it was the first time that such a co-ordination between all the various EU foreign policy actors had been accomplished before.

Throughout the first half of 2010 Ashton fought for agreement between the Council, Parliament and the Commission as to the future shape of the EEAS. The Commission wanted to retain as many of its existing competencies (trade, development, enlargement, representations and so forth) as possible while Parliament fought to gain as much oversight over the EEAS as possible by demanding scrutiny of appointments and budgets. Parliament removed the last hurdle to the plan on 8 July, when MEPs approved the service by 549 votes for and 78 against with 17 abstentions. The Council approved the transfer of departments to the EEAS on 20 July. Until the EEAS became operational, Ashton was only supported by around 30 people on a floor of the Berlaymont building. The EEAS was formally launched at the Commission headquarters in a low key event on 1 December 2010.

== Organisation ==
For organisation of the executive offices, see Senior posts below.

The EEAS manages general foreign relations, security and defence policies and controls the Situation Centre (see intelligence below). However, although the HR and the EEAS can prepare initiatives, member states make the final policy decisions and the commission also plays a part in technical implementation. The HR must report to the European Parliament. The EEAS would have desks dedicated to all the countries and regional organisations in the world, and specialised units for democracy, human rights and defence.

The EEAS has six geographical departments headed by a managing director. The departments divide the world into: 1) Africa, 2) Asia, 3) Americas, 4) the Middle East and Southern Neighbourhood, 5) Russia, the Eastern Neighbourhood and the Western Balkans and 6) Global and Multilateral Affairs. Geographic desks are not duplicated in the commission. The EEAS also includes departments for security, strategic policy planning, legal affairs, inter-institutional relations, information and public diplomacy, internal audit and inspections, and personal data protection.

=== Departments transferred ===
Parts of the following departments have been transferred from the commission or Council to the External Action Service: the Policy Unit (Council), Directorate-General E (Council), Officials of the General Secretariat of the council on secondment to European Union Special Representatives and ESDP missions Directorate-General for External Relations (Commission), External Service (Commission – Delegations), Directorate-General for Development (Commission).

=== Staff ===
Staff is drawn from the Commission and Council and from the member states' diplomatic services, seconded temporarily. The HR appoints his or her own staff directly. There were no national quotas for the initial 1,100 staff members and a minimum of 33% was to be from member states. The rest are permanent officials drawn from the European Commission and the Secretariat General of the Council of the European Union. This is in part due to the need to establish a common diplomatic culture, which is also what has prompted calls for a European Diplomatic Academy.

On 1 January 2011 the first staff were permanently transferred to the EEAS: 585 from the Commissions External Relations DG (which ceased to exist), 93 from the Commissions Development DG (the remainder of which merged into Development Cooperation DG), 436 from the Commission delegations and 411 from the Council of the European Union. These joined with 118 new posts to create a staff of 1,643 on the day of transfer.

=== Senior posts ===
The day-to-day administration of the EEAS is handled by its Secretary-General. In June 2026, High Representative Kaja Kallas appointed former Dutch defence minister Kajsa Ollongren to the post, replacing Belén Martínez Carbonell.

The EEAS shall be managed by an Executive Secretary-General who will operate under the authority of the High Representative. The Executive Secretary-General shall take all measures necessary to ensure the smooth functioning of the EEAS, including its administrative and budgetary management. The Executive Secretary-General shall ensure effective coordination between all departments in the central administration as well as with the Union Delegations.

— Council agreement's outline of the duties of the Executive Secretary-General

Below the Secretary-General there are two deputy Secretaries-General. One of the deputy secretaries-general deals with administrative matters (such as co-ordination and co-operation with the commission) while the other assists with foreign policy formulation. On 28 July 2015 it was announced that as from mid-September 2015, the Secretary General will be assisted by a third Deputy Secretary-General, in charge of Economic and Global Issues. However under the final agreed plans the HR would be deputised by a relevant European Commissioner or the foreign minister holding the rotating council presidency.

The Secretary-General will also oversee the autonomous cells such as the Situation Centre (see intelligence below), the military staff, an internal security unit, audit unit and a unit for communications and relations with other EU institutions. The chief operating officer deals with the budget and administration and six managing directors each manage a department (see organisation). The following are the current office holders;

| Post | Office-holder | State |
Secretary-General and Deputies
| Secretary-General | Kajsa Ollongren | Netherlands |
| acting Deputy Secretary-General for Economic and Global Issues | Olivier Bailly | France |
| Deputy Secretary General for Political Affairs, Political Director | Olof Skoog | Sweden |
| Deputy Secretary-General for CSDP and Crisis Response | Charles Fries | France |
Managing Directors and Directors General
| Managing Director for Africa | Rita Laranjinha | Portugal |
| Managing Director for Americas | Brian Glynn | Ireland |
| Managing Director for Asia and Pacific | Niclas Kvarnström | Sweden |
| Managing Director for Eastern Europe and Central Asia | Michael Siebert | Germany |
| Managing Director for Europe | Matti Maasikas | Estonia |
| Managing Director for Middle East and Northern Africa | Helene Le Gal | France |
| Managing Director for Peace, Security and Defence | Benedikta von Seherr-Thoss | Germany |
| Managing Director for Global Issues and Communication | Olivier Bailly | French |
| Managing Director for Civilian Operations Headquarters | Stefano Tomat | Italy |
| Director General European Union Military Staff | Lt General Michiel van der Laan | Netherlands |
| Director General for Resource Management | Kristin de Peyron | Sweden |

== Delegations ==
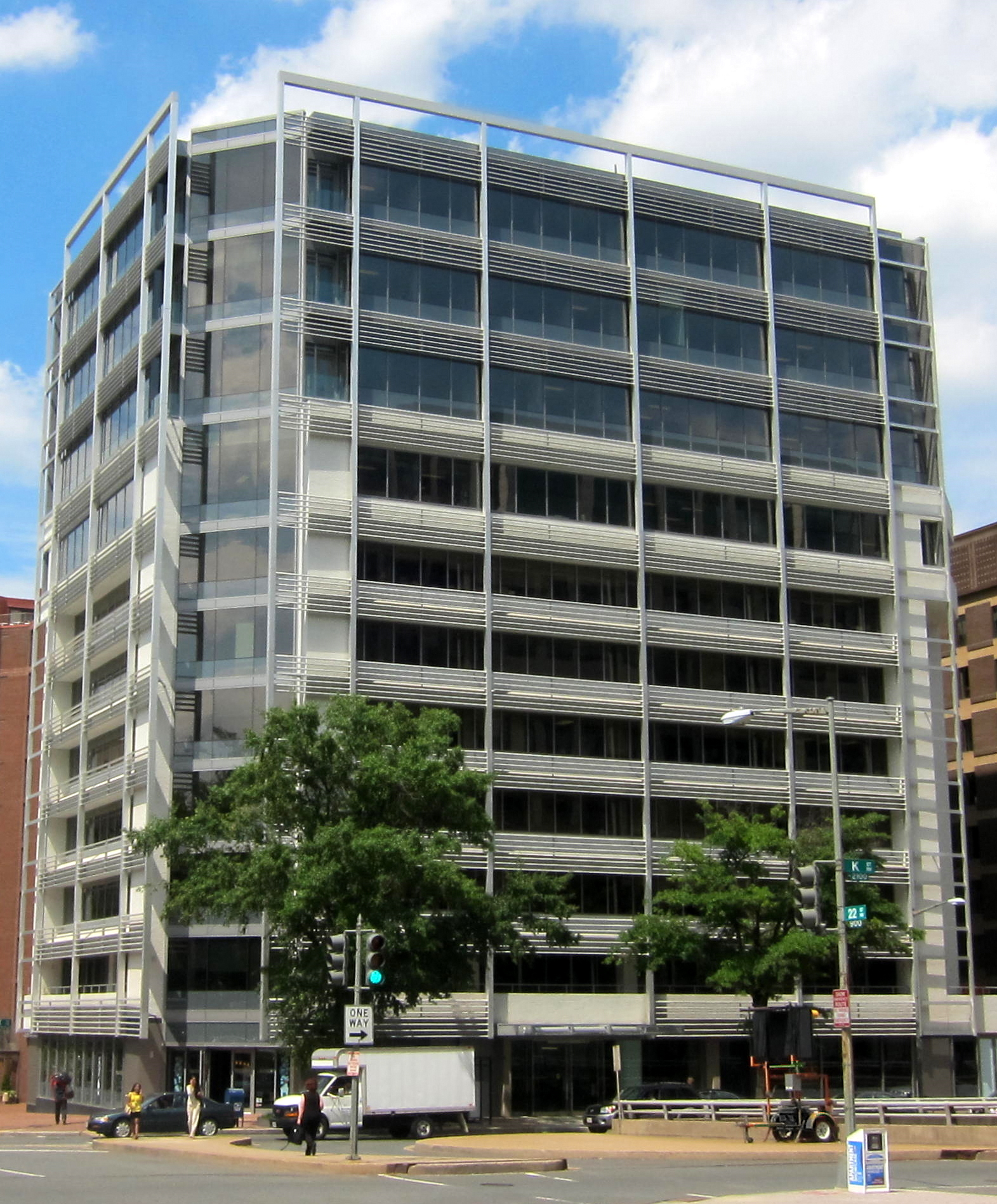
The delegation in Washington, D.C., the first to be upgraded to an EU embassy.

The former Commission's representations abroad fall under the EEAS as EU embassies (although representing the whole of the EU under Lisbon, the commission had wanted to retain management). The delegations would also support visits from MEPs, delegation heads would have hearings in Parliament (though no veto) and they are at the disposal of Parliament for questions concerning the country they dealt with. There are EU delegations in nearly every UN member state and each head of delegation is the EU ambassador (appointed by the High Representative).

On 1 January 2010 all former European Commission delegations were renamed European Union delegations and were gradually upgraded into embassy-type missions that employ greater powers than the regular delegations. These upgraded delegations have taken on the role previously carried out by the national embassies of the member state holding the rotating Presidency of the Council of the European Union and merged with the independent Council delegations around the world. Through this the EU delegations take on the role of co-ordinating national embassies and speaking for the EU as a whole, not just the commission.

The first delegation to be upgraded was the one in Washington D.C., the new joint ambassador was Joao Vale de Almeida who outlined his new powers as speaking for both the Commission and Council presidents, and member states. He would be in charge where there was a common position but otherwise, on bilateral matters, he would not take over from national ambassadors. All delegations are expected to be converted by the end of 2010. Some states may choose to operate through the new EU delegations and close down some of their smaller national embassies, however France has indicated that it will maintain its own network around the world for now.

== Budget ==
The EEAS's budget is proposed and managed by the HR and be signed off every year by Parliament. Parliament would also review the budget of each EU mission; Parliament's oversight would put an end to a long-standing gentlemen's agreement whereby Parliament and Council do not look at each other's budget details.

== Parliamentary oversight ==
Parliament has fought to gain oversight over the EEAS and under final plans the budget, though independent, would be scrutinised by MEPs who can approve or reject it. Parliament would also be consulted on overseas missions and have stronger budgetary oversight over those too. They would also informally vet appointments to prominent foreign embassies and have access to some classified EEAS documents.

== Intelligence and security ==
As part of the merger, the intelligence gathering services in the Commission and Council will be merged. These services are the council's Joint Situation Centre (SitCen) and Watch-Keeping Capability and the commission's Crisis Room. The Situation Centre has 110 staff and has a cell of intelligence analysts from member states who pool classified information to produce concise reports on important topics. It also runs a 24/7 alert desk based on public sources which then updates EU diplomats via SMS on current events. The Watch-Keeping Capability is composed of 12 police and military officers who gather news from the EU's overseas missions.

The commission's Crisis Room is run by six commission officials who run a restricted website reporting breaking news on the 118 active conflicts in the world based on open sources and news from EU embassies. It uses scientific tools including statistical analysis and software which scans global TV broadcasts for names and key words. Details on the plans for the new merged intelligence service are still sketchy as of early 2010 but it will not run undercover operations along the lines of national intelligence agencies despite proposals from Belgium and Austria after the 2004 Madrid train bombings.

The Situation Centre and Crisis Room would be merged and headed by the HR. It would be located near the HR's office headed by a director-general with a staff of around 160 people and a budget of 10 to 20 million euro a year. It would have IT experts, scientists, tacticians and seconded intelligence operatives. It would send people into crisis zones to gather information and have 24/7 hotlines to EU delegations around the world. It would give the HR an immediate and powerful asset in an emergency without having to go via the council's Political and Security committee first. However it is unclear if the council's Clearing House (or Working Group CP 931 which deals with the EU's terrorism blacklist) would be merged into the EEAS along with these other bodies.

Meanwhile, Ashton appointed a Polish security operative to head a working group designing the security architecture of the EEAS; particularly the physical security of the EEAS building and its communication network with its embassies. It is seen as particularly important due to the EEAS handling sensitive, as discussed above, amid espionage concerns from China and Russia.

In September 2010, job adverts went out to EU institutions and national embassies for three junior posts at the EEAS. One for foreign deployment, one for a multi-lingual internet researcher and one to follow up on open and confidential information sources. The adverts expressed more about the future department's work, in particular at the new director would be expected to travel to global hotspots. The director of the Joint Situation Centre was appointed in December 2010, Finnish security chief Ilkka Salmi.

The High Representative also has authority over the European Defence Agency, EU Institute for Security Studies and the EU Satellite Centre, though these remain autonomous from the EEAS itself.

== Commission's responsibilities ==
The European Commission managed to retain control over its competencies in aid (and its €6 billion a year budget), development, energy and enlargement. This gives the relevant Commissioners the lead in those areas and deputise for the HR when necessary. Although the service will have cells for the commission's areas, decisions will have to be made jointly by the HR and the College of Commissioners.

However Ashton's draft plan for the EEAS included proposals for the EEAS to take responsibility for Neighbourhood Policy (currently assigned to the Enlargement Commissioner) and international development at least. Under a compromise with the commission, it was agreed development would be split, with the EEAS taking on three of the five planning cycles from the commission. How this division of labour will work in practice only began being tested in 2012 as the 2014–2020 programming exercise began.

The following Directorates-General (DGs) and Commissioners are not being merged and decisions in these areas require approval from the college of Commissioners:

- EuropeAid Development and Cooperation (inc ECHO): Commissioner for International Cooperation, Humanitarian Aid and Crisis Response (Kristalina Georgieva).
- DG Enlargement: Commissioner for Enlargement (Štefan Füle).
- DG Trade: Commissioner for Trade (Cecilia Malmström).
- DG Energy: Commissioner for Energy (Günther Oettinger).
- Foreign Policy Instruments Service

== Location ==
The EEAS is based in the Triangle building (also known as the Capital, or Axa building) on the Schuman roundabout in the heart of Brussels' EU Quarter. The building is leased at €12 million a year. Prior to moving in, future EEAS staff were located in eight separate buildings at a cost of €25 million each year. The EEAS lease most of the building, with Commission departments filling the remaining space. The European Personnel Selection Office (Epso) was already occupying part of the building since July 2010.

It was originally expected that the EEAS would take over the commission's Charlemagne building on the Rue de la Loi which housed the now defunct Directorate-General for External Relations (RELEX). However that building was thought to be too small, would be too closely associated with RELEX (going against the image of the EEAS as a unique independent institution) and would take too long to overhaul. It was also proposed that the EEAS take over the Lex building. Due to cost and security considerations, Ashton had preferred to take over the Lex building which could be rented from the Council at a lower rate and already has a higher security rating with tunnels to the main Commission and Council buildings. However, in order to take over the building, the council staff would have to be willing to leave and the council's budget increased so they could find new accommodation. Due to the staff in Lex unwilling to move, the triangle building was chosen by Ashton in October 2010.

The EEAS's CSDP bodies are situated in the Kortenberg building, as these could not be moved to the Triangle building in 2012 for security reasons.

== See also ==
- Common Foreign and Security Policy
- Foreign relations of the European Union
- Joint European Union Intelligence School
- List of diplomatic missions of the European Union
- List of European Union ambassadors
- Foreign information manipulation and interference
