= Irène Souka =

Former EU civil servant (born 1953/1954)

Irène Souka (born 1953 or 1954) is a former European civil servant from Greece who served in the European Commission for 40 years starting in 1980. From May 2009 to January 2020, she was director general of the Directorate-General for Human Resources and Security. As of 2015, Souka was one of only six female directors-general among the 35 directors within the European Commission.

== Early life and education ==
Souka earned a law degree from the University of Athens. She holds post-graduate degrees from University of Cambridge and Free University of Brussels (VUB).

== Career ==
Souka first joined the European Commission in 1980, and held posts in the Translation Department and the Secretariat General. From 1990 to 2000, she was at the Directorate-General for Competition, and was promoted to head of unit for personnel, budget, administration and information. In 2000, she transferred to the Directorate-General for Personnel and Administration, serving as head of unit for organisational chart and management staff. From 2002, she was director responsible for recruitment planning, career structures, performance evaluations, promotions, and training.

In 2008, Souka was appointed deputy director-general for Personnel and Administration (DG ADMIN), which later became known as the Directorate-General for Human Resources and Security (DG HR). She was promoted to director-general one year later.

As director-general, she helped push through reforms of the European Commission's performance appraisal process. During her tenure, Souka also helped to end mandatory rotation for senior managers every five to seven years, a policy which had come into force in 1999; reversing the policy enabled her to stay on as director-general for 11 years. At the same time, she was an advocate of rotation or "mobility" for middle managers. In 2016, Souka launched an "anti-leaks" strategy to prevent confidential information, including sensitive policy documents, from being leaked to the media, a top concern for president Jean-Claude Juncker.

=== Role in Selmayr controversy ===
In February 2018, the College of Commissioners approved the extension of Souka's term as director-general of human resources beyond the compulsory retirement age of 65. They also approved the extension of her husband Dominique Ristori's term as director general of energy.

At the same meeting, the Commissioners appointed Martin Selmayr to the post of Secretary-General of the European Commission, immediately following the abrupt resignation of Alexander Italianer, also during the meeting. The lack of transparency around the staging of Selmayr's appointment led to an outcry within the European Union and in the media, even while the commission insisted that the rules had been followed, with journalist Jean Quatremer calling out Souka's "complicity" in enabling Selmayr's "coup". In December 2018, Souka received a further delay to her retirement until January 2020.

The European Ombudsman later concluded that the Consultative Committee on Appointments, of which Souka was a permanent member, had not followed its own procedure, leading Politico to comment that Souka had been "heavily" involved in "distorting the Commission's rules on senior appointments to ensure that Selmayr's route to the top job was cleared of all obstacles".

=== Retirement ===
On 28 January 2020, Souka sent a farewell email to thousands of people in her department, and to other directors-general in her network, forwarding a copy of the email she had sent the night before to Bjoern Seibert, president Ursula von der Leyen's chief of cabinet. In her email to Seibert, she complained that she had not been notified whether or not her contract would be further extended, with only four days to go before her retirement date – conduct which she characterised as "disrespectful". Later that day, HR commissioner Johannes Hahn replied to the same recipients, thanking Souka for her assistance in managing a smooth transition within the European Commission, and noting that she would be succeeded by deputy director general Bernard Magehann.

== Personal life ==
Souka first met her husband Dominique Ristori, a French citizen, in the 1980s. At the time, she was assistant to the head of the translation department, while he was assistant to the director-general of personnel. They went on to become known as a "power couple" within the European Commission, when Ristori was head of the energy department and Souka was head of human resources.
