= Olivier Salles =

European civil servant

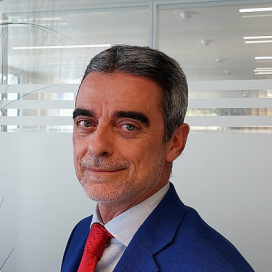
- Salles in 2025

Director of EPSO
- Incumbent
- Assumed office 16 May 2025
- Preceded by: Minna Vuorio

Interim Executive Director of the Anti-Money Laundering Authority
- In office January 2023 – April 2025
- Preceded by: Position established
- Succeeded by: Nicolas Vasse

Interim Administrative Director of the European Public Prosecutor's Office
- In office November 2018 – May 2020
- Preceded by: Position established
- Succeeded by: Olivier Ramsayer

Acting Chair of the Single Resolution Board
- In office May 2014 – August 2015
- Preceded by: Position established
- Succeeded by: Elke König

Personal details
- Citizenship: France
- Education: Lyon II University; Paris I Sorbonne
- Profession: European civil servant

Olivier Salles is a European civil servant of French nationality who has served as Director of the European Personnel Selection Office (EPSO) since May 2025.

== Education ==
Olivier Salles studied political science at Lyon II University, graduating with a master's degree in 1988. He subsequently attended the Sorbonne (Paris I), from which he graduated with a research master's degree in International Relations in 1991.

== Career ==
Olivier Salles joined the European civil service in 1993 as a legal officer at the Secretariat-General of the European Commission, working on relations with the Council of the European Union.

After six years at the Secretariat-General, Salles joined DG EAC (then DG XXII - Education, Youth and Training), working as assistant to the Director-General, David O'Sullivan. Thereafter, from 1999 onwards, Salles specialised in human resource management, working successively at DG EAC, DG RELEX, DG HR and DG MARKT, serving as Head of Unit in the latter for 'Human Resources and Finances' from 2004 to 2010.

In 2010, Salles was appointed as Adviser for the three European Supervisory Authorities at DG MARKT and, from 2011 until 2014, as Head of Unit for International Affairs within the same DG.

In 2014, Olivier Salles was appointed as Acting Chair of the Single Resolution Board (SRB) in its phase of creation, continuing his work on the EU framework for financial supervision and undertaking the operational groundwork for the agency prior to the appointment of Elke König as the first formal chair. Slightly over a year later, Salles returned to DG FISMA and, later, worked in DG BUDG. Salles played a role as a negotiator for trade agreements with Canada and the US. He has advocated for the role of governmental organisations in financial literacy and education for European citizens.

As with the SRB in 2014, Salles was chosen as the first interim Administrative Director of the European Public Prosecutor's Office (EPPO), working with the task force in DG JUST charged with its setting up. In his role at the EPPO, he was responsible for the administrative and budgetary direction of the office in its launch phase. He was succeeded by Olivier Ramsayer, the first formal Administrative Director, in 2020 and took up a role at OLAF, notably working on EPSO/OLAF concours.

Having contributed, at the very earliest stages, to the launch of the SRB and the EPPO, as well as experienced in the field of financial regulation, Salles was chosen as the first interim Executive Director of the Anti-Money Laundering Authority (AMLA) in 2023, heading the AMLA task force from DG FISMA. He served in the role until the appointment of the first official Executive Director of AMLA, Nicolas Vasse, upon which date he was made Director of EPSO, in charge of organising the selection procedures for EU officials.

During his term at EPSO, Olivier Salles has overseen the modernisation of recruitment procedures, notably through increasing digitisation. This has led to criticism over technical glitches in the rollout, particularly from the European Parliament which has raised a concern on the reputational damage potentially caused to EU institutions.

Alongside French, Salles also speaks English, Italian and Spanish.
