= Martin Selmayr appointment scandal =

2018 political scandal

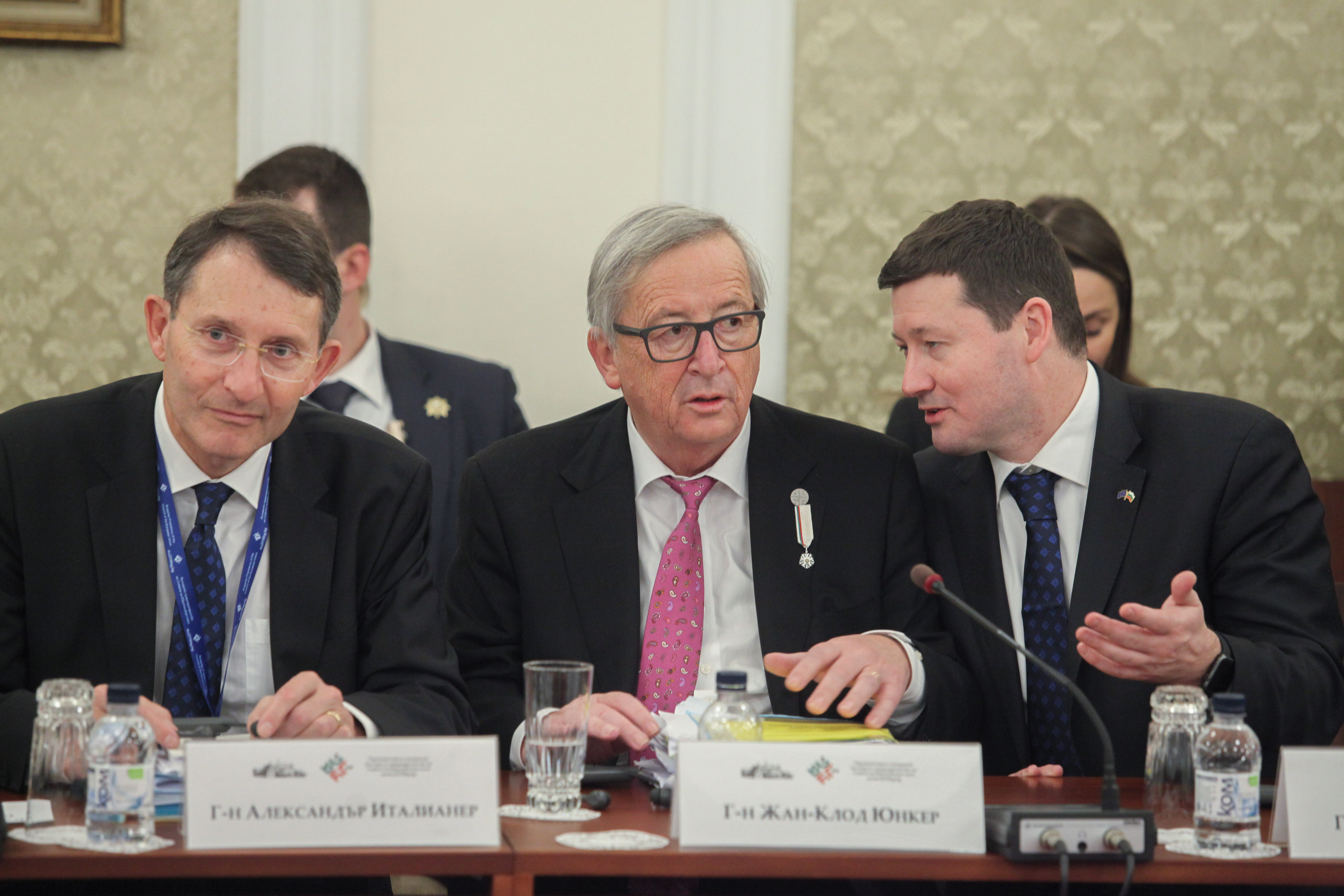
From left to right: Alexander Italianer, Jean-Claude Juncker, and Martin Selmayr in January 2018.

On 21 February 2018, Martin Selmayr was appointed Secretary-General of the European Commission (EC). The appointment was widely criticised as being transparent and bypassing established appointment procedures. Selmayr resigned in July 2019.

== Background ==
Selmayr had become known within the EU institutions for the fast pace of his promotions. He had been chief-of-staff for President of the Commission Jean-Claude Juncker since 2014. In that role, he had amassed significant influence within the EC and was often described as the "monster of the Berlaymont" by colleagues and media.

== Appointment ==
Selmayr had originally applied for the position of Deputy Secretary-General. He was appointed to the position in a meeting of the College of Commissioners, composed of the 28 Commissioners of the EC, on the morning of 21 February 2018. Juncker then informed the Commissioners that incumbent Secretary-General Alexander Italianer would be retiring and suggested that Selmayr take his place. Selmayr's promotion to Secretary-General was confirmed by the Commissioners in the same meeting. Reportedly, the appointment was added to the meeting agenda shortly before the meeting took place "in a bid to avoid the news being leaked and to prevent commissioners from coordinating opposition to the move."

== Reactions ==
=== Procedural issues ===
The procedure was criticised as having bypassed legitimate appointment procedures by various Members of the European Parliament, including some belonging to parliamentary groups that supported Juncker. A parliamentary motion called Selmayr's promotion "coup-like" and argued that it may have "overstretched the limits of the law". This was initially denied by the EC. Juncker reportedly threatened to resign if the controversy led to Selmayr's dismissal. On 25 March 2018, the EC issued a formal statement claiming that Selmayr's promotion was in accordance with legal procedures. Günther Oettinger, at the time German Commissioner for Human Resources and present at the meeting, described the promotion as "by the book".

==== Ombudsman report ====
The EC's Ombudsman office began investigating the appointment after it received two formal complaints.

On 31 August 2018, the Ombudsman published its report on the matter, which sharply criticised the EC and found multiple instances of wrongdoing. Specifically, four instances of maladministration were identified. The Ombudsman criticised that the Commission had failed to account for conflicts of interest in appointment procedures, that the composition of the appointment committee was inappropriate, that the appointment was procedurally flawed, and that artificial time constraints in the appointment procedure limited the ability of Commissioners to evaluate alternative candidates.

The report also criticised the EC's response to concerns from MEPs as "defensive, evasive and, at times, combative."

=== Influence of Germany ===
The appointment was also criticised for further strengthening the influence of Germany within the EU; at the time, many important positions within the institutions of the EU were held by German nationals.
