= Josef Selmayr =

German brigadier general and intelligence officer

Brigadier General Josef Selmayr

1st Director of the Military Counterintelligence Service
- In office 1955–1964
- Succeeded by: Brig Gen Heinrich Seeliger

Personal details
- Born: July 7, 1905 Straubing, German Empire
- Died: November 11, 2005 (aged 100)
- Occupation: Intelligence officer

Josef Selmayr (7 July 1905 – 11 November 2005) was a German brigadier general and intelligence officer, who is best known as the first director of the West German Military Counterintelligence Service (MAD) during the Cold War from 1955 to 1964. He is credited with building the organization and is one of the founders of the modern German Intelligence Community, as well as one of the first general officers of the Bundeswehr. He became a professional soldier in the Weimar Republic in 1924 and started his career in intelligence in the Foreign Armies East unit that analysed the Soviet Union during WWII; before his 1955 appointment as director of MAD he worked for the CIA during the early 1950s. He is the father of Gerhard Selmayr and the grandfather of the Secretary-General of the European Commission, Martin Selmayr.

== Early career and WWII ==
Selmayr was born to a Catholic family from Bavaria, as the son of the pharmacist Josef Selmayr (1877–1927) and Josefine née Betz (1879–1938). His grandfather Georg Selmayr (1852–1920) was the brother of the last mayor of Bogenhausen, now a district of Munich, also named Josef Selmayr.

He became a professional soldier in 1924 during the Weimar Republic and served in a number of administrative posts in the interwar period and the Second World War. He became a captain in the late 1930s and a major around 1942, and was promoted to colonel near the end of the war. He eventually served as a staff officer on the general staff of Army Group F in the Balkans and in the Foreign Armies East military intelligence organization, which focused on analyzing the Soviet Union and other East European states. He received the German Cross in Gold and the Iron Cross First Class and Second Class. At the end of the war he initially became an American prisoner of war, but was later transferred to British control. He was never a member of any political party; political activities were forbidden for members of the military, a policy dating back to the establishment of the Weimar Republic and that was enforced until 1944.

== Imprisonment in Communist Yugoslavia ==
In 1946, he was delivered as prisoner of war from the British army to the Socialist Federal Republic of Yugoslavia, at the time a one-party state allied with Stalin. In late 1948 he was sentenced by a Yugoslav military tribunal to 15 years in prison as a war criminal, but was released about a year later in 1950. Selmayr recounted his experiences in Tito's Yugoslavia in the book Die grosse Pause: Deutsche Soldaten in Titos Gewalt; according to the book he and his fellow soldiers were essentially hostages of the Yugoslav communist regime and he described the trials that took place there as political show trials based on political charges produced by the country's communist regime and unrecognised under international law; he and the other soldiers were released following the Tito–Stalin Split and the realignment of Yugoslav foreign policy that resulted in better relations with West Germany, after Chancellor Konrad Adenauer had negotiated with the Yugoslav government for the repatriation of the remaining German prisoners of war.

== Work for the CIA ==
In 1950 he made it back to West Germany, and in 1951 he was employed by the Gehlen Organization, a CIA-affiliated intelligence agency focused on the East European communist regimes, especially the Soviet Union. He served with the CIA as an expert on the Eastern European communist regimes. The Gehlen Organization was transferred from the CIA to the West German government and became the Federal Intelligence Service a year after Selmayr left the organization.

== Director of the Military Counterintelligence Service ==
In 1955 he was promoted to brigadier general in the West German Bundeswehr and appointed as the first director of the Military Counterintelligence Service, serving in the position for nine years until 1964. He is credited with building the organization. He thus became one of the first general officers of the Bundeswehr, one of the founders of the modern German military and one of the founders of the modern German Intelligence Community.

Josef Selmayr has been described as a close associate of Reinhard Gehlen; in the early days of the Cold War Gehlen succeeded in gaining a monopoly for himself in the West German intelligence community, and he succeeded in getting his confidant Selmayr appointed as director of the Military Counterintelligence Service, which was formally part of the military and separate from the Federal Intelligence Service, where Gehlen was president.

== Retirement and final years ==
At the end of his career, Selmayr became known for contesting his retirement with legal means. The normal retirement age for senior military officers was 60 years, but the Ministry of Defence at the time sought to retire senior officers even before they reached 60 to make room for younger talent, and accordingly it was decided that Selmayr had to retire in 1964, the year he turned 59. Selmayr contested this decision in the Federal Administrative Court, but lost. He died in 2005 at the age of 100, 41 years after he retired.

He wrote a memoir about his own experiences as a soldier and a book about his experiences in Tito's Yugoslavia, which were published after his death by his son Gerhard Selmayr. He also wrote a book about his family.

== Publications ==
- Hundert Jahre Familie Selmayr in Schloßgut Erching, 1998
- Josef Selmayr (author), Gerhard Selmayr (editor): Die grosse Pause: Deutsche Soldaten in Titos Gewalt, 2014, ISBN 978-3-738-60004-9
- Josef Selmayr (author), Gerhard Selmayr (editor.): Ein Sandkorn im Sturm: Aufzeichnungen eines Soldaten 1905–1945, 2016, ISBN 978-3-741-20999-4
