= List of international prime ministerial trips made by Natalia Gavrilița =

This is a list of international trips made by Natalia Gavrilița, the Prime Minister of Moldova (6 August 2021 – 16 February 2023).

During her term in office, she made:

- One visit to United Kingdom, Poland, Switzerland, Greece, Qatar, United States, Japan, Azerbaijan and Ukraine.
- Two visits to Germany.
- Four visits to Belgium and Romania.

== 2021 ==
#	Country	Location	Date	Details
1	Belgium	Brussels	27–28 September	Met with: Charles Michel – President of the European Council; Josep Borrell – Vice-President of the European Commission; High Representative for Foreign Affairs and Security Policy; Paolo Gentiloni – European Commissioner for Economy; Oliver Varhelyi – European Commissioner for Neighbourhood and Enlargement; Didier Reynders – European Commissioner for Justice; Adina-Ioana Vălean – European Commissioner for Transport; Kadri Simson – European Commissioner for Energy
2	Belgium	Brussels	27 October	Participated in the EU-Moldova Association Council. Met with: Josep Borrell – Vice-President of the European Commission; High Representative for Foreign Affairs and Security Policy; Valdis Dombrovskis – Executive Vice President of the European Commission for An Economy that Works for People; European Commissioner for Trade; Mariya Gabriel – European Commissioner for Innovation, Research, Culture, Education and Youth; Virginijus Sinkevičius – European Commissioner for Environment, Oceans and Fisheries; Thierry Breton – European Commissioner for Internal Market; Kadri Simson – European Commissioner for Energy
3	United Kingdom	London	15–16 November	Met with: Stephen Lovegrone – National Security Advisor; Wendy Morton – Parliamentary Under-Secretary of State for European Neighbourhood and the Americas
4	Belgium	Brussels	29 November – 1 December	Met with: Charles Michel – President of the European Council; Ursula von der Leyen – President of the European Commission; David Sassoli – President of the European Parliament; Denys Shmyhal – Prime Minister of Ukraine; Irakli Garibashvili – Prime Minister of Georgia
5	Romania	Bucharest	9 December	Met with: Klaus Iohannis – President of Romania; Nicolae Ciucă – Prime Minister of Romania; Florin Cîțu – President of the Senate

== 2022 ==
#	Country	Location	Date	Details
6	Germany	Berlin	4–7 April	Met with: Nancy Faeser – Federal Minister of the Interior and Community; Annalena Baerbock – Federal Minister of Foreign Affairs; Jean-Yves Le Drian – Minister for Europe and Foreign Affairs of France; Bogdan Aurescu – Minister of Foreign Affairs of Romania
6	Poland	Warsaw	7–9 April	Met with: Andrzej Duda – President of Poland; Mateusz Morawiecki – Prime Minister of Poland; Tomasz Grodzki – Marshal of the Senate; Elżbieta Witek – Marshal of the Sejm
7	Switzerland	Davos	24–25 May	Met with: Mark Rutte – Prime Minister of the Netherlands; Andrej Plenković – Prime Minister of Croatia; Kiril Petkov – Prime Minister of Bulgaria; Irakli Garibashvili – Prime Minister of Georgia; Xavier Bettel – Prime Minister of Luxembourg; Daniel Risch – Prime Minister of Liechtenstein; Joe Kaeser – Chairman of Siemens Energy
8	Romania	Bucharest	10 June	Met with: Nicolae Ciucă – Prime Minister of Romania
8	Greece	Thessaloniki	10 June	Attended the South-East European Cooperation Process Summit.
8	Qatar	Doha	11–13 June	Met with: Khalid bin Khalifa bin Abdul Aziz Al Thani – Prime Minister of Qatar
9	United States	Washington, D.C.	14–21 July	Met with: Antony Blinken – Secretary of State; Wally Adeyemo – Deputy Secretary of the Treasury; David Turk – Deputy Secretary of Energy; Chris Coons – Chair of the Senate Ethics Committee; Rob Portman – Ranking Member of the Senate Homeland Security Committee; Steve Daines – United States Senator; David Price – Member of the House of Representatives; August Pfluger – Member of the House of Representatives; Samantha Power – Administrator of the USAID; David Malpas – President of the World Bank Group; Elaine Marshall – North Carolina Secretary of State
10	Romania	Bucharest	13 September	Met with: Nicolae Ciucă – Prime Minister of Romania
11	Japan	Tokyo	26–28 September	Met with: Fumio Kishida – Prime Minister of Japan; Akihiko Tanaka – President of the Japan International Cooperation Agency
12	Azerbaijan	Baku	10–12 October	Met with: Ilham Aliyev – President of Azerbaijan; Ali Asadov – Prime Minister of Azerbaijan; Sahiba Gafarova – Speaker of the National Assembly; Mikayil Jabbarov – Minister of Economу
13	Romania	Bucharest	29 November	Met with: Nicolae Ciucă – Prime Minister of Romania; Alina Gorghiu – Acting President of the Senate
14	Ukraine	Kyiv, Bucha, Irpin	6 December	Met with: Denys Shmyhal – Prime Minister of Ukraine

== 2023 ==
#	Country	Location	Date	Details
15	Germany	Seeon-Seebruck	6–8 January	Met with: Roberta Metsola – President of the European Parliament; Manfred Weber – President of the European People's Party; Leader of the European People's Party in the European Parliament; Alexander Dobrindt – First Deputy Leader of the CDU/CSU Group in the Bundestag; Boris Rhein – Minister-President of Hesse
16	Belgium	Brussels	4–8 February	Met with: Charles Michel – President of the European Council; Ursula von der Leyen – President of the European Commission; Roberta Metsola – President of the European Parliament; Mircea Geoană – Deputy Secretary General of NATO; Frans Timmermans – First Vice-President of the European Commission; European Commissioner for Climate Action; Josep Borrell – Vice-President of the European Commission; High Representative of the European Union for Foreign Affairs and Security Policy; Maroš Šefčovič – Vice-President of the European Commission for Interinstitutional Relations; Margaritis Schinas – Vice-President of the European Commission; European Commissioner for Promoting our European Way of Life; Valdis Dombrovkis – Executive Vice President of the European Commission for An Economy that Works for People; European Commissioner for Trade; Margrethe Vestager – Executive Vice President of the European Commission for A Europe Fit for the Digital Age; European Commissioner for Competition; Oliver Varhelyi – European Commissioner for Neighbourhood and Enlargement; Paolo Gentiloni – European Commissioner for Economy; Kadri Simson – European Commissioner for Energy; Ilze Juhansone – Secretary-General of the European Commission; Siegfried Mureșan – Member of the European Parliament; Gert Jan Koopman – Director-General of the Directorate-General Neighbourhood and Enlargement Negotiations
