= Gerhard Selmayr =

German lawyer and academic administrator (born 1935)

Gerhard Selmayr (born 1935) is a German lawyer and academic administrator. He served as Chancellor of the University of the Bundeswehr Munich from 1973 to 1978 and as Chancellor of the University of Karlsruhe (TH) from 1978 to 2000.

He studied law and economics from 1954 to 1962 and earned a PhD in law. He worked in the Ministry of Defence from 1965 to 1967, including as private secretary to the state secretary. He was the private secretary to the German Chancellery Chief of Staff from 1968 to 1969.

He is a son of Brigadier General Josef Selmayr, the first Director of the West German Military Counterintelligence Service from 1955 to 1964, and is the father of the European civil servant Martin Selmayr.

== Honours ==
- Order of Merit of the Federal Republic of Germany (1999)
