= DG TREN =

DG TREN of the European Commission is now part of

- Directorate-General for Mobility and Transport (European Commission)
- Directorate-General for Energy (European Commission)
