= Ristori =

Ristori is a surname. Notable people with the surname include:

- Adelaide Ristori (1822–1906), Italian actress
- Dominique Ristori (born 1952), French bureaucrat
- Giovanni Alberto Ristori (1692–1753), Italian opera composer
