= Merit, excellence, and intelligence =

Framework for selecting job candidates

Merit, excellence, and intelligence (MEI) is an organizational framework that emphasizes selecting candidates based solely on their merit, achievements, skills, abilities, intelligence and contributions. It has been embraced by opponents of diversity, equity, and inclusion (DEI), a framework that seeks to rectify social inequalities through affirmative action.

Companies that have substituted their DEI programs for MEI include: Toyota, Meta, McDonald's, Walmart, Ford, Harley-Davidson, John Deere, Nissan, Tractor Supply Company, Amazon, and Boeing.

== History ==
The acronym of merit, excellence, and intelligence (MEI) was coined by Alexandr Wang, co-founder and CEO of Scale AI in a June 2024 blog post named “Meritocracy at Scale”.

We hire only the best person for the job, we seek out and demand excellence, and we unapologetically prefer people who are very smart, […] We treat everyone as an individual. We do not unfairly stereotype, tokenize, or otherwise treat anyone as a member of a demographic group rather than as an individual.

— Alexandr Wang, Meritocracy at Scale

While DEI opponents have praised his stance, Wang in his blog post said that he "strongly disagree[s]" with there being any conflict between meritocracy and diversity.

== Criticism ==
Criticism against MEI initiatives are largely based on a view that it does not adequately address issues of discrimination in employment, with many DEI advocates feeling that it does not recognize human biases in hiring that may lead to a less diverse and more homogenous workplace environment. Some critics believe that MEI overlooks "systemic barriers that persist [...]" and that it "marginaliz[es] those who do not fit into a homogenous, heteronormative mold", as a framework that is "pervasive among some white men in power who believe they deserve their privilege". It has additionally been criticised on the grounds that the "merit" described in MEI does not have a universal definition.

== See also ==
- Achievement ideology
- Civil service entrance examination
- Discrimination of excellence
- Diversity, equity, and inclusion (DEI)
- EU Concours
- Executive Order 14151
- Human resources
- Meritocracy
- Social mobility
- Students for Fair Admissions v. Harvard
