= European Personnel Selection Office =

Office of the European Union

(in other official languages)
Bulgarian	Европейска служба за подбор на персонал
Czech	Evropský úřad pro výběr personálu
Danish	Det Europæiske Personaleudvælgelseskontor
German	Europäisches Amt für Personalauswahl
Greek	Ευρωπαϊκή Υπηρεσία Επιλογής Προσωπικού
Spanish	Oficina Europea de Selección de Personal
Estonian	Euroopa Personalivaliku Amet
Finnish	Euroopan unionin henkilöstövalintatoimisto
French	Office européen de sélection du personnel
Irish	An Oifig Eorpach um Roghnú Foirne
Croatian	Europski ured za odabir osoblja
Hungarian	Európai Személyzeti Felvételi Hivatal
Italian	Ufficio europeo di selezione del personale
Lithuanian	Europos personalo atrankos tarnyba
Latvian	Eiropas Personāla atlases birojs
Maltese	L-Uffiċċju Ewropew għas-Selezzjoni tal-Persunal
Dutch	Europees Bureau voor personeelsselectie
Polish	Europejski Urząd Doboru Kadr
Portuguese	Serviço Europeu de Seleção do Pessoal
Romanian	Oficiul European pentru Selecţia Personalului
Slovak	Európsky úrad pre výber pracovníkov
Slovene	Evropski urad za izbor osebja
Swedish	Europeiska rekryteringsbyrån
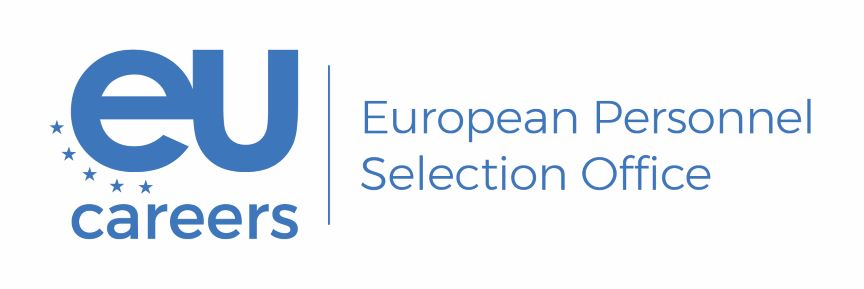

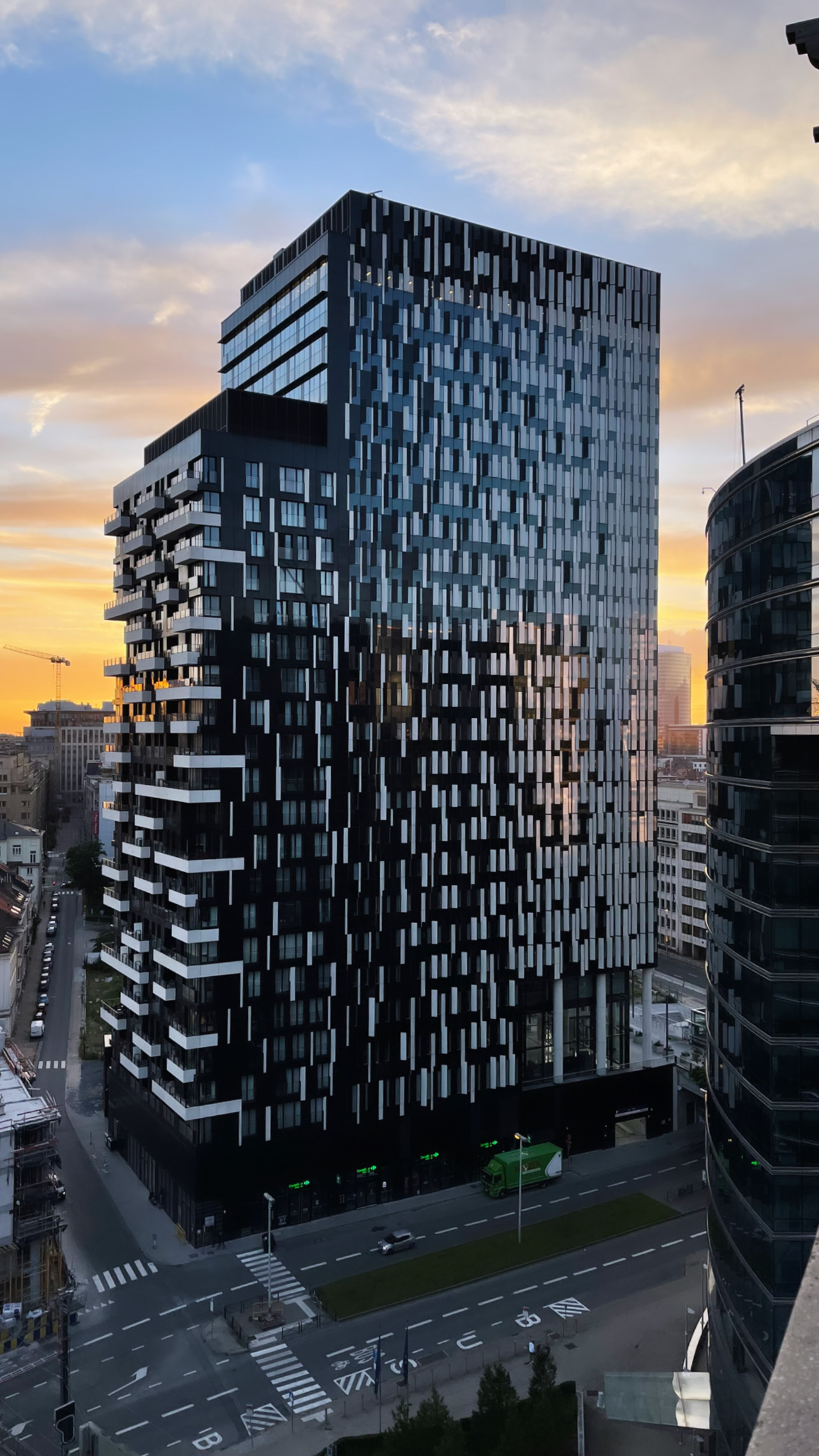
- Rue de la Loi 107, home to EPSO

Service overview
- Formed: 2002; 24 years ago
- Type: Interinstitutional body for civil service entrance examinations
- Jurisdiction: European Union
- Headquarters: Rue de la Loi 107, Brussels
- Employees: 120
- Annual budget: €29,390,000
- Service executive: Olivier Salles, Director
- Website: eu-careers.europa.eu

The European Personnel Selection Office (EPSO) is the interinstitutional office responsible for recruiting staff for the institutions, agencies and bodies of the European Union, including the Parliament, the General Secretariat of the Council, the Commission, the Court of Justice, the Court of Auditors, the Committee of the Regions, the Economic and Social Committee, the Data Protection Supervisor, the External Action Service and the Ombudsman. It does this by organising open competitions, known as the concours, the results of which permit it to draw up reserve lists of suitable candidates from which the institutions may then recruit. These open competitions are the gateway to permanent careers in the European civil service. On average, EPSO receives around 60,000-70,000 applications a year with around 1,500-2,000 successful candidates. Testing is carried in all 24 official languages of the Union, a unique system in the world. In addition to the permanent postings, EPSO manages a database of over 70,000 registered candidates for approximately 800 annual contractual positions (CAST).

== Organisation ==
Created in July 2002 and assuming full operational responsibilities in January 2003, EPSO is administratively attached to the European Commission - from which it receives its budget - but is governed by an interinstitutional management board, its highest decision-making body. This management board, which comprises one member per institution, approves the operational and organisational rules, as well as the principles governing selection policy. Its mandate is laid down in its Founding Decision from 2002: to organise 'open competitions with a view to securing the services of officials on optimal professional and financial terms' for the EU institutions. In 2026, the annual budget of EPSO amounts to €29.39 million, financed under the administrative expenditure of the Commission.

== Selection policy ==
=== Open Competitions ===
The selection of staff is based on a system of open competitions. They are organised by EPSO for permanent positions as career civil servants, and for a limited number of fixed term contracts in accordance with the Staff Regulations of the EU institutions, on the basis of harmonised criteria. EPSO cannot consider any application or CV submitted outside the framework of an official competition or selection procedure.

The details of an open competition are set out in a Notice of Competition, which is published in the Official Journal of the European Union and made available on the EPSO website. The Notice includes information on the selection criteria, the job profile and duties involved, the number of places on the reserve list, the qualifications and experience required, and the format of the tests at each stage of the selection process. EPSO runs competitions targeted towards both generalists (e.g. graduate administrators) and specialists (e.g. architecture, artificial intelligence, audit, cybersecurity, data management and data knowledge, data science, electrical engineering, financial management, ICT, international affairs, lawyer-linguists, taxation, translation). To reach a wider range of candidates in the Member States, additional information about open competitions may be published in the national press, specialised press or electronic media. EPSO also participates in recruitment fairs for graduates in the Member States.

The schedule of current and planned competitions is available on the EU Careers/EPSO Website.

=== Selection Criteria ===
The eligibility requirements for EPSO selection procedures vary depending on the profile sought. In general, EU citizenship and thorough knowledge of a EU language plus satisfactory knowledge of a second official EU language are required.

== Profiles sought ==
The majority of EU staff is made up of permanent civil servants, who are selected through a series of competitive examinations, commonly known as an open competition, which are organised by EPSO. However, many senior staff are recruited from outside the EU civil service.

The EU institutions also employ staff on a temporary basis and these are also selected by means of tests organised by EPSO.

The staff of the EU institutions fall into one of the following categories:

=== Permanent officials ===
Permanent staff is divided into three categories: administrators (AD), assistants (AST) and assistants-secretaries (AST-SC)

The work at the EU Institutions covers a huge range of areas and types of work. Graduate level administrators' work include formulating and negotiating draft EU laws, managing EU-wide programmes, or administering aid projects in the developing world. Equally, employees might also be participating in a specific scientific research programme, or for example, drafting the decision of the European Court of Justice or the European Ombudsman.

Assistants and Assistants-Secretaries contribute to implementing policies in various areas of EU activities or are responsible for secretarial and clerical work and ensuring the efficient operation of an administrative unit. They also play an important role in the internal management of the Institutions, notably in budgetary and financial affairs, HR, IT or librarianship.

=== Contract agents ===
EPSO also organises the selection of contract agents, who are employed for a temporary period with an initial contract running for a maximum of three to six years, depending on the type of the contract. Contract agents are recruited, for example, to do manual or administrative support–service tasks or provide additional capacity in specialised fields where officials with the required skills are not available.

=== Temporary agents ===
EPSO does not organise the selection of temporary agents. The institutions' vacancy notices and employee profiles are published on the EPSO Website and sent to the Permanent Representations of the Member States. Temporary agents may be employed to perform a range of highly specialised or temporary tasks for a maximum period of six years.

== Career opportunities ==
The European Civil Service offers a range of career opportunities throughout the European Union institutions. The majority of graduate opportunities are in administration and management, giving staff the opportunity to work in a variety of policy areas throughout their career. Each Notice of Competition provides a detailed description of the expected job content and qualifications or experience sought.

A job may involve participating in the EU legislative processes such as drafting a new legislation to tackle climate change, shaping EU's Energy policy, interpreting and applying EU law, analysing European markets to ensure free and fair competition, participating in operations providing humanitarian aid or monitoring the application of the Lisbon strategy to achieve the growth of the European knowledge based economy. Scientists and researchers form an important base for developing the EU's research and technological development policy. As in any international and multicultural organisation, the support tasks of Human Resources, Financial Management, IT and linguists are very challenging and important for the working of the institutions.

There are 24 official languages in the European Union; and so a variety of career opportunities are available to linguists (translators, interpreters, as well as lawyer-linguists (legal translators)), for example, interpreting the President of the European Parliament, the commission and allowing the citizens to read EU legislation, Court decisions and the European Parliament or the European Council debates in their mother tongue around the European Union.

Assistants may become administrators through an internal certification process and take on more responsibilities.

== Selection process ==
The selection procedures were reformed in 2010. The structure of each competition and the types of tests are described in detail in the Notice of Competition. After each stage in the competition, only the highest scoring candidates (usually a pre-determined number in the Notice) who have achieved a pass mark are admitted to the next stage.

When a competition is published, EU citizens are invited to apply electronically by creating their own EPSO account directly on the EPSO website. All communication with candidates is done electronically through their EPSO account. EPSO normally organises pre-selection tests in specialised test centres worldwide; therefore, candidates may select their preferred testing location at the time of online registration. The assessment phase is usually held in Brussels or Luxembourg.

A Selection Board, made up of representatives of the institutions and staff representatives, is responsible for approving the content of the questions and evaluating candidates at written and oral stages of the competition.

EPSO ensures that its selection procedures are fair and effective. In particular EPSO applies a policy of equal opportunities throughout the selection process. EPSO also ensures that applicants' personal data are processed in compliance with the rules on the protection of individuals with regard to the processing of personal data (Regulation (EC) No 45/2001 of the European Parliament and of the Council of 18 December 2000).

=== Stages of the competition ===
The selection procedure for permanent officials normally begins with Computer Based Testing (CBT) that comprises multiple-choice tests assessing candidates' knowledge of the European Union, and numerical, verbal and abstract reasoning skills and situational judgement.

Depending on the profile sought, intermediary tests can be organised, such as translation tests, E-tray, and Talent Screener (an in depth analysis of the candidates' files based on a series of specific questions).

In the assessment centre, there is normally a case study, oral presentation, group exercise and a competency-based interview. EPSO does not organise courses to prepare for the different stages of the competitions but candidates can follow the courses from companies where they have the chance to simulate the different tests.

For contract agents, the pre-selection stage is similar to that of the open competitions for permanent staff and consist of verbal, numerical and abstract reasoning. In addition, candidates may be asked to sit a third test to ascertain their specific competences relevant to the profile of the competition.

=== Recruitment ===
Recruitment is the sole responsibility of each individual institution. EPSO's task is to deliver and manage the reserve lists of qualified successful candidates. At the end of the selection process the highest-scoring candidates are placed on a reserve list for consideration by the institutions for specific vacancies. These reserve lists are published in the EPSO website and are normally valid for one to three years, with the possibility of extension.

== Language regime ==
In its judgment of 24 September 2015 (joined cases T‑124/13 and T‑191/13), the Court found EPSO's linguistic regime objectionable on the two grounds raised by the Italian and Spanish governments. Firstly, it held that it was unacceptable for EPSO not to communicate with candidates in languages other than the three working languages. In essence, the Court expects EPSO to ensure that candidates are able to submit their application in any of the 24 Official EU Languages and any EPSO correspondence with applicants must also be in the language they chose for their application. Secondly, the Court also annulled the requirement to choose English, French or German as the second language of the selection (essentially the language of the Assessment Centre phase). This again has been viewed as discrimination on the basis of language.

For generalist competitions, each candidate must indicate at least two official languages of the European Union (minimum level required: at least one language at level B2 or higher and one language at level C1 or higher). The languages for the tests will be selected based on the candidates' choices, taking into account the interests of the recruiting services and the Institutions.

In the second phase of application candidates have to indicate the two languages for the tests (chosen only from the languages previously declared during the first application phase):

- Language 1: language of the verbal, numerical and abstract reasoning tests – this can be any of the 24 EU languages for which the candidate had declared the required level (B2 level or above). This must be different from Language 2
- Language 2: language for the other tests (professional skills tests, e-tray and other assessment phase tests) and the application form during the second phase – this must be one of the five languages most frequently declared by all candidates that will be communicated to shortly after the closure of the first registration period. This language must be different from Language 1.

In order to include a maximum of applicants having one of the five vehicular languages allowed for above, candidates are invited to declare all official EU languages of which they have knowledge, including their main language. EPSO will then consolidate all application forms validated by the first deadline in order to rank the languages declared at B2 level or higher in descending order and compare these with the needs of the services to ensure an appropriate fit. The 5 languages in which the situational judgment test, e-tray and the assessment centre will take place (language 2) will be determined on this basis by EPSO acting as Appointing Authority.

== Equality of treatment ==
EPSO applies an equal opportunities policy and accepts applications without distinction on grounds of sex, race, colour, ethnic or social origin, genetic features, language, religion or belief, political or any other opinion, membership of a national minority, property, birth, disability, age or sexual orientation.

EPSO applies a policy of anonymity as a guarantee of equal treatment for candidates and its selection procedures are organised, to the greatest extent possible, to ensure equal treatment. The testing methods and test items are regularly assessed in terms of gender equality.

The Institutions do not organise personnel selection competitions specifically for persons with a disability. However, EPSO takes all reasonable measures that facilitate participation by persons with a disability in competitions on an equal basis with the other candidates. In practical terms, EPSO proactively seeks information from candidates on the nature of their disability and proactively adapts the administration of the tests to their needs. Facilities and variety of test administration options provided to disabled candidates include the tests in Braille, on paper, with extra time, and/or are being assessed in special facilities, and where appropriate, an individual invigilator is assigned to the candidate.

== Criticisms ==
The human resources policy of the EU institutions has been subject to much criticism. While there is a popular image of EU staff as over-paid, new employees may find this image hard to square with their own experience. Firstly, salaries and other benefits have been much reduced following a 2004 package of staff reforms; while salaries are relatively attractive to staff coming from new member states, the same cannot be said for many EU10 member state employees. This situation is aggravated by the EU refusal to recognise more than a minimal level of work experience earned outside the institutions, a particularly malign policy given that the average age of entry for AD5 ('graduate-level') staff in the commission is 34 years old (2009 Commission Human Resources Report).

Secondly, promotion prospects for administrators are extremely poor; the commission's own statistics reveal that an average career progression from AD5 to AD14 (Director level) takes 35–40 years, obviously unattainable for the average entrant who joins at 34 years old. It is not unusual to find staff in their 40s and 50s performing tasks that new graduates would carry out in more dynamic organisations. Management experience in the institutions is hard to gain, and further frustrates the possibilities for EU officials to attain senior management positions.

As EPSO only manages selection for the institutions it cannot be held responsible for staff career prospects. Instead, the challenge for EPSO is to improve the administration of open competitions – at present, a bafflingly random way of sifting through thousands of applications to place on a list of 'qualified candidates' (rather than, say, for specific vacancies). Successful laureates have no legal guarantee of recruitment, indeed many wait years on the reserve lists without ever being offered a position. EPSO has shortened the average length of the concours from around 15 months to between 5–9 months.

On 15 June, the Civil Service Tribunal of the European Union issued its ruling in case F-35/08, Pachtitis/Commission, which principally concerned the authority of the European Personnel Selection Office to set pre-selection tests. The cornerstone of the case was an interpretation of Annex III of the Staff Regulations, which led the Tribunal to conclude that only the Selection Board, and not EPSO, has the power to determine the content of questions for pre-selection test. Since the ruling pre-selection tests are organised under the responsibility of the Selection Board. Following the decision EPSO arranged a new competition for the approximately 36000 candidates who were excluded from the open competition EPSO/AD/177/10.

== Legal texts ==
- Decision 2002/620/EC of the European Parliament, the Council, the Commission, the Court of Justice, the Court of Auditors, the Economic and Social Committee, the Committee of the Regions and the European Ombudsman of 25 July 2002 establishing a European Communities Personnel Selection Office
- Decision 2002/621/EC of the Secretaries-General of the European Parliament, the Council and the Commission, the Registrar of the Court of Justice, the Secretaries-General of the Court of Auditors, the Economic and Social Committee and the Committee of the Regions, and the representative of the European Ombudsman of 25 July 2002 on the organisation and operation of the European Communities Personnel Selection Office
- Council Regulation No 31 (EEC), 11 (EAEC), laying down the Staff Regulations of Officials and the Conditions of Employment of Other Servants of the European Economic Community and the European Atomic Energy Community (Staff Regulations, consolidated version, current state)

== See also ==
- EU Concours
- Institutions of the European Union
- European Union
- European School of Administration
