= Jonathan Faull =

European Union official

Jonathan Faul KCMG
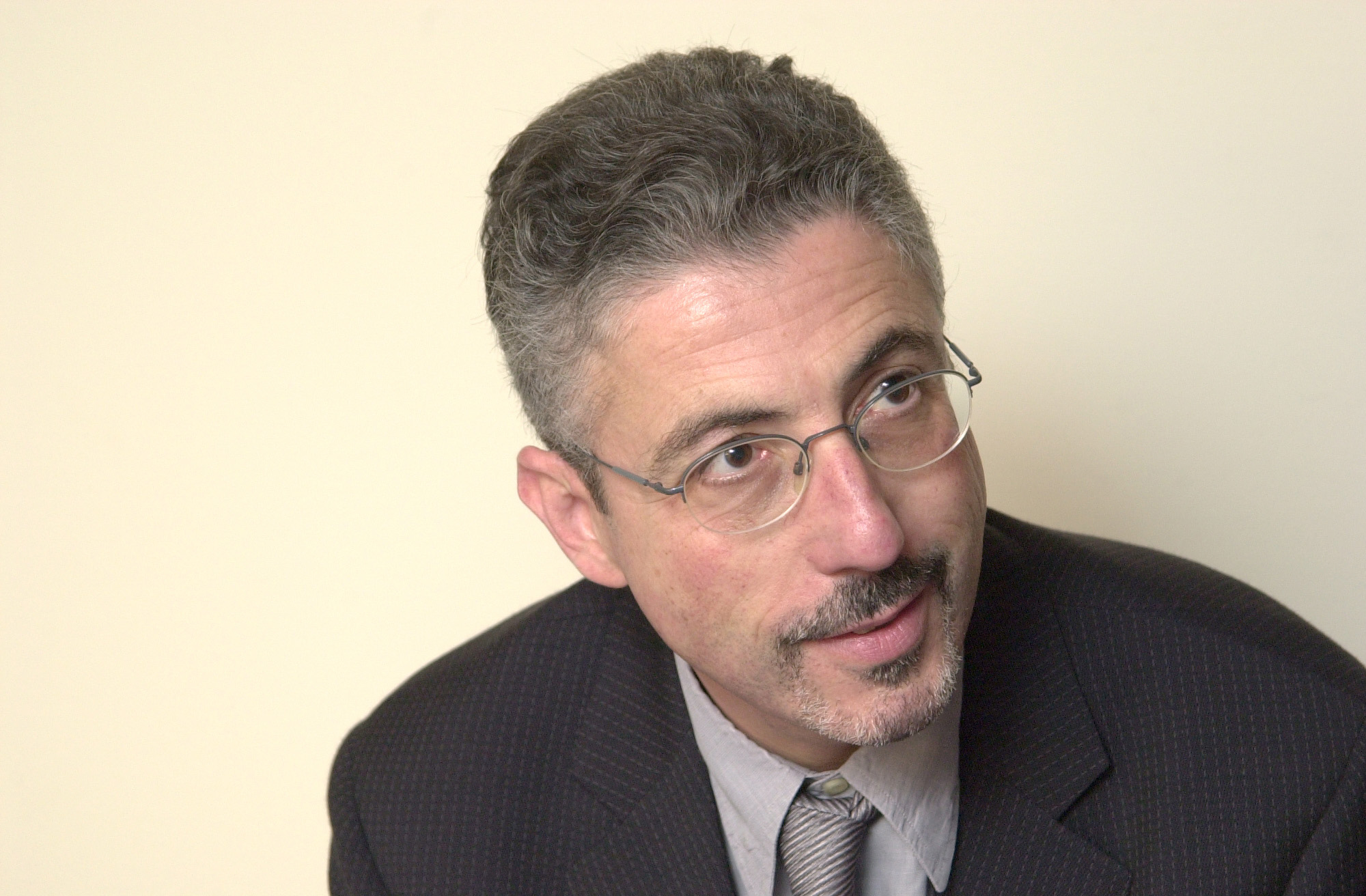
- Faull in 2002
- Born: 20 August 1954 (age 72); Chatham, Kent, England
- Education: University of Sussex; College of Europe
- Occupations: Professor of law; European Commission official

Sir Jonathan Michael Howard Faull KCMG (born 20 August 1954 in Chatham, Kent) is a former British official in the European Commission.

== Biography ==
Faull studied law at the University of Sussex and has an MA from the College of Europe in Bruges. He has been a visiting lecturer at Sciences Po, a visiting fellow of the University of Cambridge Centre for European Legal Studies, a visiting professor at the College of Europe since 2009 and Professor of Law at the Free University of Brussels since 1989.

He joined the European Commission in 1978, becoming Director for Competition Policy at the Directorate-General for Competition in 1995, Deputy Director-General in 1999 and Spokesman and Director-General of Press and Communication in 1999. He was Director-General of Justice and Home Affairs (later Justice, Freedom and Security) from 2003 to 2010.

He was Director-General of Internal Market and Services Directorate-General from 2010 to 2015. In the first half – Director-General for the Directorate-General for Financial Stability, Financial Services and Capital Markets Union which was formed from the DG Internal Market and Services Directorate-General.

On 24 June 2015, the European Commission announced that he would become the Director-General of a to-be-created "Task Force for Strategic Issues related to the UK Referendum" as of 1 September 2015.

He is a visiting professor at King's College London and a member of the boards of the Jacques Delors Institute in Paris and the Centre for European Reform in London.

Faull was appointed Knight Commander of the Order of St Michael and St George (KCMG) in the 2017 Birthday Honours.
