= European School of Administration =

Specialist training school for the European Union

- École européenne d'administration (French)
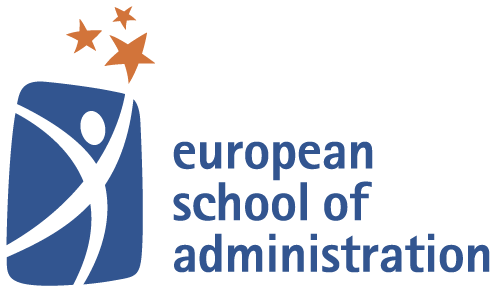

School overview
- Formed: 2005
- Type: Civil service school
- Jurisdiction: European Union
- Headquarters: Rue Philippe le Bon 3, Brussels
- Employees: 20
- Annual budget: €4,000,000
- School executive: Anna Mitelman, Head
- Parent body: EPSO

The European Administrative School (EuSA), also known as the European School of Administration, is an EU body founded in 2005 to provide specialist training to staff from all institutions of the European Union. It is part of the European Personnel Selection Office. It has two offices in Brussels and Luxembourg. It has around 20 staff and is responsible for an annual budget of approximately €4 million.

Unlike other similar schools, the EAS offers training to staff after recruitment, rather than training potential future staff. It also conducts training of staff who are being considered for promotion, and for some staff who are already working as administrative personnel.

The School has a cooperation agreement with the College of Europe, whereby the College delivers training programmes on its behalf to EU personnel.

The school has been described by a French government report as an "interesting model" for a "more open" scheme of training.
