= Bjoern Seibert =

German politician

Björn Seibert
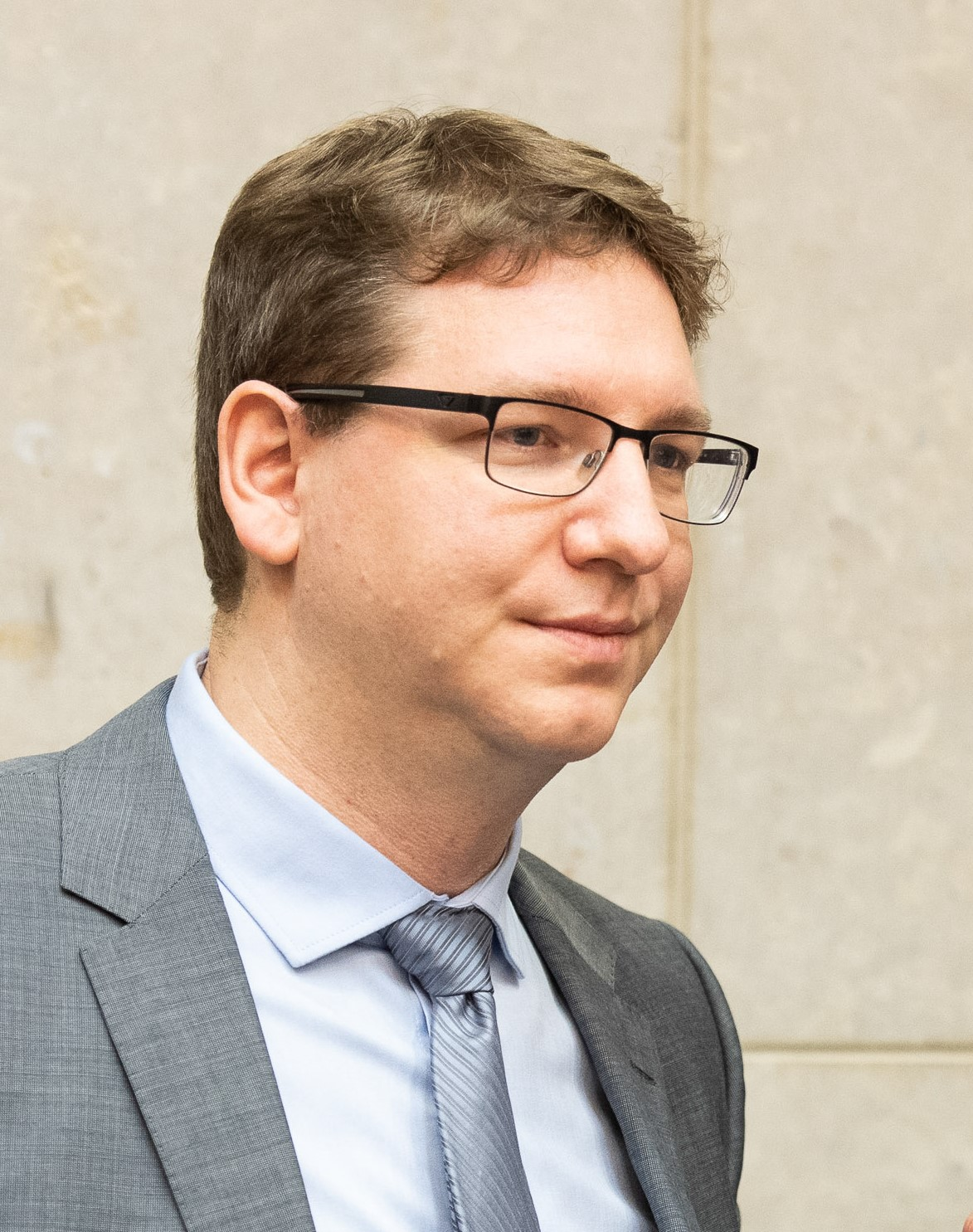

Chief of Staff to the President of the European Commission — Head of Cabinet
- Incumbent
- Assumed office 2019
- Appointed by: Ursula von der Leyen
- Preceded by: Martin Selmayr

Personal details
- Born: 1980 or 1981 (age 44–45) Germany
- Children: 2
- Education: Erfurt University

Björn H. Seibert is a European civil servant from Germany who is the current Head of Cabinet for Ursula von der Leyen, President of the European Commission. He's worked with von der Leyen since she was Defence Minister of Germany.

Reporting and analysis of Ursula von der Leyen’s presidency describe a greater concentration of coordination and control in the Commission President’s office; critics have alleged this included tighter control over commissioners’ cabinet staffing and communications.

== Education ==
Seibert graduated in social sciences from the University of Erfurt in 2005. He received a Master of Arts in Law and Diplomacy (MALD) from The Fletcher School of Law and Diplomacy at Tufts University in 2008.

== Career ==
In November 2007, while a MALD candidate at Tufts, Seibert authored an MIT Security Studies Program working paper, African Adventure? Assessing the European Union’s Military Intervention in Chad and the Central African Republic.

In 2008 he was a visiting fellow at the Royal United Services Institute (RUSI). In 2009 he was a non-resident fellow at the Center for Transatlantic Relations at the Paul H. Nitze School of Advanced International Studies (SAIS), Johns Hopkins University.

In 2010, the U.S. Army War College’s Strategic Studies Institute published Seibert’s monograph Operation EUFOR TCHAD/RCA and the European Union’s Common Security and Defense Policy. That same year he was a visiting scholar at the Weatherhead Center for International Affairs at Harvard University.

=== German Ministry of Defense ===
In 2012, the University of Cambridge’s talks archive listed him as part of the Policy Planning and Advisory Staff of the German Ministry of Defence in connection with a Cambridge-hosted event. During von der Leyen’s tenure as Germany’s minister of defence (2013–2019), he was an official in the German defence ministry under her.

Seibert worked in the German Ministry of Defence during a period subject to federal investigations over poor management and nepotism. Seibert was called to testify before an investigative committee of the German parliament into how contracts from the ministry, under then Minister Ursula von der Leyen, were awarded to outside consultants without proper oversight. During the investigations, Siebert claimed not to remember anything from the period.

=== European Commission ===
Seibert played a key role in whipping a majority in the European Parliament to confirm von der Leyen as President of the Commission following her election by the European Council. In 2020, Seibert and von der Leyen were criticized for creating a large backlog of high-level and senior position vacancies at the Commission due to their insistence on having personal control over the appointments. Over 70 director, director general or deputy director general jobs were unfilled as well as over 80 mid-level positions. Over 21% of senior positions across departments were vacant in mid-October according to Politico. He has been criticized for his role as leader of von der Leyen's advisers due to them not taking much input from people outside this inner circle, including from her commissioners.

After Russia invaded Ukraine in 2022, Seibert was "critical" to the successful European negotiations with the United States regarding international sanctions on Russia. According to an EU diplomat cited by the Financial Times, he was "the only one [that had] an overview on the EU and in constant contact with the US".

== Personal life ==
Seibert is married and has two children.
