= Achievement ideology =

Concept in sociology

Achievement ideology is the belief that one reaches a socially perceived definition of success through hard work and education. In this view, factors such as gender, race/ethnicity, economic background, social networks, or neighborhoods/geography are secondary to hard work and education or are altogether irrelevant in the pursuit of success.

== Contemporary analysis ==
In 2002, Sandra L. Barnes, offered that people who believe in the American achievement ideology most likely blame underachievement on attitudinal or moral differences among individuals. For those who disagree with the achievement ideology, this difference in attitude is most likely the result of an oppositional response to negative institutional and structural forces. In her study, Barnes found that those who most benefit from achievement ideology (white males in higher class neighborhoods, for example) are most likely to espouse the achievement ideology. For example, African Americans are more likely than whites to believe that race is an ascribed trait that helps some achieve success more easily than others, and those with higher incomes are more likely to claim that having a strong social network is an unimportant factor for success. All respondent groups, however, believe that education and hard work are most important for success, proving that achievement ideology is alive and well. Ultimately, Barnes argues that success is best reached when one has an achievement-oriented attitude coupled with the actual ability to accomplish one's goals. While most people might have the proper attitude, structural factors can keep them from achieving.

Donna Y. Ford sought to discover the differences in ideologies between male and female and gifted and nongifted African American students. Ford describes four theories related to achievement ideology – need achievement, test anxiety, social learning and attribution theories:

=== Need achievement theory ===
Social scientists who advocate this theory believe that one's achievement is a product of the motivation to succeed and the motivation to avoid failure. This means that individuals weigh their expectancy of success with the value they place on that success, or, how well an individual thinks they can do and how much doing well actually matters.

=== Test anxiety theory ===
As with need achievement theory, social scientists who support test anxiety theory look to how a student evaluates her/his ability to succeed. Students who are preoccupied with the outcome of their performance, who fear failure or humiliation if they do not perform well, might not perform well because this anxiety stifles their performance.

=== Social learning theory ===
According to social learning theory, students are socialized from an early age and hold different expectations or values based on their own experience or social situation. Students who are raised in an atmosphere of underachievement, who often see previous generations and family members not succeed, will most likely internalize these values and perceive their own success as unlikely.

=== Attribution theory ===
This theory explains a lack of motivation in students as a result of the students' belief in achievement ideology. When students attribute their own failure to a lack of ability, they consequently are less likely to expect to do well. If a student fully believes in the achievement ideology, failure can only be a result of lack of ability or lack of effort.

Ford claims that, while these four theories may explain underachievement in some students, they only focus on students' lack of motivation to achieve and do not consider a student's failure despite her/his desire to achieve. She describes this as the "paradox of underachievement," a discrepancy between a student's ideology and their actual achievement (i.e., when students do not do well in school despite their support of the achievement ideology). In her study, the majority of both gifted and nongifted African American students claimed that school is "very important." The majority of male and female African American students alike responded that school was important or very important. If this is true that most students are, in fact, motivated and view school as important for success, a student's failure must be explained by some other variable—most likely ascribed variables like race/ethnicity, gender, and so on.

== Effects in the workplace ==
Belief in the American achievement ideology causes employers to look to an individual's educational success as the key factor in hiring potential employees because achievement ideology perpetuates the notion that those who have succeeded educationally are the most hard working. In Education and Jobs, Ivar Berg writes, "The increase in educational requirements for middle-level jobs…may thus be taking place at some cost to a society that has historically prided itself on its mobility opportunities." This process causes America's education system to act more like a "licensing agency" rather than promoting education for education's sake. This, in turn, causes many employees to be overqualified for their jobs.

When jobs gradually require higher and higher educational attainment as a prerequisite, the effort put into achieving these prerequisites (or, the effort put into school) does not equal the needed effort or skill at one's job. Thus, workers' endorsement of achievement ideology decreases each year that they remain in a particular job for which they are overqualified. In other words, employees begin to see the effort they put forth in school as unnecessary.

== Reasons for endorsing or rejecting achievement ideology ==
Jay MacLeod studied two groups of boys and young men who lived in a low-income neighborhood for his book, Ain't No Makin' It. The "Hallway Hangers," a group of mostly white boys, did not endorse meritocracy, the American achievement ideology. MacLeod found that their skepticism was a result of several factors. First, although the Hallway Hangers' parents wanted their children to do well, they knew from their own experience that encouraging high aspirations would only set them up for failure and disappointment. Both parents and children were affected by the environment of underachievement.

The Hallway Hangers and their parents rejected the achievement ideology because they did not see job success through hard work to be a likely outcome in their situation, a situation in which few family members ever succeeded financially, where job opportunities were few and where hard work in school rarely influenced employability. Moreover, if the Hallway Hangers were to accept the achievement ideology, this would logically entail the belief that their parents had not succeeded financially because they were lazy or unintelligent. The Hallway Hangers knew this was not true. Ironically, though the Caucasian Hallway Hangers understood that the achievement ideology was false in their case, they were not able to understand that it was equally false in the case of African Americans. The Hallway Hangers were kept from this understanding by their belief in another powerful American ideology, that of racism and the intellectual inferiority of Blacks. Their racism sustained and in turn was bolstered by their sense that their own success was impeded because racial minorities received special treatment from programs such as Affirmative Action that gave Blacks an unfair advantage. Therefore, whereas the Hallway Hangers recognized that they failed to succeed financially because of their position in the lower class, they could not see that class exploitation was also responsible for the financial failure of African Americans. In addition to attributing inferiority to African Americans, the Hallway Hangers also scapegoated them, blaming them for taking all of the jobs that they, as white, believed they deserved.

MacLeod's analysis is completed by the analysis of a second group that called itself "The Brothers". Composed of African-American young men, The Brothers lived in the same housing project as the Hallway Hangers. They, however, did endorse meritocracy, the American ideology of achievement. The Brothers understood the racial situation in America to have been vastly improved since the time of their parents. This led them to the belief that each generation of Blacks had worked harder than the last: if they did the same, they would be able to do well in school and succeed in the workforce. Though The Brothers lived in the same housing project, they had done so for far less time than the Hallway Hangers. Some of the Hallway Hangers' families had resided in "Clarendon Heights" for three generations. Many of The Brothers had moved to the housing project from far worse situations and even poorer neighborhoods. Their recent arrival caused them to think that they were upwardly mobile. Due to their optimism, they were much more likely than the Hallway Hangers to find viable employment after school. Their belief in meritocracy, and their hard work in school, for a time allowed them to overcome the racism and class structures that defeated their aspirations in the outside world. In contrast to the Hallway Hangers, the Brothers graduated from high school and did not get arrested. They knew that the Hallway Hangers' ideology of racial inferiority was false, but often blamed themselves when they did not do better in school even after working hard. MacLeod notes that unlike the Hallway Hangers, the Brothers were less conscious of how "the deck was stacked against them." Their acceptance of the achievement ideology meant that they turned the blame on themselves rather than on the inequality of the larger social structures. In this way, acceptance of the achievement ideology contributes to the continuation of structural inequality.

MacLeod explains the Brothers' mediocre grades by introducing Pierre Bourdieu's concept of cultural capital, and describes how schools systematically valorize the skills and knowledge of the upper class while deprecating the cultural capital of the lower class. Though all the Brothers initially believe in the concept of the achievement ideology, as they enter the workforce, they find themselves subject to the racism and classism that they had previously underestimated.

MacLeod had predicted the Brothers would do much better than the Hallway Hangers given that they conformed to rather than rejected societal expectations. But only Craig and Mike, the white members, attained a degree of success by mainstream standards. According to MacLeod, several of the Brothers still retained faith in the achievement ideology, but were "hard pressed to parlay their academic credentials into economic prosperity" given the enduring structural and cultural inequalities.

== See also ==
- The American Dream, a US-specific example of achievement ideology
- Achieved status
- Hustle culture
- Life stance
- Merit, excellence, and intelligence (MEI) – framework that emphasizes selecting candidates based solely on their merit, achievements, skills, abilities, intelligence and contributions
- Mindset §Fixed and growth mindsets
- Myth of meritocracy
- Protestant work ethic
- Work–life balance
