= Dominique Ristori =

French civil servant (born 1952)

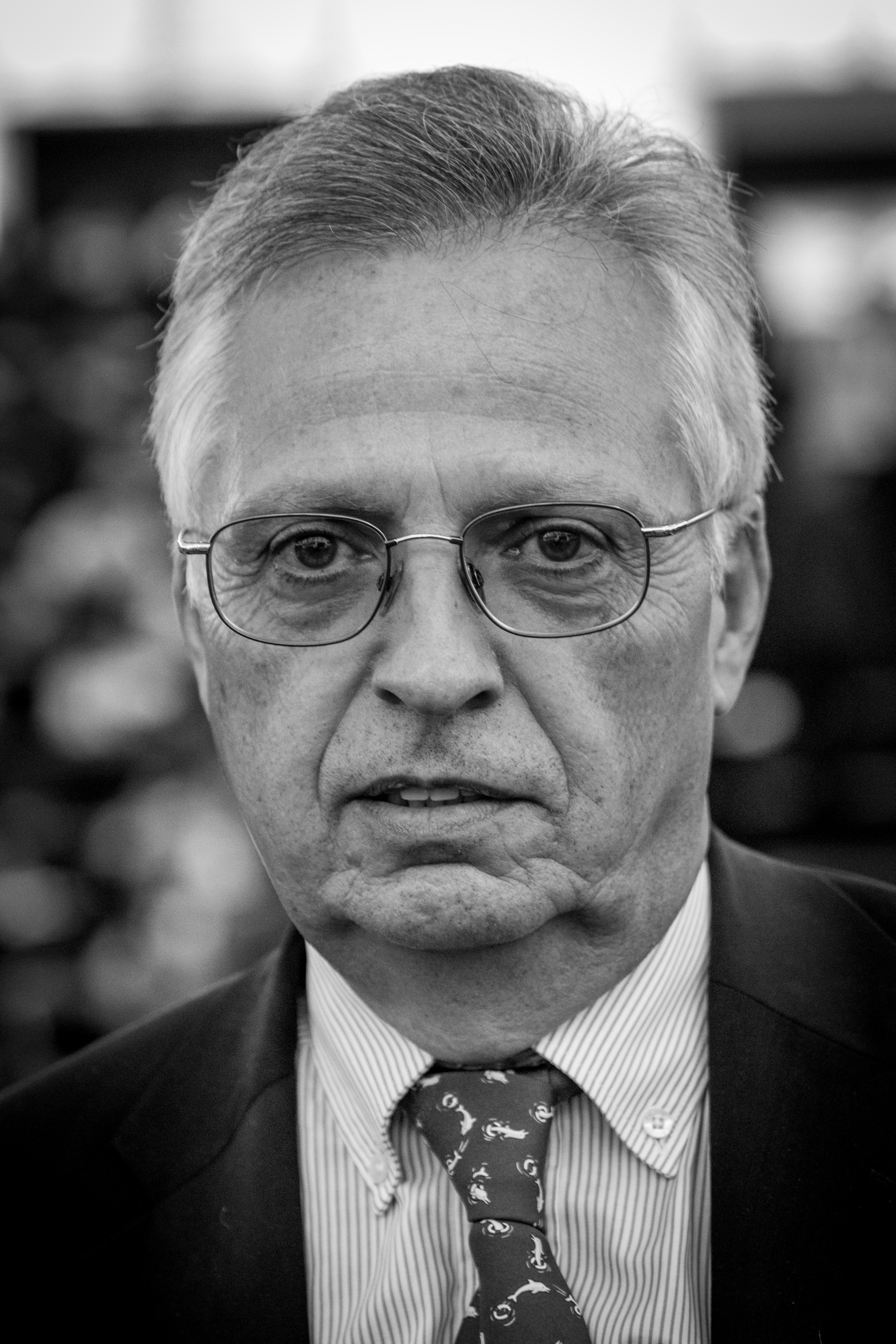
Dominique Ristori, 2013.

Dominique Ristori (born 12 March 1952 in Toulon) is a European civil servant from France. From January 2014 to August 2019, Ristori was the director-general of the Directorate-General for Energy within the European Commission.

== Career ==
In 1973 Ristori became a Bachelor of Law (Licencié en Droit) and gained a Certificate in International Studies from the University of Nice. In 1975 he became a graduate of Sciences Po Paris.

Ristori entered the European Civil Service in 1978 as assistant to the director and then to the director-general at the Personnel and Administration Directorate-General (DG ADMIN). In 1990 he became Head of Division in charge of Transnational cooperation between SMEs at the Directorate-General for Enterprise Policy (DG ENTR). From May 1996 to December 1999 Ristori was the Director in charge of European Energy Policy at the Directorate-General for Energy (ENER). From January 2000 to July 2006 he was the Director in charge of General Affairs and Resources at the Directorate-General for Energy and Transport (TREN). From 2006 to 2010 he was the European Commission's Deputy Director General for Energy and Transport, in charge of nuclear energy policy.

He was over the period from December 2010 to December 2013 the Director General of the Joint Research Centre of the European Commission.

In January 2014 Ristori was appointed as the chief of the Directorate-General for Energy, succeeding Phillip Lowe. His appointment was extended in February 2018, with unanimous decision of the College of Commissioners, as he had passed the retirement age of 65. He was replaced by Ditte Juul-Jørgensen in August 2019.

== Family ==
Ristori is married to Irène Souka, from 2008 to 2020 leader of the Directorate-General for Human Resources and Security at the European Commission.

== Award ==
- Officer of the Legion of Honour (2019). Knight (2008)
