= German Intelligence Community =

Intelligence services

The German Intelligence Community is the collective of intelligence agencies in Germany. Germany has three federal intelligence services and 16 state intelligence services. Because they do not form a single entity and because their responsibilities are split between multiple government ministries and even jurisdictions, this is an informal term for all government agencies and components with intelligence duties, used by commentators, scholars and journalists.

The three federal intelligence agencies are:

- Federal Intelligence Service (BND), which is responsible for foreign and strategic intelligence. Additionally, they support the German Armed Forces with military intelligence. Their primary methods of collection are human intelligence, signals intelligence and geospatial intelligence. This is a sharp break with their American and British counterparts, where an intelligence agency mostly specializes on one of these collection methods. The BND is directly subordinated to the German Chancellery, Directorate-General 7.
- Federal Office for the Protection of the Constitution (BfV). It is a domestic intelligence agency and tasked with detecting threats to the German state in the form of religious extremism, political extremism and organized crime. Additionally, it is the primary counterintelligence agency of Germany, working to secure classified information, government facilities and private businesses against espionage, sabotage and cyberattacks. The BfV is subordinated to the Federal Ministry of the Interior. Besides the BfV, every German state has its own State Office for the Protection of the Constitution (Landesverfassungsschutzämter), which is not subordinated to any federal ministry or agency.
- Military Counterintelligence Service (MAD). Its duties are much the same as those of the BfV, except limited to the German Armed Forces. They also analyze tactical intelligence relevant to deployed German troops. As such, they fall within the jurisdiction of the Federal Ministry of Defence. However, they do not conduct traditional military intelligence, which is done by other military branches, as well as the BND.

The Strategic Reconnaissance Command (KSA) is the central headquarters for military intelligence of the German Bundeswehr.

Other state agencies that use intelligence techniques or collect data, such as the Federal Criminal Police Office (BKA), the German Customs Investigation Bureau (ZKA), the Financial Intelligence Unit (FIU) or the Federal Office for Information Security (BSI) are not officially regarded as member of the German Intelligence Community, although they do participate in coordinative institutions, such as the Joint Centre for Counterterrorism and -extremism (GETZ).

The activities of the three federal intelligence agencies are coordinated out of the German Chancellery by the Commissioner for the Federal Intelligence Services and Directorate-General 7. Furthermore, they are subject to parliamentary oversight through the Parliamentary Oversight Panel (PKGr). In cases where the agencies want to surveil electronic communications, they have to get permission by the G10-Commission, which acts much like the FISA Court.

The traditional primary focus of the German Intelligence Community, originally the West German Intelligence Community, was the threat posed by the Soviet Union and its satellite states. The German Intelligence Community has been closely aligned with the United States Intelligence Community, especially the CIA, since the start of the Cold War.
