= Catherine Day (civil servant) =

Irish civil servant (born 1954)

Secretary General of the European Commission
- In office 10 November 2005 – 1 September 2015
- President: José Manuel Barroso; Jean-Claude Juncker
- Preceded by: David O'Sullivan
- Succeeded by: Alexander Italianer

Personal details
- Born: 16 June 1954 (age 72) Dublin, Ireland
- Education: University College Dublin

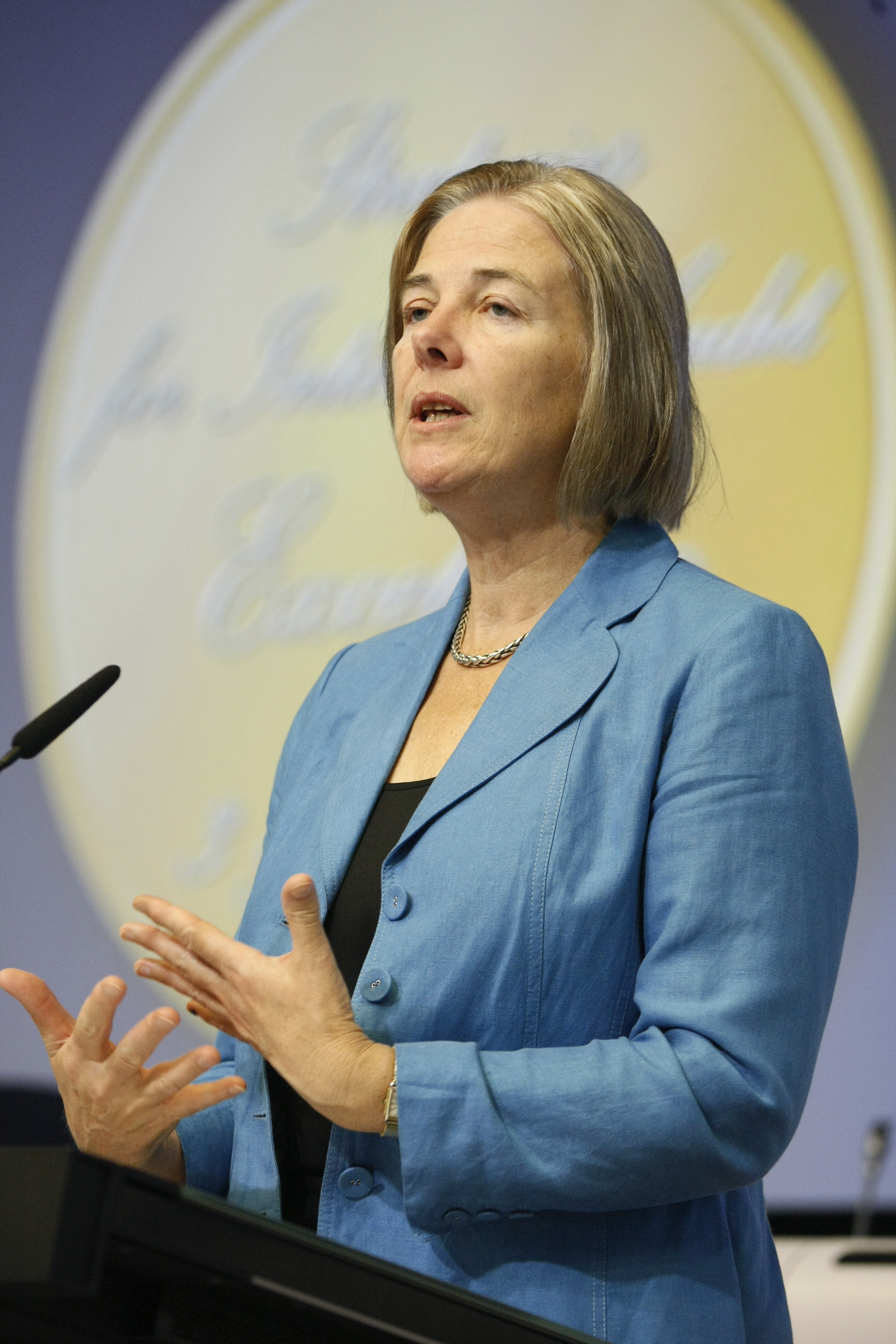
Catherine Day, Secretary-General of the EC, speaking during the 2011 annual conference of the Internal Audit Service of the EC (IAS), which was organised on 3 and 4 October 2011.

Catherine Elizabeth Day (born 16 June 1954 in Mount Merrion, Dublin) is a former European civil servant from Ireland. Appointed in November 2005 as Secretary-General of the European Commission, she served two terms with President Jose Manuel Barroso and continued with his successor, Mr Jean-Claude Juncker until she retired in September 2015. She was the first woman to hold the post of Secretary General of the European Commission.

== Education ==
Day has a B.A. in economics (1974) and an M.A. in international trade and economic integration (1975) from University College Dublin.

== Career ==
After graduation Day worked in Dublin, first in the Investment Bank of Ireland and then in the Confederation of Irish Industry.

=== European roles ===
In 1979 Day joined the European Commission following an open competition. She started work in the Industry DG of the commission and then worked in cabinets of Mr Richard Burke (1982-1984), Mr Peter Sutherland (1985-1989) and Sir Leon Brittan (1989-1996) whom she served as deputy chef de Cabinet.

In the mid-1990s she worked on the enlargement of the European Union to the countries of central and eastern Europe. She chaired the Association Committees with candidate countries and was one of the architects of the pre-accession process. In 2000 she was appointed as deputy director general in the DG for External Relations, serving under Commissioner Chris Patten. She was responsible for policy in the Balkans and wider European including Russia and the NIS.

In 2002 she was appointed Director General for Environment, serving under Commissioners Margot Wallström and Stavros Dimas. She was deeply involved in developing the commission's REACH legislation on chemicals and in developing its climate and renewable energy strategies.

In November 2005 she was appointed secretary-general of the European Commission. During her term of office she developed the role of the secretariat-general in cross-commission policy co-ordination, its better regulation and impact assessment/policy evaluation approach and was a key negotiator of the 2014-2020 multi-annual financial framework for the EU budget. She also led the commission's work on the European Semester, co-ordinating EU and national economic and social policies. She was succeeded as secretary general by Mr Alexander Italianer in September 2015.

Through 2018 Day served as special adviser to European Commission President Jean-Claude Juncker

=== Governance roles ===
Day chaired the governing body of University College Cork from 2015 until January 2019. Since September 2017 she has chaired the board of trustees of the Chester Beatty Library in Dublin which is a government appointment. She is on the board of European Movement Ireland and the Institute of International and European Affairs. She is a member of the Royal Irish Academy.

From 2017 to 2019, Day chaired an independent review group on the role of voluntary organisations in publicly funded health services in Ireland.

In October 2019, Day was appointed chair of the Irish Citizens' Assembly on Gender Equality.

In December 2019 Day was appointed chair of the Expert Group on Direct Provision.

== Honours ==
- Grand officer of the Order of Leopold.
- She has honorary doctorates from University College Dublin, Griffith College Dublin and the University of Limerick.
- President of Ireland Distinguished Service Award 2014
- Garret Fitzgerald Gold Medal for International Relations 2015
- UCD Foundation Medalist 2015.

Government offices
Preceded by David O'Sullivan	Secretary General of the European Commission; 2005–2015	Succeeded by Alexander Italianer
