= Strategic Reconnaissance Command =

- Kommando Strategische Aufklärung
- Intern emblem of KdoStratAufkl
- Active: 16 January 2002
- Country: Germany
- Branch: Bundeswehr
- Type: Military intelligence
- Garrison/HQ: Grafschaft, North Rhine-Westphalia, Germany
- Engagements: NATO intervention in Bosnia; Kosovo War; Operation Enduring Freedom; War in Afghanistan; TF K-Bar; Operation Anaconda; Northern Afghanistan

Commanders
- Current commander: Major general Werner Sczesny

The Strategic Reconnaissance Command (German: Kommando Strategische Aufklärung or KdoStratAufkl; KSA) is the central headquarters for military intelligence of the German Bundeswehr, based in Grafschaft, North Rhine-Westphalia, Germany.

The KSA was founded in January 2002 as a central command of all military intelligence abilities of Bundeswehr. Before that military intelligence was separated in each of the military branches (Air Force, Army, Navy). The capabilities include "satellite-based imaging reconnaissance" (SARLupe), "telecommunications and electronic reconnaissance", electronic warfare, area of "object analysis" and operative communication.

The command works closely with the Federal Intelligence Service (BND). For military counterintelligence the Military Counterintelligence Service (MAD) is responsible. The KSA is also responsible for the joint development of military intelligence and training.

Since July 2017 the KSA is under the command of the new formed Cyber and Information Domain Service (Kommando Cyber- und Informationsraum).

== Organisation ==
  - Strategic Reconnaissance Command (Kommando Strategische Aufklärung KSA), in Gelsdorf
    - 911th Electronic Warfare Battalion
    - 912th Electronic Warfare Battalion, mans the Oste-class SIGINT/ELINT and reconnaissance ships
    - 931st Electronic Warfare Battalion
    - 932nd Electronic Warfare Battalion, provides airborne troops for operations in enemy territory
    - Bundeswehr Strategic Reconnaissance School
    - Bundeswehr Operational Communications Center
    - Cyber-Operations Center
    - Electronic Warfare Analysis Center
    - Central Imaging Reconnaissance, operating the SAR-Lupe satellites
    - Central Bundeswehr Investigation Authority for Technical Reconnaissance
