= European Commission Data Protection Officer =

The European Commission Data Protection Officer is a position in the European Commission responsible for independently ensuring the application, within the Commission, of Regulation 45/2001 regarding data protection.

Further, the Officer maintains a register of all operations processing personal data, containing information on the purpose and conditions of operations, being available to the public (the register is available online).

== See also ==
- European Data Protection Supervisor
