= Alexander Italianer =

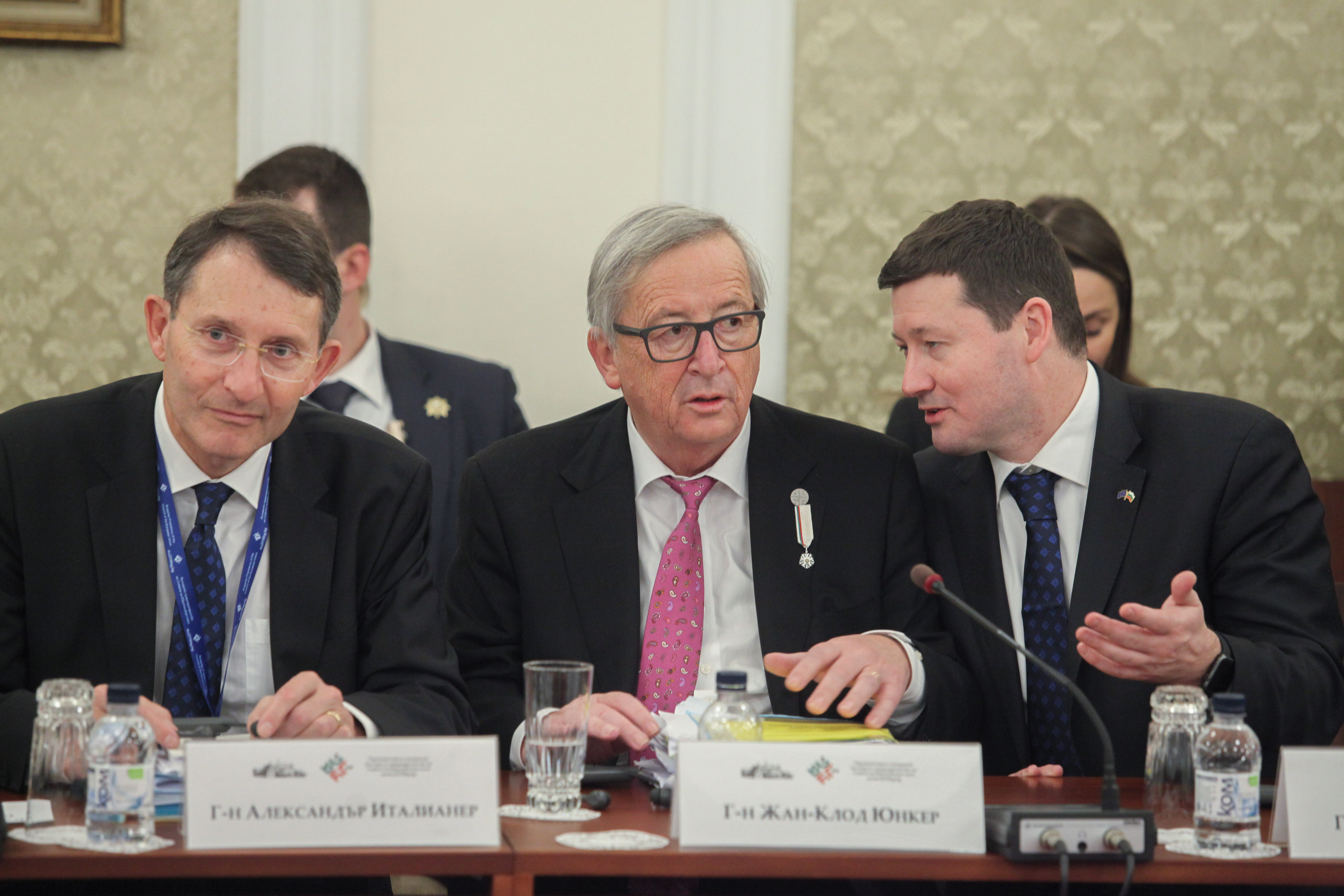
- Alexander Italianer (left) with European Commission President Jean-Claude Juncker (middle) and his successor as Commission Secretary-General, Martin Selmayr (right), in 2018

Secretary-General of the European Commission
- In office 1 September 2015 – 1 March 2018
- President: Jean-Claude Juncker
- Preceded by: Catherine Day
- Succeeded by: Martin Selmayr

Personal details
- Born: 16 March 1956 (age 70) London, United Kingdom
- Education: University of Groningen

Alexander Italianer (born 16 March 1956) is a retired European civil servant from the Netherlands who served as Secretary-General of the European Commission from 2015 to 2018.

== Biography ==
Alexander Italianer was born in 1956 in London, United Kingdom, the son of Dutch diplomat Franz Italianer. He was educated in the Netherlands, completing high school in Leiden. He graduated in econometrics at the University of Groningen in 1980, and received his PhD in economics at the same university in 1986. Between 1980 and 1985 he was an assistant at the Catholic University of Leuven.

In 1985 he became a civil servant at the European Commission; first as an advisor, then as head of the administrative unit of the Directorate-General for Economic and Financial Affairs. He worked in the Cabinet of Commission President Jacques Santer during the Santer Commission (1995–1999) and became a Cabinet Head under Günter Verheugen. In 2002, he was promoted to Director of the Directorate-General Economic and Financial Affairs. Subsequent positions include Cabinet Head to Commissioner Pavel Telička and Deputy Cabinet Head for the President of the European Commission José Manuel Barroso (2004 until 2006) and Deputy Secretary-General (2006 until 2010). After being the Director-General of the Directorate-General for Competition from 2010 until 2015, he became Secretary-General of the European Commission on 1 September 2015, a position he held until 1 March 2018. In 2018 he retired from the European Commission.

In 2019 he took a position as an international policy advisor for the American law firm Arnold & Porter.

== Publications ==
Italianer has published more than 50 articles and 3 books about the Economic and Monetary Union of the European Union, integration economics, labour, energy, macroeconomics and international trade.

=== Books and monographies ===
- Alexander Italianer, Theory and Practice of International Trade Linkage Models. Springer 1986.
- Michel Catinat, Eric Donni and Alexander Italianer, The completion of the internal market : results of macroeconomic model simulations. European Commission 1988.
- Alexander Italianer and M. Vanheukelen, De voltooiing van de Europese interne markt in een mondiale context. KULeuven, 1989.
- Peter Bekx, Anne Bucher and Alexander Italianer, The QUEST Model (version 1988). European Commission, 1989.
- Alexander Italianer, 1992, Hype Or Hope: a Review. European Commission 1990.
- Michael Emerson, Daniel Gros, Alexander Italianer et al., Marché unique, monnaie unique. Economica 1991.
- Michael Emerson, Daniel Gros, Alexander Italianer et al., One Market, One Money. An Evaluation of the Potential Benefits and Costs of Forming an Economic and Monetary Union. Oxford University Press, 1992.

== See also ==
- European Civil Service

Government offices
Preceded by Catherine Day	Secretary General of the European Commission; 2015–2018	Succeeded by Martin Selmayr
