= Martin Selmayr =

Former Secretary-General of the European Commission

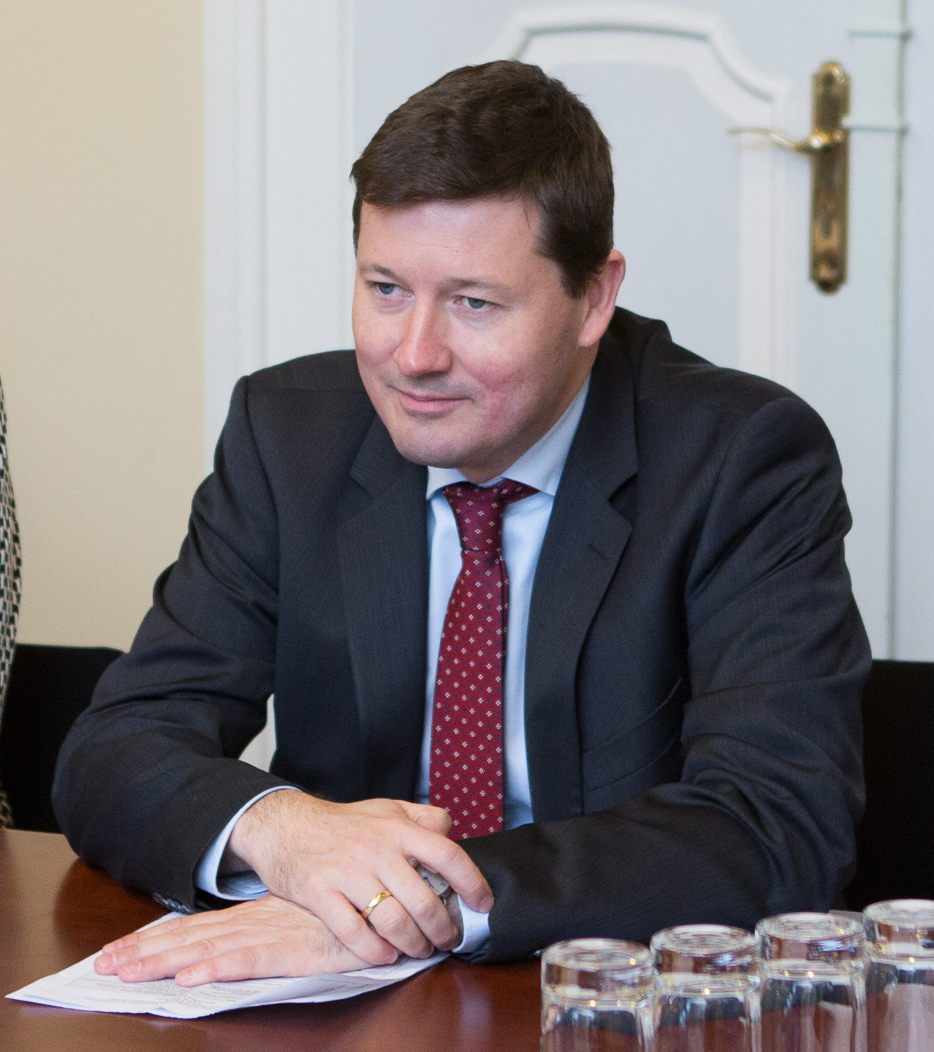

Secretary-General of the European Commission
- In office 1 March 2018 – 1 August 2019
- President: Jean-Claude Juncker
- Preceded by: Alexander Italianer
- Succeeded by: Ilze Juhansone

Chief of Staff to the President of the European Commission
- In office 1 November 2014 – 1 March 2018
- Succeeded by: Bjoern Seibert
- Appointed by: Jean-Claude Juncker

Personal details
- Born: 5 December 1970 (age 55) Bonn, West Germany (now Germany)
- Party: Christian Democratic and Flemish
- Relatives: Gerhard Selmayr (father); Josef Selmayr (grandfather)
- Education: University of Geneva; University of Passau

Martin Selmayr (born 5 December 1970) is a European civil servant from Germany who was Secretary-General of the European Commission from 2018 to 2019 and chief of staff to Commission President Jean-Claude Juncker from 2014 to 2018. During his time in the Juncker Commission, Selmayr was widely described as one of the most influential figures within the European Union. After taking office as secretary-general, he was described in a debate in the European Parliament as "the most powerful bureaucrat in the world." A resident of Brussels since 2000, he is a member of the Christian Democratic and Flemish (CD&V) party of Belgium. He is considered by many to be close to the Christian Democratic Union of Germany and its leadership, but the European Commission said he has never been a member of that party.

== Early life and career ==
Selmayr studied law at the University of Geneva, before earning his PhD at the University of Passau. He worked for the European Central Bank from 1998 to 2000, before joining the media conglomerate Bertelsmann as a legal adviser in Brussels in 2001. He eventually became Bertelsmann's vice president for legal affairs and government relations and head of the Brussels office.

== European Commission ==
In 2004, he first joined the European Commission as a civil servant. He went on to serve in a variety of roles, firstly as Commission Spokesperson for Information Society and Media, before becoming head of cabinet to the Commissioner for Justice, Fundamental Rights and Citizenship, Viviane Reding. He was appointed by the commission, as a principal adviser to the Directorate-General for Economic and Financial Affairs, and as a director at the European Bank for Reconstruction and Development.

In early 2014, Jean-Claude Juncker won the nomination of the European People's Party (EPP) to be their candidate for President of the European Commission. Juncker appointed Selmayr his campaign director, and after the EPP emerged as the largest party in the European Parliament following the election in May 2014, Selmayr became the head of the Juncker transition team. After taking office as president on 1 November 2014, Juncker made Selmayr his head of cabinet and chief of staff.

Shortly after his appointment, various media reports began to profile Selmayr as a highly influential figure within EU politics, with Politico describing him as "the most powerful EU chief of staff ever" in November 2016, noting that even Jean-Claude Juncker jokingly referred to Selmayr by the nickname "the Monster." Tomáš Prouza, the Czech State Secretary for European Affairs, stated publicly that "when I need a decision to be taken...I talk to Martin". In October 2017, he was accused in the British media of leaking details relating to Brexit negotiations, though Selmayr denied these accusations.

In December 2023, the Financial Times reported that China's Ministry of State Security had previously targeted Selmayr.

=== Secretary-General ===
Selmayr was appointed Deputy Secretary-General of the European Commission in February 2018. Minutes after this appointment, Juncker informed the European Commissioners that the then secretary-general, Alexander Italianer, intended to retire; they had not been previously notified of this. On 1 March 2018, following the formal retirement of Italianer, Selmayr was approved by the College of Commissioners to replace him as secretary-general. Some media sources claimed that support for Selmayr had been "bought", and with others claiming that Selmayr had "forced" his way into the position. The president of the European Commission Jean-Claude Juncker reportedly threatened to resign if the controversy led to Selmayr's dismissal. On 25 March 2018 the commission issued a formal statement claiming that Selmayr's promotion was in accordance with legal procedures.

The European Ombudsman contested the lightning-quick appointment of Selmayr from deputy secretary-general to secretary-general, found instances of "maladministration" and concluded that the commission "did not follow EU law". The Ombudsman's statement was rejected by the commission.

In the immediate aftermath of his appointment as secretary-general of the European Commission, it was reported that Selmayr had been editing Wikipedia using his own name from an account using a verified ec.europa.eu email address. The commission stated that he did so to correct specific information (including his work positions as well as political and religious affiliations), "in direct interaction with a Wikipedia editor, who checked and verified all information ...and ensured that it is properly referenced".

Selmayr resigned as secretary-general on 1 August 2019, having held the office for less time than any of his predecessors; it was speculated that the decision by the European Council to nominate Ursula von der Leyen as replacement for Juncker as commission president was a factor behind the decision. He was subsequently appointed as the EU's permanent representative to Austria.

== Other activities ==
- GLOBSEC, Member of the International Advisory Council

== Personal life ==
Selmayr is a Protestant. He is married and has lived in Brussels since 2000. He has been a member of the Christian Democratic and Flemish (CD&V) party of Belgium since 2014.

He is the son of the lawyer Gerhard Selmayr; his paternal grandfather was Brigadier General Josef Selmayr, and his maternal grandfather was Lieutenant General Heinrich Gaedcke. Members of the Selmayr family own a castle near Munich.

== Books ==
- The Law of The European Central Bank, Oxford: Hart Publishing (2001), with Chiara Zilioli
- Das Recht der Wirtschafts- und Währungsunion: Die Vergemeinschaftung der Währung, Baden-Baden (2002).
- La Banca centrale europea, Milan (2007), with Chiara Zilioli

Government offices
Preceded by Alexander Italianer	Secretary-General of the European Commission; 2018–2019	Succeeded by Ilze Juhansone
