= Ilze Juhansone =

Latvian diplomat and civil servant

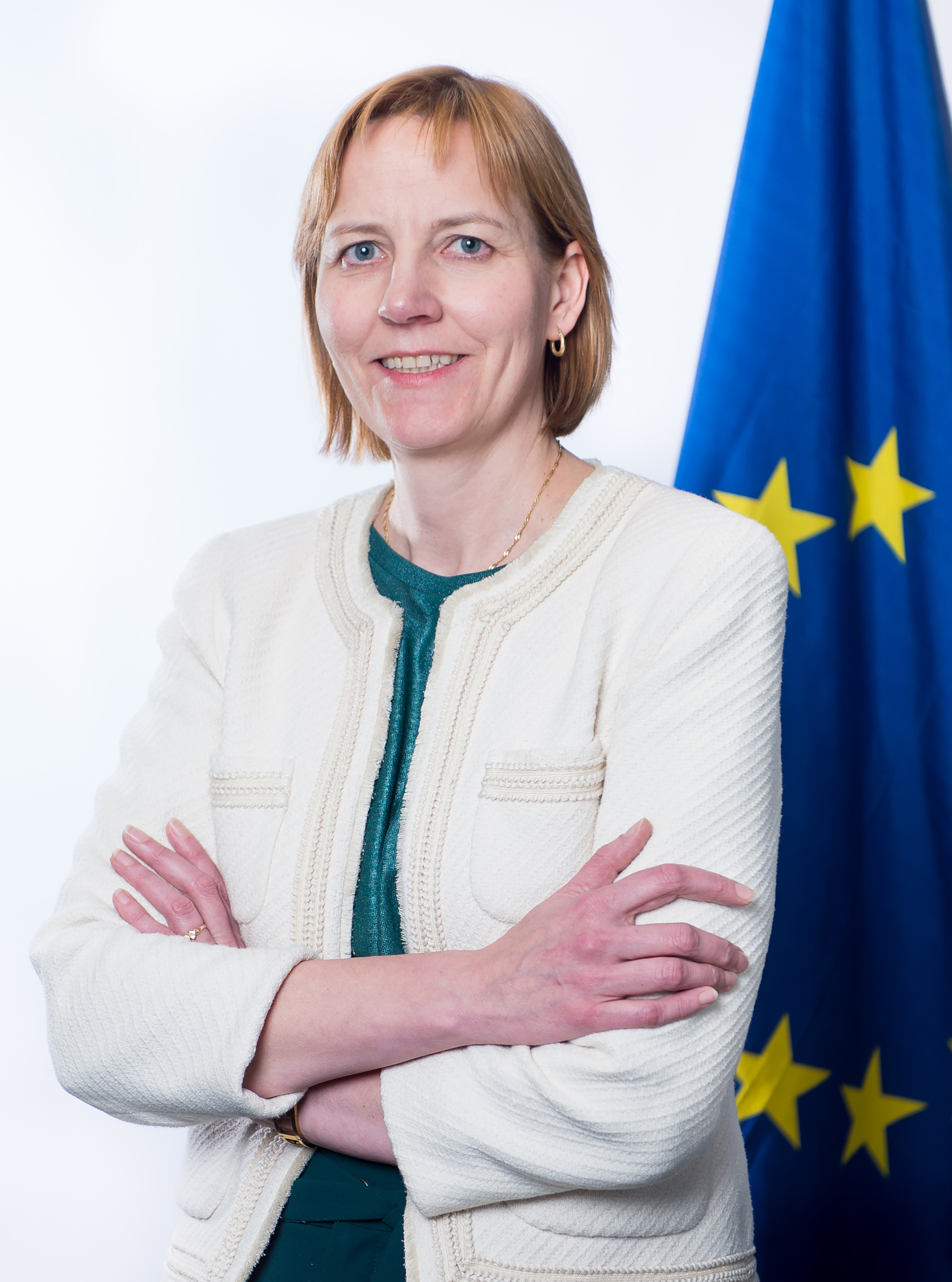

Secretary-General of the European Commission
- Incumbent
- Assumed office 1 August 2019; Acting: 1 August 2019 – 14 January 2020
- President: Jean-Claude Juncker; Ursula von der Leyen
- Preceded by: Martin Selmayr

Ambassador of Latvia to the European Union
- In office 23 February 2011 – 6 December 2015
- Preceded by: Normunds Popens
- Succeeded by: Sanita Pavļuta-Deslandes

Personal details
- Born: 1971 (age 54–55)
- Education: University of Latvia

Ilze Juhansone (born 1971) is the Secretary-General of the European Commission. She is a European civil servant and former Latvian diplomat.

== Career ==
In August 2019, she became the acting Secretary-General pending the search for a full-time successor to Germany's Martin Selmayr. Following the period as acting Secretary-General, she was appointed Secretary-General on 14 January 2020. From October 2015 until 2019, she was Deputy Secretary-General for interinstitutional and external relations, and before that had been Permanent Representative of Latvia to the European Union from 2011 to 2015, including during its Council Presidency in the first half of 2015. This was preceded by having been Director General for EU Affairs at the Latvian Foreign Ministry between 2008 and 2011.

While Permanent Representative of Latvia, she was awarded the Order of the Three Stars, 3rd class.

Government offices
Preceded by Martin Selmayr	Secretary-General of the European Commission; 2019–present Acting: 2019–2020	Incumbent
