= Civil service entrance examination =

Exams to become a public administrator

Civil service examinations are examinations implemented in various countries for recruitment and admission to the civil service. They are intended as a method to achieve an effective, rational public administration on a merit system for recruiting prospective politicians and public sector employees.

The most ancient example of such exams were the imperial examinations of ancient China.

== Competitive exam ==
Competitive examinations are tests where candidates are ranked according to their grades and/or percentile and then top rankers are selected. If the examination is open for n positions, then the first n candidates in ranks pass, the others are rejected. They are used as entrance examinations for university and college admissions such as the Joint Entrance Examination or to secondary schools. Types are civil service examinations, required for positions in the public sector; the U.S. Foreign Service Exam, and the United Nations Competitive Examination. Competitive examinations are considered an egalitarian way to select worthy applicants without risking influence peddling, bias or other concerns. However, implicit biases within society may adversely impact the purported fairness of the exams.

== See also ==
- BCS Examination
- Civil service commission
- EU Concours
- Government procurement
- Invitation to tender
- Merit, excellence, and intelligence (MEI) – framework that emphasizes selecting candidates based solely on their merit, achievements, skills, abilities, intelligence and contributions
- Public utilities commission
- Spoils system
