= European Civil Service Concours =

Selection process for staff of the EU institutions

- Flag of the European Union
- Type: Civil service entrance examination
- Administrator: EPSO
- Skills tested: General knowledge, critical thinking, writing, logical reasoning, etc.
- Purpose: Selection for the European civil service
- Year started: 1951
- Regions: European Union
- Languages: 24 languages
- Annual number of test takers: 174,727 (AD 5)
- Prerequisites: Graduates (AD)
- Used by: EU institutions
- Website: eu-careers.europa.eu

The European Civil Service Concours are the open, competitive and standardised tests in the European Union (EU) conducted on an interinstitutional basis by the European Personnel Selection Office (EPSO) for recruitment to permanent positions in the European civil service, notably at the Commission, either as administrators (AD) or as assistants (AST). It is one of the most competitive civil service entrance examinations in the world, with over 170,000 applicants for the 2026-2027 administrators' concours. Less than one per cent are expected to make it to the final reserve lists from which selections are made.

== History ==
The European civil service was constituted from 1951 onwards with the creation of the European Coal and Steel Community. The introduction of the concours system for recruitment to the European institutions was implemented via the French model, the dominant language being French at the inception of the first community institutions. The administrative concours in France, inspired by the Chinese imperial examinations, were considered a means to combat the corruption of the ancien régime and enact the meritocratic principles of the Republic in the post-revolutionary period.

The competitions were heavily modified under changes led by Neil Kinnock as European Commissioner for Administrative Reform in the Prodi Commission, shifting from a more knowledge-based examination to competence-focused testing.

== Process ==
The European Personnel Selection Office is responsible for the selection of staff for permanent positions. These permanent staff are members of the European civil service appointed for an indefinite period. They form the core workforce and are selected through the concours or open competitions organised by EPSO. These competitions are designed to draw up reserve lists - pools of successful candidates from which the institutions, bodies and agencies of the EU can recruit when they have job openings.

There are two main types of concours: generalist and specialist competitions. Generalist competitions are open to university graduates from any field of study (often lawyers, economists or public administration graduates), with no prior professional experience required; successful candidates are recruited as administrators at grade AD 5 (entry-level grade for this functional group). Specialist competitions are open to graduates and/or non-graduates, designed for candidates with expertise in a specific professional field and relevant work experience in that domain (scientists, technicians, financial officers, doctors, translators, etc.). Successful candidates in these are recruited as administrators of higher grades (AD 6-AD 9) or assistants (grades AST 3-AST 9).

All open competitions are published by notice of competition in the C series of the Official Journal of the European Union. Candidates who have submitted an application are invited to sit a series of tests, depending on the competition. EPSO also undertakes eligibility checks on the candidates to ensure they meet the required criteria. At the end of the competition, EPSO publishes a reserve list of successful candidates who may be recruited if a suitable position becomes available. Presence on a list is time bound and does not automatically lead to employment. Recruitment is managed directly by the EU institutions - or, in the case of the Commission, by the relevant directorate-general or service - and shortlisted candidates are interviewed prior to any formal offer.

== Eligibility ==
In most cases, the general requirements for eligibility are the following:

- Holding citizenship of an EU member state
- Having fulfilled any obligations imposed under national legislation concerning military service
- Meeting the profile requirements for the duties concerned

Candidates must have knowledge of at least two of the twenty-four official EU languages at the level required for the selection procedure. For linguistic profiles, knowledge of at least three languages is usually required.

Requirements for education and professional experience depend on the role and profile. AD roles typically require a university degree and most also require relevant professional experience, with the notable exception of the entry-level AD 5 competition. For AST roles, a secondary education is sufficient with relevant professional experience.

== Tests ==
Placement on the reserve lists requires passing a number of tests and/or written examinations, normally conducted remotely, which usually include some combination of the following in at least two languages (with special additional provisions on language tests for language-specific positions, such as lawyer-linguists or translators).

=== Reasoning tests ===
The reasoning tests are multiple-choice questionnaires designed to evaluate logical thinking skills and ability to understand verbal and numerical information, as well as relationships between abstract concepts that are not linguistic, spatial or numerical in nature.

=== EU knowledge test ===
The EU knowledge test consists of a multiple-choice questionnaire covering the European Union, its institutions, procedures and main policies.

=== Digital skills test ===
The digital skills test is designed to assess candidates' digital literacy and practical knowledge, as relevant to the role. It may cover the following: information and data literacy, communication and collaboration, digital content creation, safety and problem-solving.

=== Written test ===
The essay test is aimed at assessing written communication skills. Candidates have to write their examinations based upon the materials provided. This may generally take three possible forms:

1. Written test - related to the field of the competition; assesses written communication skills only.
2. Field-related written test - assesses both written communication skills and knowledge in the relevant field.
3. Free-text essay on EU matters - assesses written communication skills only.

The written test is often conducted in a candidate's second language.

=== Field-related test ===
The field-related test is a multiple-choice questionnaire aimed at assessing the skills and knowledge relevant to the field of the competition.

=== Language comprehension tests ===
The language comprehension test consists of multiple-choice questions designed to assess linguistic abilities in vocabulary, grammar/syntax and style. Each question presents a scenario with four possible answers of which only one is correct.

=== Translation tests ===
For the evaluation of candidates' language skills, they may be required to pass translation tests which usually entail translation from a candidate's second or third language into their first.

=== Revision test ===
The revision test consists of revising a text that has been translated from a candidate's second language into their first.

== Permanent staff categories ==
There are three categories for permanent EU officials:

=== Administrators (AD) ===
Administrators work in a variety of sectors such as justice, law, finance, environment and climate change, foreign affairs, agriculture, economics, IT, communication, human resources, science, translation and interpretation. Their duties include policy development, analysis, regulatory tasks, international negotiations, stakeholder engagement and drafting and checking EU legal texts.

An administrator career ranges from grades AD 5 to AD 16, with AD 5 being the entry-level grade for university graduates; grades AD 15 and AD 16 are reserved for director-generals. Selection and recruitment are also possible at higher grades AD 6 or AD 7 for specialist profiles. In this case, candidates will be expected to have several years' relevant educational background and work experience will be required for most profiles. Grades AD 9 to AD 12 are required for middle management posts. Previous management experience is mandatory for selection and recruitment at these higher grades.

Successful candidates may be offered the following types of positions, among others: policy officer (most frequently), communication officer, IT administrator, science specialist (including agricultural, health and food safety experts, chemical specialists, nuclear inspectors or artificial intelligence administrators), auditor, external relations officer, statistician, economist, financial manager, lawyer-linguist, lawyer, translator, proofreader, conference interpreter.

=== Assistants (AST) ===
Assistants are typically engaged in an executive or technical role, providing support in a variety of fields such as, inter alia, finance, communication, administration, research, IT or policy implementation. An assistant career ranges from grades AST 1 to AST 11, with staff typically entering at grades AST 1 or AST 3.

=== Secretaries and clerks (AST/SC) ===
These support staff - secretaries and clerks - are generally involved in office management and in providing administrative and technical support. Their duties include finalising documents and files; supporting the unit's or department's activities; compiling and disseminating information (updating databases, files); and potentially performing manual tasks.

== List of services ==
Those who pass the concours may be selected to join the following institutions or bodies:

- European Parliament
- General Secretariat of the Council
- European Commission
- Court of Justice of the European Union
- European Court of Auditors
- European Committee of the Regions
- European Economic and Social Committee
- European Data Protection Supervisor
- European External Action Service
- European Ombudsman

== Preparation ==
A number of public and private bodies prepare and train candidates, some of these are directly or indirectly provided by the permanent representations of EU member states for their own nationals.

== See also ==
- Civil service entrance examination
- European Civil Service
