= Military Counterintelligence Service (Germany) =

Military Counterintelligence Service Militärischer Abschirmdienst (MAD)
- Coat of Arms of the MAD
- Active: since 1956
- Country: Germany
- Branch: Federal Ministry of Defense
- Type: Military intelligence
- Size: ~ 1250 (2021) to be increased to 1800
- Part of: Federal Ministry of Defence
- Headquarters: Cologne

Commanders
- President: Martina Rosenberg

The Military Counterintelligence Service (German: Militärischer Abschirmdienst; MAD) is one of the three federal intelligence agencies in Germany, and is responsible for military counterintelligence within Bundeswehr. The MAD is subordinate to the Federal Ministry of Defense.

The primary tasks of the MAD include securing German troops, camps and facilities against external threats. This is primarily about defensive military intelligence, i.e. the collection of strategic information nationally and at deployments abroad. The MAD is responsible for vetting new members of the armed forces and monitors them for extremism and possible espionage.

The headquarters of the MAD are in Cologne, with twelve offices located in cities throughout Germany. These MAD offices are collectively known to be the Militärischer Abschirmdienst. The agency has about 1,300 military and civilian employees and in 2019 the budget was €113,252,000.

Its formal name is Bundesamt für den Militärischen Abschirmdienst, changed from the former name Amt für die Sicherheit der Bundeswehr.

== Duties ==
As a domestic intelligence service, it has similar functions within the military as the civil Bundesamt für Verfassungsschutz and works closely together with the BfV. The main duties of the MAD are counterintelligence and detection of anticonstitutional activities within the Bundeswehr. Other duties include the protection of Bundeswehr properties from sabotage and foreign espionage. Members of the MAD are also involved in planning and construction of buildings with high security requirements.

MAD is not involved in strategic reconnaissance. For Reconnaissance and SIGINT of enemy forces, Bundeswehr runs Cyber and Information Domain Service (CIR) and the Strategic Reconnaissance Command, KSA. The KSA works closely with the Federal Intelligence Service (BND).

MAD has no prosecution power; prosecution in cases of espionage and betrayal of secrets is executed by the Public Prosecutor General at the Federal Court of Justice, GBA,

The lead agency for the German military intelligence operations as well as strategic defense-related intelligence is the Bundesverteidigungsministerium (Ministry of Defense) in Berlin.

The legal basis for the MAD is the MAD Law of December 20, 1990, as amended by Article 8 of the law of April 22, 2005.

== Organization ==
The organization of MAD: President of MAD, Martina Rosenberger

- leading command
- Vicepresident of MAD (civil), Burkhard Even
  - Departement G: principles/law/intelligence resources
  - Departement E: Countering extremism
  - Departement S: Counterintelligence
  - Departement ES: Self-protection (Eigensicherung)
- Vicepresident MAD (military), Brigadier General Ralf Feldotto
  - Departement Z: General tasks
  - Departement A: deployment shielding (Einsatzabschirmung)
  - Departement P: personnel secret protection and sabotage protection
  - Departement T: technic

MAD has eight regional offices in:

- Kiel
- Hanover
- Hilden (Mettmann)
- Koblenz
- Stuttgart
- Munich
- Schwielowsee (Potsdam-Mittelmark)
- Wilhelmshaven

The former offices in Leipzig, Mainz, and Rostock are defunct.

The training of MAD employees takes place in the military part of the BfV's Academy for the Protection of the Constitution.

== Presidents ==
- Colonel Gerhard Wessel (1956–1957)
- Brigadier General Josef Selmayr (1957–1964)
- Brigadier General Heinrich Seeliger (1964–1967)
- Brigadier General Armin Eck (1967–1972)
- Brigadier General Paul-Albert Scherer (1972–1977)
- Brigadier General Gerd-Helmut Komossa (1977–1980)
- Brigadier General Klaus Vollmer (1980–1982)
- Flotilla Admiral Elmar Schmähling (1982–1983)
- Brigadier General Helmut Behrendt (1983–1984)
- Major General Hubertus Senff (1984–1987)
- Major General Winfried Schwenke (1987–1991)
- Rudolf von Hoegen (1991–2003)
- Richard Alff (2003–2008)
- Major General Georg Freiherr von Brandis (2008–2010)
- Karl-Heinz Brüsselbach (2010–2012)
- Ulrich Birkenheier (2012–2014)
- Christof Gramm (2014–2020)
- Martina Rosenberg (2020–present)

== History ==
The MAD developed out of "liaison" offices between the Allies and the government of the Federal Republic of Germany within the Blank Agency and was founded in its present form in 1956, after the establishment of the Bundeswehr on 12 November 1955. Until 1984 its headquarters was called Amt für Sicherheit der Bundeswehr (ASBw, Federal armed forces office of security).

The MAD has been involved in a number of scandals, including the secret surveillance from 1974 onwards of the home of Hildegard Holz, the secretary of then minister of defence Georg Leber (SPD), without Leber's knowledge. Holz was suspected, incorrectly, of espionage for the East German Ministerium für Staatssicherheit (Ministry of State Security or Stasi). Leber, though informed of the illegal surveillance at the beginning of 1978, did not inform the Bundestag until the magazineQuick published an article on 26 January 1978. Georg Leber resigned from his position on 16 February 1978, against the wishes of chancellor Helmut Schmidt, taking sole responsibility for the surveillance scandal.

=== 1980–2017 ===
Another scandal was the Kießling Affair in 1983, when the MAD investigated Günter Kießling, a Bundeswehr four-star general working in NATO as Commander of NATO land forces and Deputy Supreme Allied Commander Europe. The general was deemed a security risk based on Stasi-leaked allegations of homosexuality, and was given early retirement by the then defence minister Manfred Wörner (CDU). The general was rehabilitated in February 1984. The affair had significant consequences for the service: the commander was removed, and a commission was set up under the former minister of the interior Hermann Höcherl (CSU) which investigated the way in which the MAD operated, and made recommendations for improvement which were implemented speedily.

As of September 1984, on the basis of the Höcherl report, the service was restructured and more civilian positions were established.

After the former East German armed forces, the NVA (the National People's Army), was incorporated into the Bundeswehr in October 1990, the MAD had 7 groups and 28 regional offices. The number of regional offices shrank to 14 in 1994 when there was a reduction of the armed forces.

=== New structure and tasks up from 2017 ===
In 2017, the service was tied more closely to the German Ministry of Defense. Until then, the MAD was subordinate to the inspector of the armed forces base. According to the daily order from Defense Minister Ursula von der Leyen (CDU), MAD should be equal to the Federal Intelligence Service and the Federal Office for the Protection of the Constitution. Since August 1, 2017., MAD has been directly subordinate to the Ministry of Defense as the higher civil federal authority. The impetus for the realignment was the goal of upgrading and professionalizing the service as a federal intelligence service and achieving deeper integration into the federal government's common security architecture. In connection with this, the MAD was given new tasks - for example in connection with strengthening cyber defense.

After several right-wing extremist incidents in the special forces unit KSK, the Federal Ministry of Defense examined the unit more closely, involving also the MAD. In 2020 it became known that an MAD officer had revealed information to up to eight KSK soldiers. He had shown photos of illegal weapons found among KSK members at least to one KSK officer he knew. He warned him that his service might also be interested in him. The MAD lieutenant colonel is suspended and should no longer have access to the secret service's property.

In the annual report 2020 MAD mentioned that the COVID-19 pandemic is being used by intelligence services of foreign countries to influence public opinion in FRG. Representatives of the People's Republic of China tried to "win multipliers for Chinese narratives" with targeted letters to the Ministry of Defense's divisions.

Since the Russian invasion of Ukraine, MAD has to protect the German support of the Ukrainian defence capabilities by Bundeswehr against Russian sabotage. In 2023, with the help of the MAD, an officer from the Bundeswehr procurement authority BAAINBw was arrested on suspicion of being spying for Russia. The BfV observed that the man visited the Russian consulate several times and contacted the MAD. The spy is a sympathizer of the AfD and its Russia policy.

In 2024 Russian state media leaked an intercepted Luftwaffe Communication about the possibility of German Taurus missiles for Ukraine. MAD get the order to investigate where the communication get intercepted.
