= Directorate-General for Energy =

Directorate-General of the European Commission

The Directorate-General for Energy (DG Ener), or ENER, is a Directorate-General of the European Commission, created on 17 February 2010 when it was separated from the Transport DG, with which it had been combined since 2000.

== Mission ==
The Directorate-General for Energy is responsible for promoting and regulating the European Energy Union and, since 2019, overseeing the implementation of the Clean Energy for all Europeans package as part of the European Green New Deal.

== Resources ==
The Directorate-General for Energy, based primarily in Brussels, reports to Dan Jørgensen, European Commissioner for Energy. The former Commissioner for Energy and Climate was Kadri Simson. The current Director-General is Ditte Juul-Jorgensen, former Director-Generals include Dominique Ristori and Phillip Lowe.

== Structure ==
The Directorate-General is made up of 6 Directorates (two of which deal with EURATOM issues), and the Euratom Supply Agency.

== See also ==
- Energy policy of the European Union
- EURATOM
- European Commissioner for Energy
- Green procurement
