= European Civil Service =

Staff serving the institutions and agencies of the European Union

The European Civil Service is a generic term applied to all staff serving the institutions and agencies of the European Union (EU). Although recruitment is sometimes done jointly, each institution is responsible for its own internal structures and hierarchies.

== Principles of public service ==
The rules, principles, standards and working conditions of the European civil service are set out in the Staff Regulations.

In 2012, the European Ombudsman summarised the following five principles of public service which should apply to all staff of the EU institutions:

1. Commitment to the European Union and its citizens
2. Integrity
3. Objectivity
4. Respect for others
5. Transparency

== Staff ==
The European Commission's civil service is headed by a secretary-general, currently Ilze Juhansone holding the position. According to figures published by the commission, 24,428 persons were employed by the commission as officials and temporary agents in their 2016 budget. In addition to these, 9,066 additional staff were employed; these are largely people employed on time-limited contracts (called "contractual agents" in the jargon), staff seconded from national administrations (called "Detached National Experts"), or trainees (called "stagiaires"). The single largest DG is the Directorate-General for Translation, with 2261 staff.

=== Popular terminology ===
European civil servants are sometimes referred to in the anglophone press as "Eurocrats" (a term coined by Richard Mayne, a journalist and personal assistant to the first Commission president, Walter Hallstein). High-ranking officials are sometimes referred to as "European Mandarins".

These terms are sometimes erroneously used by the anglophone press, usually as a derogatory slur, to describe Members of the European Parliament, or European commissioners. MEPs are directly elected representatives, whilst the European Commissioners, despite often being confused as civil servants, are politicians holding public office and accountable to the European Parliament. Much like government ministers at the national level, they instruct the policy direction of the civil service.

=== Nationality ===
As of 1 January 2018 there are staff from all member states, with the largest group being Belgian (15.7% – 5,060 out of 32,196). From the larger member states, 12.1% were Italian, 9.9% French, 7.5% Spanish, 6.7% German, 4.4% Polish and 2.8% British.

Most administration is based in the Belgian capital, Often, those states under-represented in the service tend to have more of their nationals in the higher ranks.

=== Qualifications ===
The qualifications needed to enter the European civil service depend on whether the job is a specialist one and the grade. One of the entry qualifications for the European civil service is that the candidate speak at least two of the official European languages, one of which must be English, French or German. Candidates whose mother tongue is English, French or German must pass the competition for entry in one of the other two official languages.

Prior to their first promotion, officials must demonstrate competence in a third EU official language.

A candidate also needs to have a first degree in any discipline with a diploma issued by a University from any member state of the EU, or, if issued by a University from a non-EU member state it must be homologated by at least one of them in order to be eligible. The services have traditionally hired candidates with degrees in law, Economics, or Audit; competition is tougher for graduates of all other disciplines, although the procedure for the open competitions, known as "Concours", is now under review.

=== Grades ===
Staff are divided into a set of grades: from AD 5, the most junior administrator grade, to AD 16, which is a director-general (AD = administrator). Alongside the AD category is AST (assistant). It is now possible for civil servants to be promoted from AST to AD grade, not previously possible (see below); however in practice the grades remain entrenched. While promotion is in theory according to merit, many management posts are now taken by officials 'parachuted in' from member states. Moreover, staff reforms introduced in 2004 have severely reduced the possibilities for career progression and have created divisions within the service, with pre-2004 entrants enjoying greater pay and privileges. According to the commission's own internal statistics, even though new officials possess an average of eight years work experience, it would take an average of over 40 years to climb from AD 5 to AD 16.

Prior to this new system, introduced in the 2000s (decade), civil servants were traditionally divided into four categories. "A" was policy making (what is now AD), "B' was implementing, "C" was secretarial and "D" was drivers and messengers (B, C and D are now all part of the AST category). There were various grades in each category. The major ranks used to be in the form of A8 (new appointment without prior work experience) to A1 (director-general).

=== Salary and allowances ===
EU civil and other servants work 40 hours a week, though they are theoretically available 24/7. They receive a minimum of 24 days of leave a year (maximum of 30), with additional leave entitlements on grounds of age, grade but no longer distance from home country (this is now a flat-rate 2.5 days for all).

The lowest grades receive between €1,618.83 gross (FG 1 step 1) each month, while the highest grades (AD 15–16 – i.e. Directors General at the end of their career) receives between €14,822.86 and €16,094.79 a month. This salary is taxed by the EU, rather than at the national level. Taxation varies between 8% and 45% depending on individual circumstances. This is paid into the Community budget.

Earnings are augmented by allowances, such as allowances for those living outside their own country, those who are the principal earner in their household, those with children in full-time education, and those who are moving home in order to take up a position or leaving the service. Earnings are also lowered by various additional taxes (i.e. "Special Levy" alias 'crisis levy' introduced in 1973 and increasing regularly every year) and indexes (for EU staff working out-side Brussels).

For a contribution of 2% basic salary, employees are provided with health insurance which covers a maximum of 85% of expenses (100% for serious injury). Employees have the right to a parental leave of six months per person and child during which they obtain an allowance and have (as of January 2014) the possibility of an extension by further 6 months with a smaller allowance.

Salaries were considerably reduced for new entrants from 1 May 2004 onwards as a result of a significant number of reforms effected by Commissioner Neil Kinnock. Staff undertaking the same work may receive very different salaries, depending on their date of recruitment. Careers are also sharply affected, with new staff tending to constitute a 'second division' of workers with limited managerial prospects. As a consequence of these changes, the institutions recruit with difficulty staff from certain countries like UK, Luxembourg, Denmark as wages are the same or lower than in the home country. For example, a Director General's salary is below what a senior executive with similar responsibilities could expect to be earning at the end of their career in the UK and in some countries (like Luxembourg) the lowest wages (FG I – FG II) are even under the legal minimum salary in the respective country, which raise the question about legality of such terms of employment.

In January 2010, The European Commission took the EU member states to court over the Member States' refusal to honour a long-standing formula under which wages for the staff of the European institutions are indexed to the salaries of national civil servants. The formula led to a salary adjustment of 3.7% but the council, representing the member states, was only willing to grant a pay rise of 1.85%. In November 2010, the European Court of Justice ruled that there was no legal basis for the council to set the pay rise to 1.85%. It has been noted that the ECJ judges who would decide in this case would be themselves to benefit from any salary increase agreed. To be noted that the index is published and applied one year and half later, and this delay cause the quarrels like in the 2010 (full crisis) where should be applied the adaptation related to the increases of wages of the national civil servants from 2007 to 2008; while in 2011 the index was already negative (as the national wages has been lowered).

=== Pensions ===
Employees contribute about 11.3% of their basic salary to a pension scheme. This scheme does not constitute a separate, ring-fenced pension fund; rather, pension payments are made from the general administrative budget of the commission.

Pensions are paid as a percentage of the final basic salary, with the percentage increasing by an annual accrual rate (a fixed percentage per year of service) up to a ceiling of 70%. Early retirement is possible as of 58 years, albeit with the pension being reduced by a fixed pension reduction coefficient per year before the pensionable age. For staff who entered service 2014 or later, the annual accrual rate is 1.8%, the pensionable age is 66 years, early retirement is possible as of 58 years with a pension reduction coefficient of 3.5%.

Different conditions apply to those hired before 2014: Those who entered service between 1 May 2004 and 31 December 2013 have an annual accrual rate of 1.9%, a pensionable age between 63 and 65 years, the same early retirement age limit of 58 years and a lower pension reduction coefficient of 1.75% for years above the age of 60. Those in place before 1 May 2004 have an annual accrual rate of 2.0%, a pensionable age between 60 and 65 years, the same early retirement age limit of 58 years and a lower pension reduction coefficient of 1.75% for years above the age of 60.

Before 1 January 2014, other conditions had applied: For those who entered service on 1 May 2004 or later, the pensionable age had been 63 years, and for those who entered service before 1 May 2004 it had been between 60 and 63 years. Early retirement had been possible as of 55 years for all staff, with a pension reduction coefficient of 3.5% per year before the pensionable age, except that a small percentage of officials could retire early without that pension reduction if it was in the interest of the service. To mitigate the changes implemented as of 2014, transitional pension rules were put in place for staff in place on 1 January 2014, which included setting the pensionable age for staff between 55 and 60 years of age on 1 January 2014 to lie between 60 and 61 years. Transition measures applied also to early retirement: Staff already aged 54 years or older on 1 January 2014 could still retire, albeit with application of the pension reduction coefficient, in 2014 or 2015 at the age of 56 years or in 2016 at the age of 57 years.

Before 1 May 2004, the pensionable age had been 60 years. When this age was raised in 2004, this was accompanied by transition measures so that it remained unchangedly at 60 for officials aged 50 or more as well as for officials who had already completed 20 years of service or more on 1 May 2004, and it varied from 60 years and 2 months to 62 years and 8 months for officials who were aged 30 to 49 on 1 May 2004.

=== Recruitment ===
Recruitment is on the basis of competitions organised centrally by EPSO (European Personnel Selection Office) on the basis of qualifications and of the need for staff.

== Organisational culture ==
During the 1980s, the commission was primarily dominated by French, German and Italian cultural influences, including a strictly hierarchical organisation. Commissioners and Directors-General were referred to by their title (in French) with greater prestige for those of higher ranks. As one former servant, Derk Jan Eppink has put it, even after new staff had passed the tough entrance exams: "Those at the top counted for everything. Those at the bottom counted for nothing." One example of this was the chef de cabinet of President Jacques Delors, Pascal Lamy, who was particularly notable for his immense influence over other civil servants. He became known as the Beast of the Berlaymont, the Gendarme and the Exocet due to his habit of ordering civil servants, even Directors-General (head of departments) "precisely what to do – or else." He was seen as ruling Delors's office with a "rod of iron", with no-one able to bypass or manipulate him and those who tried being "banished to one of the less pleasant European postings".

However, since the enlargement of the EU, and therefore the arrival of staff from the many newer Member States, there has been a change in the culture of the civil service. New civil servants from northern and eastern states brought in new influences while the commission's focus has shifted more to "participation" and "consultation". A more egalitarian culture took over, with Commissioners no longer having a "status equivalent to a sun God" and, with this new populism, the first women were appointed to the Commission in the 1990s and the service gained its first female secretary general in 2006 (Catherine Day). In stark contrast to the 1980s, it is not uncommon to see men without ties and children playing football in the corridors.

=== Criticisms ===
It has been alleged that, for want of a common administrative culture, European Civil Servants are held together by a "common mission" which gives DGs a particularly enthusiastic attitude to the production of draft legislation regardless of the intentions of the Commissioner. They are also notably bound by their common procedures, in the absence of a common administrative culture, which are best known by the Secretariat-General, thus considered a prestigious office, just below the President's cabinet.

There has been some criticism that the highly fragmented DG structure wastes a considerable amount of time in turf wars as the different departments and Commissioners compete with each other, as is the case in national administrations. Furthermore, the DGs can exercise considerable control over a Commissioner unless the Commissioner learns to assert control over his/her staff. The DGs work closely with the Commissioner's cabinet. While the DG has responsibility for preparation of work and documents, the cabinet has responsibility for giving the Commissioner political guidance. However, in practice both seek a share of each other's work. It has been alleged that some DGs try to influence decision making by providing Commissioners with briefing documents as late and large as possible, ensuring that the Commissioner has no time to do anything but accept the version of facts presented by the DG. In doing this the DG is competing with the cabinet, which acts as a "bodyguard" for the Commissioner.

== Organisational structure ==
The commission is divided into departments known as Directorates-General (DGs or the services), each headed by a director-general, and various other services. Each covers a specific policy area or service such as External Relations or Translation and is under the responsibility of a European Commissioner. DGs prepare proposals for their Commissioners which can then be put forward for voting in the college of Commissioners.

Whilst the commission's DGs cover similar policy areas to the ministries in national governments, European Civil Servants have not necessarily been trained, or worked, in a national civil service before employment in the EU. On entry, they do not therefore share a common administrative culture.

=== List of Directorates-General ===
The Directorates-General are divided into four groups: Policy DGs, External relations DGs, General Service DGs and Internal Service DGs. Internally, the DGs are referred to by their abbreviations; provided below.

Departments (DGs)
DG	Abbreviation	Relevant Commissioner
Agriculture and Rural Development	AGRI	European Commissioner for Agriculture
Budget	BUDG	European Commissioner for Budget and Administration
Climate Action	CLIMA	European Commissioner for Climate Action
Communications Networks, Content and Technology	CONNECT	European Commissioner for Digital Agenda
Communication	COMM	President of the European Commission
Competition	COMP	European Commissioner for Competition
Defence Industry and Space	DEFIS	European Commissioner for Internal Market
Economic and Financial Affairs	ECFIN	European Commissioner for Economy
Education and Culture	EAC	European Commissioner for Innovation, Research, Culture, Education and Youth
Employment, Social Affairs and Inclusion	EMPL	European Commissioner for Jobs and Social Rights
Energy	ENER	European Commissioner for Energy
European Neighbourhood Policy and Enlargement Negotiations	NEAR	European Commissioner for Neighbourhood and Enlargement
Internal Market, Industry, Entrepreneurship and SMEs	GROW	European Commissioner for Internal Market
Environment	ENV	European Commissioner for Environment, Oceans and Fisheries
International Partnerships	INTPA	European Commissioner for International Partnerships
Eurostat	ESTAT	European Commissioner for Economy
Financial Stability, Financial Services and Capital Markets Union	FISMA	European Commissioner for Financial Stability, Financial Services and Capital Markets Union
Health and Food Safety	SANTE	European Commissioner for Health and Food Safety
Migration and Home Affairs	HOME	European Commissioner for Home Affairs
Civil Protection and Humanitarian Aid	ECHO	European Commissioner for Crisis Management
Human Resources and Security	HR	European Commissioner for Budget and Administration
Digital Services	DIGIT	European Commissioner for Budget and Administration
Interpretation	SCIC	European Commissioner for Budget and Administration
Joint Research Centre	JRC	European Commissioner for Innovation, Research, Culture, Education and Youth
Justice and Consumers	JUST	European Commissioner for Justice
Maritime Affairs and Fisheries	MARE	European Commissioner for Environment, Oceans and Fisheries
Mobility and Transport	MOVE	European Commissioner for Transport
Regional and Urban Policy	REGIO	European Commissioner for Cohesion and Reforms
Research and Innovation	RTD	European Commissioner for Innovation, Research, Culture, Education and Youth
Secretariat General	SG	President of the European Commission
Structural Reform Support	REFORM	European Commissioner for Cohesion and Reforms
Taxation and Customs Union	TAXUD	European Commissioner for Economy
Trade	TRADE	European Commissioner for Trade
Translation	DGT	European Commissioner for Budget and Administration

=== List of Services ===
Services
Service	Abbreviation
European Commission Library	EC Library
Inspire, Debate, Engage and Accelerate Action	IDEA
European Anti-Fraud Office	OLAF
European Commission Data Protection Officer	DPO
Health Emergency Preparedness and Response Authority	HERA
Historical Archives of the European Union	HAEU
Infrastructures and Logistics – Brussels	OIB
Infrastructures and Logistics – Luxembourg	OIL
Internal Audit Service	IAS
Legal Service	SJ
Office for Administration and Payment of Individual Entitlements	PMO
Publications Office	OP
Recovery and Resilience Task Force	RECOVER
European Personnel Selection Office	EPSO
European School of Administration	EUSA
Service for Foreign Policy Instruments	FPI

=== List of Executive Agencies ===
Executive Agencies
Executive Agency	Abbreviation
European Climate, Infrastructure and Environment Executive Agency	CINEA
European Education and Culture Executive Agency	EACEA
European Health and Digital Executive Agency	HADEA
European Innovation Council and Small and Medium-sized Enterprises Executive Agency	EISMEA
European Research Council Executive Agency	ERCEA
European Research Executive Agency	REA

=== List of Secretariat-General bodies ===
Secretariat-General bodies
Body	Abbreviation
Regulatory Scrutiny Board	RSB

=== Staff trade unions ===
The European Civil servants working for the European Civil Service can vote for representatives amongst several trade unions which then sit in representatives instances of the institution, for example:

- Union Syndicale
- European Civil Service Federation (FFPE)
- Union 4 Unity
- Renouveau et Démocratie

== See also ==
- College of Europe
- European Union Civil Service Tribunal
- EU Concours
