= Directorate-General for Financial Stability, Financial Services and Capital Markets Union =

The Directorate-General for Financial Stability, Financial Services and Capital Markets Union (DG FISMA) is a Directorate-General (DG) of the European Commission. It is one of the thirty three DGs created and named to reflect their functions.

The main responsibilities of the Directorate-General FISMA include initiating and implementing EU policy in the areas of banking and finance, including the Capital Markets Union, and corporate reporting and auditing.

After the 2008 financial crisis, the EU responded with a series of reforms to ensure financial market stability and to enhance the supervision of financial markets.

The operational role of DG FISMA is to ensure that EU legislation is fully implemented, to monitor the effectiveness of these reforms and to respond to any further financial risks that may become apparent.

== Organisation ==
According to its latest organogram, the DG FISMA is organized into five directorates:

- FISMA A - General affairs
- FISMA B - Horizontal policies
- FISMA C - Financial markets
- FISMA D - Banking, insurance and financial crime
- FISMA E - Financial stability, sanctions and enforcement

In the current legislature period (2019-2024) DG FISMA focuses on the achievement of one of the six top European Commission's political priorities, namely "An economy that works for people".

== Personnel ==
Mairead McGuinness has been the EU Commissioner for this area since 2020; John Berrigan is the Director-General and he manages DG FISMA. David O'Sullivan, the EU's Sanctions Envoy, is based within this DG.

In 2020 the DG had 349 employees.

== See also ==
- European Commissioner for Financial Stability, Financial Services and the Capital Markets Union
- Capital Markets Union
- European Coal and Steel Community (EGKS)
- Treaty of Rome
- Single European Act
- World Trade Organization (WTO)
