= Secretary-General of the European Commission =

Civil servant of the European Commission

- Emblem of the commission

- Flag of Europe

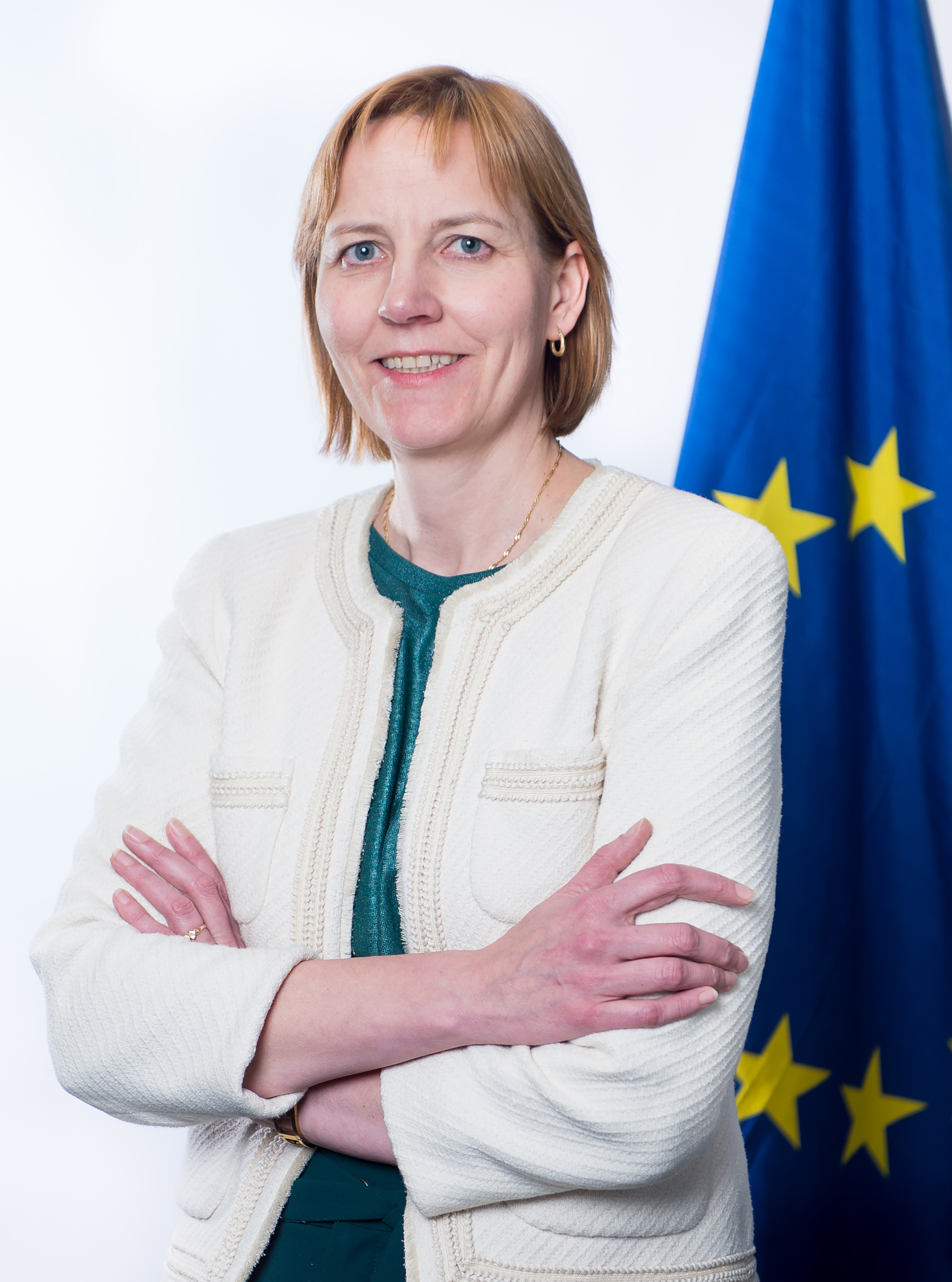
- Incumbent; Ilze Juhansone since 1 August 2019
- Secretariat-General of the European Commission
- Style: Secretary-General
- Status: Chief executive
- Reports to: President of the European Commission
- Seat: Brussels, Belgium
- Term length: No fixed term
- Constituting instrument: Treaties of the European Union
- Formation: 1967
- First holder: Émile Noël
- Deputy: Deputy Secretary-General
- Website: ec.europa.eu

The secretary-general of the European Commission is the senior civil servant of the European Commission. The secretary-general, who is responsible to the president of the European Commission, is in charge of the various Directorates-General, headed by directors-general.

Their staff form the Secretariat-General of the European Commission.

== List of secretaries-general of the European Commission ==
N.	Secretary-General	Member State	Beginning	End	Commission
1	Émile Noël	France	26 March 1958	18 September 1987	Hallstein I
1	Émile Noël	France	26 March 1958	18 September 1987	Hallstein II
1	Émile Noël	France	26 March 1958	18 September 1987	Rey Commission
1	Émile Noël	France	26 March 1958	18 September 1987	Malfatti Commission
1	Émile Noël	France	26 March 1958	18 September 1987	Mansholt Commission
1	Émile Noël	France	26 March 1958	18 September 1987	Ortoli Commission
1	Émile Noël	France	26 March 1958	18 September 1987	Jenkins Commission
1	Émile Noël	France	26 March 1958	18 September 1987	Thorn Commission
1	Émile Noël	France	26 March 1958	18 September 1987	Delors I
2	David Williamson	United Kingdom	19 September 1987	31 July 1997	Delors I
2	David Williamson	United Kingdom	19 September 1987	31 July 1997	Delors II
2	David Williamson	United Kingdom	19 September 1987	31 July 1997	Delors III
2	David Williamson	United Kingdom	19 September 1987	31 July 1997	Santer Commission
3	Carlo Trojan	Netherlands	1 August 1997	31 May 2000	Santer Commission
3	Carlo Trojan	Netherlands	1 August 1997	31 May 2000	Prodi Commission
4	David O'Sullivan	Ireland	1 June 2000	10 November 2005	Prodi Commission
4	David O'Sullivan	Ireland	1 June 2000	10 November 2005	Barroso I
5	Catherine Day	Ireland	11 November 2005	1 September 2015	Barroso I
5	Catherine Day	Ireland	11 November 2005	1 September 2015	Barroso II
5	Catherine Day	Ireland	11 November 2005	1 September 2015	Juncker Commission
6	Alexander Italianer	Netherlands	1 September 2015	1 March 2018	Juncker Commission
7	Martin Selmayr	Germany	1 March 2018	30 November 2019	Juncker Commission
8	Ilze Juhansone	Latvia	24 July 2019	Ongoing	Juncker Commission
8	Ilze Juhansone	Latvia	24 July 2019	Ongoing	Von der Leyen Commission I
8	Ilze Juhansone	Latvia	24 July 2019	Ongoing	Von der Leyen Commission II

== See also ==
- European Civil Service
