= Genoveva Ruiz Calavera =

European civil servant

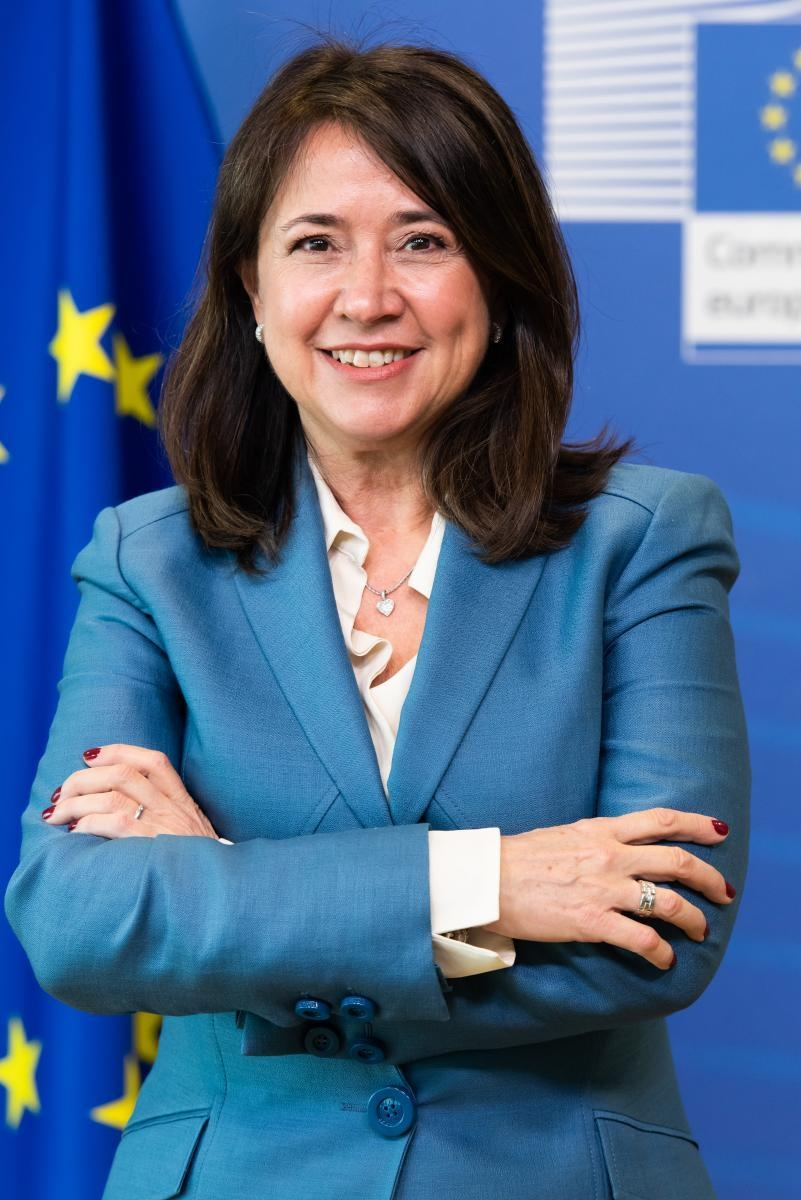
- Official portrait, 2021

Director-General for Interpretation
- Incumbent
- Assumed office 1 April 2021
- Commission: Von der Leyen I and II
- Preceded by: Florika Fink-Hooijer
Previous positions
2016–2021	Director for Western Balkans (DG NEAR)

Personal details
- Born: 1962 (age 63–64) Madrid, Spain
- Citizenship: Spain
- Education: Complutense University of Madrid; Solvay Business School
- Profession: European civil servant

Genoveva "Veva" Ruiz Calavera is a European civil servant of Spanish nationality who have served as Director-General at the Directorate-General for Interpretation (SCIC) of the European Commission since April 2021.

== Education ==
Genoveva Ruiz Calavera completed her final year of schooling in the United States at Marlborough School in Los Angeles. From 1982 to 1987, she attended the Complutense University of Madrid, graduating with a degree in English philology. In 1994, she graduated with a Master's in Public Management from Solvay Brussels School of Economics and Management.

== Career ==
Genoveva Ruiz Calavera worked in the private sector for a few years before joining the European Commission in 1992. From 1992 to 1999, Ruiz Calavera worked for DG TAXUD on negotiations for accession of Sweden, Finland and Austria in 1996; and the accession of the Baltic and Eastern European countries, Malta and Cyprus (which later became EU member states in 2004).

In 1999, she joined the Task Force for the Reconstruction of Kosovo (TAFKO), working from Pristina, and returning to Brussels the following year as a deputy head of unit at DG RELEX in charge of relations with the Federal Republic of Yugoslavia (Serbia and Montenegro). In 2006, she became responsible for issues relating to Kosovo and, in 2009, Head of Crisis Response and Peace Building. Ruiz Calavera left DG RELEX for FPI in 2011. In 2016, she was appointed Director for Western Balkans at DG NEAR. In this capacity, she was responsible for managing bilateral relations between the candidate countries of the region and guiding their accession negotiations as required by the European Council. In this role, and in her subsequent position as Director-General, Ruiz Calavera has played a strong role in representing the EU externally in bilateral and multilateral formats.

At SCIC, Ruiz Calavera is responsible for the modernisation of the service in the face of the digital transformation and the integration of new technologies for the purposes of interpretation.

In 2022, Ruiz Calavera was named as one of the 500 most influential Spanish women.
