= Colin Scicluna =

European civil servant

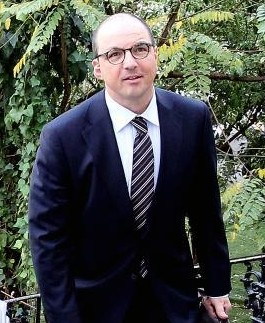
- Scicluna in Lebanon in 2015

Deputy Director-General at SCIC
- Incumbent
- Assumed office 15 November 2024
- Commission: Von der Leyen II

Head of Cabinet to Vice-President Šuica
- In office December 2019 – November 2024
- Commission: Von der Leyen I
Other Commission roles
2017–2019	Director for Middle East, North Africa & Gulf (EEAS)
2014–2016	Member, Cabinet of Commissioner Hahn
2013–2014	Member, Cabinet of HR/VP Ashton
2011–2012	Political Advisor to the EUSR for the MEPP (EEAS)
2006–2010	Mediterranean & Middle East Advisor to HR/SG Solana (GSC)

Maltese Ambassador to Austria, Hungary, Slovakia, Kosovo, the OSCE & the UN in Vienna
- In office February 2012 – August 2013
- President: George Abela
- Prime Minister: Lawrence Gonzi
Other Government roles
2004–2006	Deputy Permanent Representative of Malta to the UN in New York
2003–2004	Senior Legal Officer, Foreign Ministry
2000–2003	EU Accession Negotiations Coordinator, Prime Minister's Office
1999-2000	Counsellor, Mission of Malta to the EU
1994-1998	First Secretary, Mission of Malta to the EU and Embassy of Malta to Belgium

Personal details
- Born: 5 February 1967 (age 59) Malta
- Citizenship: Malta
- Spouse: Annelies Traas
- Children: 2
- Education: University of Malta; Université libre de Bruxelles
- Profession: Diplomat; European civil servant

Colin Scicluna (born 5 February 1967) is a European civil servant and diplomat of Maltese nationality who is currently serving as Deputy Director-General of the European Commission's language interpretation service, SCIC. Prior to that, he was Head of Cabinet to Vice-president Dubravka Šuica for Democracy and Demography in the Von der Leyen I Commission. He is a diplomat by profession and has served both the Government of Malta and the European institutions.

== Education ==
Colin Scicluna holds a notarial diploma from the University of Malta's Faculty of Laws. He would later obtain his doctorate of laws from the university in 1993. As a student in Malta in the 1980s, Scicluna stated his dream was for his country to join the European Union and he wished to work to advance that endeavour. During the 1998–1999 academic year, Scicluna completed a master's degree in International Politics from the Centre d'études des relations internationales et stratégiques of the Université libre de Bruxelles.

He is a former fellow of the peacemaking and conflict prevention programme run by the United Nations Institute for Training and Research in Oslo.

== Career ==
=== Maltese diplomacy ===
After a year as a shipping clerk for Cassar & Cooper, Colin Scicluna turned towards public service. In 1993–1994, he was a trainee at the Maltese mission to the EU and the Kingdom of Belgium, becoming First Secretary in later 1994 and later being promoted to the rank of Counsellor. At various moments, Scicluna had been posted abroad to act as liaison with states holding the rotating Council presidency, namely to Ireland in 1996 and Finland in 1999. In 2000, Scicluna returned to Malta to serve as a negotiations coordinator within the EU Accession Negotiations Secretariat within the Office of the Prime Minister. He served in that role until 2003, whereupon he was reintegrated the Maltese foreign ministry as a legal officer, before being posted to New York as Deputy Permanent Representative of Malta to the UN.

From 2012 to 2013, Scicluna served as the Maltese Ambassador in Vienna, accredited to Austria, Hungary, Slovakia, Kosovo, the OSCE and the UN bodies in the city.

=== European civil service ===
In 2006, Colin Scicluna became advisor to Javier Solana, the first High Representative of the Union for Foreign Affairs and Security Policy, on the Mediterranean and Middle East, at the General Secretariat of the Council. In 2011, he moved to the EEAS, becoming political advisor to the EU Special Representative for the Middle East Peace Process. He returned to work in the High Representative's cabinet under Catherine Ashton, the first High Representative to be ex officio Vice-president of the European Commission, from 2013 to 2014. During the first two years of the Juncker Commission, Scicluna was a member of cabinet for Commissioner Johannes Hahn, responsible for the European Neighbourhood Policy and enlargement negotiations.

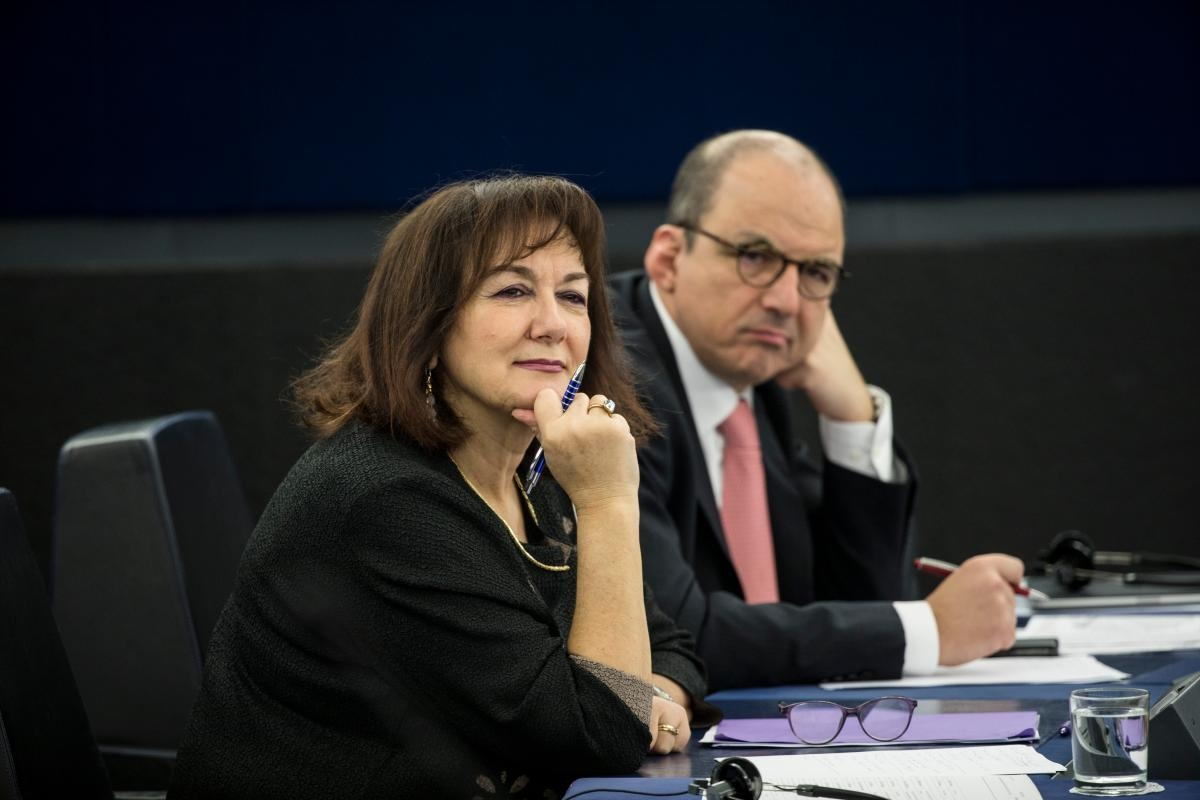
Scicluna, right, as head of cabinet to Vice-president Šuica, left, in the European Parliament in 2020

On 1 January 2017, he was appointed Deputy Managing Director for Middle East, North Africa & Gulf at the EEAS by High Representative Federica Mogherini, a position he held until his appointment as Head of Cabinet to Vice-president Šuica during the first von der Leyen Commission. In this capacity, he brought much of the Mediterranean and Middle East portfolio which would later shape Šuica's role in the Von der Leyen II Commission. Scicluna had already focused on bringing a Mediterranean outlook as the accredited Maltese head of mission to the OSCE and pursued this within the EU, considering that European security has long been focused on an east–west axis to the detriment of the north–south one. He has also played a key role in developing citizen-led deliberative democracy within EU settings and addressing demographic chances by identifying necessary support measures, adapted to different regions of the continent.

In 2024, he became Deputy Director-General at the Directorate-General for Interpretation. He has highlighted the importance of multilingualism in European citizenship and democracy.

Scicluna speaks Maltese, English, Italian, French and Dutch.
