= General Services in the European Commission =

The term General Service refers to a collection of Directorates-General and Services within the European Commission that provide services to the policy-making DGs. They are not policy-making themselves.

== Structure ==
- European Anti-Fraud Office (OLAF)
- Eurostat
- Communication
- Publications Office
- Secretariat General
