= EU Cities Adapt =

EU Cities Adapt or Adaptation Strategies for European Cities is a project commissioned by the European Commission's Directorate-General for Climate Action DG CLIMA. The aim of the project is to provide capacity building and assistance for cities across Europe in developing and implementing a climate change adaptation strategy by raising awareness throughout Europe on the importance of preparing for climate change in cities, exchanging knowledge and good practices, and developing tools and guidance for cities on adaptation. It ultimately aims to mainstream urban climate adaptation throughout Europe.

The EU Cities Adapt project is the beginning of DG CLIMA's engagement and support for European cities on urban climate adaptation. It will provide input into the EU strategy on adaptation to climate change that the Commission is currently developing. Twenty-one cities will be immediately involved in the project as pilots to set an example for other cities.

EU Cities Adapt was launched together with the European Climate Adaptation Platform (Climate-ADAPT) on 23 March 2012 at the European Environment Agency in Copenhagen.

== The project team ==
The project has been placed with a consortium led by AEA Technology and ICLEI Europe. It also includes the University of Manchester, Adelphi, Arcadis and Alexander Ballard Ltd.

The project is backed by the United Nations Office for Disaster Risk Reduction.
