= European Business and Innovation Centre =

European Business and Innovation Centres (commonly known as EU|BICs or simply BICs), formerly known as EC-BIC (European Community Business and Innovation Centres), are quality-certified innovation-based business incubators according to standards set by the European Commission.

The accreditation is awarded to organizations for the quality and impact of their practices in the selection, training, and support given to potential entrepreneurs and SMEs to innovate and prosper. The label is managed by the European Business and Innovation Centre Network (EBN), an international not for profit association in Brussels set by the commission to provide networking, training, promotion and information to EU|BICs.

== History ==
Set up in 1984, EU|BICs were a project initiated by the European Commission, DG Regional and Urban Policy. As an instrument for regional policy and cohesion, BICs had the mission of diversifying the output and strengthening the latent economic potential of regions going through deindustrialisation.

The European Commission co-financed the creation of BICs in industrial regions together with various local bodies (often with regional government and development agencies, sometimes in association with universities, research centres, financial institutions and private sector organizations), to provide support services to potential entrepreneurs wanting to innovate in the region. EU|BICs needed to be locally based, publicly privately owned, and become self-financing organizations.

In 2004, EU|BICs became a quality-based certification scheme to be granted to existing organisations who applied and qualified, replacing the former system of co-financing the foundation of organisations. In 2014, EBN became the sole owner and manager of the EU|BIC label.

== See also ==
- Business incubator
- Science park
- Regional policy of the European Union
