= Directorate-General for Regional Policy and Cohesion =

Portfolios of the European Commission of the European Union now refer to either of:

- Directorate-General for Regional and Urban Policy
- European Commissioner for Cohesion and Reforms
