= Florika Fink-Hooijer =

German civil servant

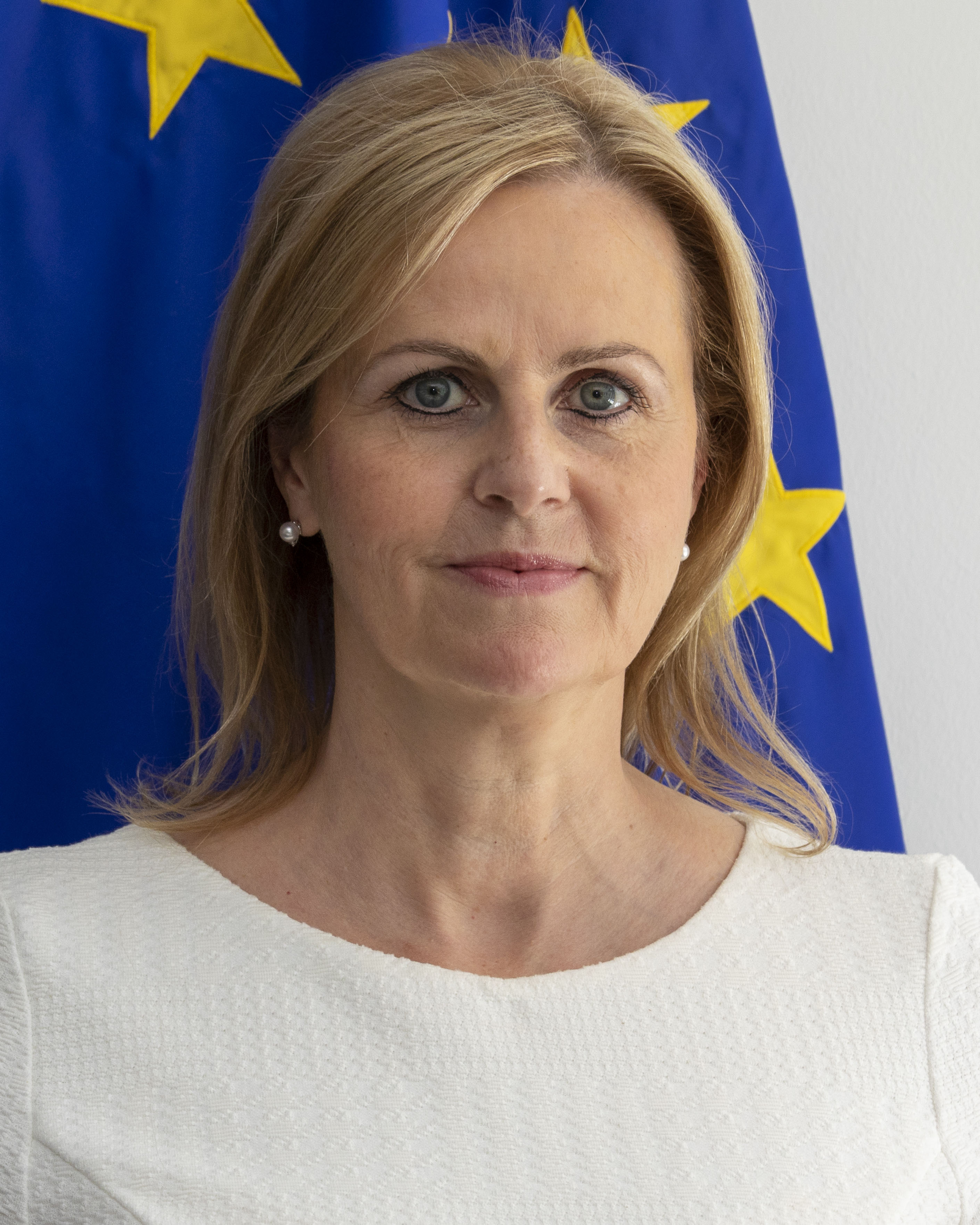

Director General Health Emergency Preparedness and Response Authority (DG HERA) European Commission
- Incumbent
- Assumed office 01. April 2025
- President: Ursula von der Leyen
- Preceded by: Pierre Delsaux

Director General Directorate-General for Environment European Commission
- In office 2020-2025
- President: Ursula von der Leyen
- Preceded by: Daniel Calleja Crespo

Personal details
- Born: 16 March 1962 (age 64) Darmstadt, West Germany
- Spouse: Johannes Jeroen Hooijer
- Children: 3
- Education: Free University of Berlin; University of Bonn; University of Lausanne; Vrije Universiteit Brussel

Florika Fink-Hooijer (born 1962) is a senior EU official at the European Commission. She is director-general of the Health Emergency Preparedness and Response Authority (DG HERA).

Florika Fink-Hooijer joined the European Commission in 1990 and has held various high level and senior management posts in the area of external (bilateral) policy as well as foreign and security policy, humanitarian aid, disaster risk reduction and environmental protection.

== Early life and education ==
Fink-Hooijer was born in Darmstadt, West Germany, and raised in West Berlin. She is the second of three children born to Dr. Bertold Fink, a supreme court judge at the Federal Administrative Court of West Germany (Bundesverwaltungsgericht), and Margret Fink (originally Witte), a senior business teacher (Gewerbeoberstudienrätin).

Fink-Hooijer pursued her legal studies at the Rheinische Friedrich-Wilhelms-Universität Bonn and at the Université de Lausanne. She went on to complete a Master of Laws (LL.M.) in International and Comparative Law from the Vrije Universiteit Brussel.

Subsequently, she obtained a Ph.D. in copyright law from the Free University of Berlin, with a dissertation focusing on the subject of immediate termination in copyright contract law.

Prior to joining the European Commission, she worked at the law firms of Nordemann, Vinck & Hertin in Berlin, and De Brauw Blackstone Westbroek in The Hague.

== European career ==
Fink-Hooijer began her career as a European civil servant in the European Commission in 1990. Her initial roles included positions as an administrator in the Internal Market and External Policies departments, as well as in the Secretariat-General, where she contributed extensively to EU policy documentation.

=== Cabinet of Commissioner Monika Wulf-Mathies, 1995-1998 ===
In 1995, Fink-Hooijer joined the Cabinet of Monika Wulf-Mathies, the Commissioner responsible for EU Regional Policy. In this role, she was instrumental in developing the pre-accession instruments as part of the Agenda 2000 initiative and handled broader legal and institutional affairs.

=== Cabinet of Commissioner Frits Bolkestein, 1999-2000 ===
From 1999, Fink-Hooijer served in the Cabinet of Commissioner Frits Bolkestein, who was responsible for the Internal Market and Financial Services. She played a key role in shaping the European Patent Convention and introduced significant policy advancements in copyright, e-commerce and data protection for the digital age.

=== Various Tenures as Head of Unit, 2000-2010 ===
Between 2000 and 2010, Fink-Hooijer held various middle management positions, first in the Directorate-General for External Relations (RELEX) (the predecessor of the European External Action Service), and later in the Secretariat-General.

During this period, she was instrumental in the establishment of the EU's first civilian crisis management missions, including police, monitoring, training, and protection operations. Additionally, she played a central role in the creation of early EU military structures and contributed to the development of the European Security and Defence Policy (ESDP), followed by the Common Foreign and Security Policy (CFSP). As the EU's chief negotiator for the Kimberly Process Certification Scheme on conflict diamonds, she led the implementation of this pioneering crisis management tool across the EU and globally.

Later, Fink-Hooijer managed bilateral relations with Northeast and Southeast Asia and was pivotal in shaping the Monitoring and Certification Mechanism for Bulgaria and Romania, which later evolved into the European Rule of Law Mechanism applicable to all EU Member States.

=== Head of the Cabinet of Vice-President Kristalina Georgieva, 2010-2012 ===
In 2010, Fink-Hooijer became Head of Cabinet for Vice-President Kristalina Georgieva during her tenure as the first Commissioner for International Cooperation, Humanitarian Aid and Crisis Response. In this capacity, she spearheaded the creation of the European Emergency Response Coordination Centre, which coordinates the delivery of humanitarian aid and civil protection assistance in crisis-, conflict- or disaster-stricken regions, both within and outside the EU, including at the request of the United Nations. She also played a significant role in strengthening the EU Civil Protection Mechanisms, enhancing their coordination with humanitarian aid in crisis situations.

=== Directorate-General for European Civil Protection and Humanitarian Aid Operations (DG ECHO), 2012-2016 ===
By 2012, Fink-Hooijer had become the first Policy Director in the Directorate-General for European Civil Protection and Humanitarian Aid Operations, where she managed responses to such crisis as the Ebola outbreak (2013-2016) and maritime incidents (Maritime Incident Response Group). She substantially advanced the EU's role in humanitarian aid and disaster risk reduction by introducing cash-based aid systems (as opposed to traditional in-kind aid delivery), promoting gender- and age-sensitive aid approaches, and advocating for international humanitarian law. She also established a multifaceted early warning system, created the EU's first Disaster Knowledge Centre, and helped set up the European Voluntary Humanitarian Aid Corps to build local capacity and resilience in disaster-affected communities. Additionally, as a Policy Director for Humanitarian Aid, she pioneered civil-military cooperation with the European External Action Service (EEAS) to enhance the protection of civilians in emergencies.

=== Director-General of the Directorate-General for Interpretation (SCIC), 2016-2020 ===
In 2016, Fink-Hooijer was appointed Director-General of DG Interpretation, the largest interpreting service in the world and the only Directorate-General operating on an entrepreneurial model, functioning as a fee-based service provider for various EU institutions and agencies, and comprising both statutory and freelance staff. Under her leadership, the first-ever Knowledge Centre on Interpretation (KCI) was established and she emphasized the need to "future-proof" interpretation services through the integration of new technologies and Artificial Intelligence. Subsequently, she drove forward the digitalization of the service by introducing features like automatic speech recognition and other support services to interpreters. During the COVID-19 pandemic, Fink-Hooijer swiftly scaled up multilingual interpretation for hybrid meetings via digital platforms, a "watershed moment" that ensured the continued relevance of interpretation services even in fully remote settings.

=== Director-General of the Directorate-General for Environment (DG ENV), 2020-2025 ===
In 2020, Fink-Hooijer became Director-General of the Directorate-General for Environment. In this role, she has been a key architect of the transformative environmental and green economic agenda under the European Green Deal, with a focus on circular economy, biodiversity, and zero pollution.

Her leadership has laid the foundations for a green industrial policy within the Single Market, including the creation of a market for secondary raw materials to reduce dependence on critical raw materials. This is exemplified by the innovative Batteries Regulation (entered into force on 17 August 2023) and the Ecodesign for Sustainable Products Regulation (entered into force on 18 July 2024), both of which promote sustainability principles such as mandatory minimum recycled content. By promoting a regulatory approach on circularity, she contributed to strengthening the EU's competitive position in a rapidly changing economic landscape.

Recognizing the link between climate change and biodiversity loss, Fink-Hooijer prioritized initiatives to halt biodiversity decline, leading to the introduction of the first-ever Nature Restoration (entered into force on 18 August 2024) and Soil Health (proposed on 5 July 2023) Laws and the EU's pioneering anti-Deforestation Regulation (entered into force on 29 June 2023). She also guided the EU's negotiations for the Kunming-Montréal Global Biodiversity Framework, adopted by the 15th Conference of Parties (COP15) to the Convention on Biological Diversity (CBD) on 19 December 2022, and a key deliverable under the European Green Deal, further solidifying her role as a global advocate for nature-based solutions and smarter resource management.

In her capacity as Director-General for Environment, Fink-Hooijer also oversaw the revision of the Environmental Crime Directive (entered into force on 20 May 2024), setting new standards for environmental protection through criminal law and minimum rules with regards to the definition of criminal offences and penalties.

Under her leadership, further progress has been made toward a toxic-free environment through groundbreaking initiatives on air, water, soil, and chemicals, such as the updated Industrial and Livestock Rearing Emissions Directive (IED 2.0) (entered into force on 4 August 2024), the Zero Pollution Action Plan (adopted on 12 May 2021) and the Chemicals Strategy for Sustainability (adopted on 14 October 2020), providing regulatory predictability for industry, stimulating industrial competitiveness, and fostering investment in sustainable clean-tech solutions.

Additionally, Fink-Hooijer has become a global advocate for preserving green and blue water cycles and enhancing water efficiency, driving the development of an EU Water Resilience Agenda. With her "water-food security-nature policy nexus", Fink-Hoiijer is also contributing to a better EU preparedness to future economic and environmental shocks.

In October 2024, the European Ombudsman attested maladministration in the Directorate-General for Environment. Previously, the DG refused to disclose documents containing information in the lobbying activities of environmentalist NGOs regarding the Nature Restoration Law.

=== Director-General of the Health Emergency Preparedness and Response Authority (DG HERA), 2025-present ===
In 2025, with the focus on security of the 2nd mandate of Commission President Ursula von der Leyen, Florika Fink-Hooijer was appointed Director-General for DG HERA, the Health Emergency Preparedness and Response Authority. DG Hera's mandate is to ensure the availability of and access to medical countermeasures.

Under Florika's leadership, this has been defined as a task embedded within the core areas of competitiveness, economic security, and health security. Strengthening European resilience under her tenure means targeted investments also in European scientific and manufacturing capacities for priority threats such as respiratory or contact-based viruses with pandemic or epidemic potential (including the disease X), antimicrobial resistance, tick- and mosquito-borne infectious diseases induced by climate change and environmental degradation, as well as for chemical, biological, radiological, or nuclear (CBRN) threats of accidental or intentional nature. To reach this objective DG HERA is pursuing an end-to-end approach covering surveillance and early detection, investment in innovation and research into new vaccines, therapeutics or medical devices as well as manufacturing and eventually stockpiling. Under Florika's steer EU support to an open global health security architecture is also continuously promoted as part of an active EU health diplomacy.

Against the backdrop of an increasing geopolitical fragmentation and evolving risk landscape, Florika is putting a particular emphasis on developing civil military cooperation in the health security sector to mobilise dual benefit MCMs for civilian and military actors against CBRN threats, AI driven novel biosynthetic risks or in response to armed conflicts and mass casualties.

== Personal life ==
Fink-Hooijer speaks German, English, Dutch and French.

She is married to fellow European Commission official Johannes Jeroen Hooijer and has three adult children: Valentin, Benjamin and Charlotte Hooijer.
