= EPTV =

EPTV may refer to:

- European Parliament TV (EuroparlTV), a European online platform for webcasting
- Public Establishment of Television, Algerian national television company
- Emissoras Pioneiras de Televisão, a Brazilian television broadcaster
