= SRSS =

SRSS may refer to:

== Education ==
- Shaaban Robert Secondary School, Dar es Salaam, Tanzania
- School for Regulatory Studies and Supervision, part of the National Institute of Securities Markets, India
- Steinbach Regional Secondary School, Steinbach, Manitoba, Canada
- School on Radiological Safety Studies, a school at the Global Centre for Nuclear Energy Partnership

== Science and technology ==
- Square root of the sum of the squares
- Sun Ray Server Software

== Public administration ==
- Structural Reform Support Service, a department of the European Commission which supports reform efforts in the 28 EU countries

== Military ==
- Swing Role Surveillance System, another name for GlobalEye
- 98th Southern Range Support Squadron
