= Directorate-General for Legal Service =

The Legal Service of the European Commission (Le Service juridique – SJ) is the in-house legal counsel to the commission, located in Brussels. It ensures that Commission decisions comply with EU law, preventing or reducing the risk of subsequent litigation. It provides legal advice to the commission and its departments, and represents the Commission in court cases.

== Overview ==
Legal Service of the European Union
Established	1952
Polity	European Commission - European Union
Leader	Director-General
Teams	14
Responsible to	President of the Commission
Headquarters	Brussels, Belgium

== History of the Legal Service ==
The Legal Service was founded in 1952 as the Legal Service of the High Authority of the European Coal and Steel Community (ECSC). It was the vision of its first director, Michel Gaudet, to have a ‘corps of jurists’ to give legal advice to and act as legal representatives of the predecessors of the commission.

1958–1967. After the establishment of the European Economic Community (EEC) and the European Atomic Energy Community (Euratom), the three organizations – collectively referred to as the European Communities (EC) – had one Legal Service structured into three separate branches. The first leaders (directors, from 1960 director-generals) of these branches were Michel Gaudet (EEC), Robert Krawielicki (ECSC) and Theo Vogelaar (Euratom).

The Merger Treaty (or the Treaty of Brussels, signed on 8 April 1965 and implemented on 1 July 1967) established that the executive organs, the Commission and the Council of the EEC should replace the Council and the Commission of the Euratom, as well as the Council and High Authority of the ESCS. Following its entry into force, the three branches of the Legal Service were fused into a single department thus creating a unified Legal Service for the still legally independent European Communities.

The original, core functions of the Legal Service – the exclusive right to represent the Commission in courts and to give vis-à-vis legal advice to the Directorate-Generals on the interpretation of European law – did not change essentially since its creation. As the Legal Service is a “service of services”, its development followed that of the Commission's: its tasks are more diverse (as it deals with the legal background of all the commission's work), and the number of its members now exceeds 400 (including support staff). It always has, and - still does - play a uniquely central role in the executive branch of the European Union. The director-general still attends all meetings of the College of Commissioners.

== Mission of the Legal Service ==
The mission of the Legal Service is twofold:

=== To provide legal advice to the Commission in its functions ===
- drafting legislation
- conducting international negotiations
- acting as guardian of the Treaties
- exercising the implementing powers conferred on it by the Community legislator or by the Treaties

In their capacity as legal advisers, members of the Legal Service participate in inter-house consultations with other departments of the commission. Given its special role and the general rules of professional ethics, the members cannot give legal advice to individuals. The Legal Service also ensures the quality of legislation: its Quality of Legislation (LEG) team consults other departments from the point of view of legislative drafting rules.

=== To represent the Commission in litigation ===
The Legal Service's role as agent of the Commission in court is comparable to the traditional role of legal counsel: the Legal Service is the in-house counsel to the commission. According to Commission decision EEC of 8 July 1959, the Legal Service is the only entity authorized to represent the commission before the Courts, meaning the following jurisdictions: the jurisdictions of the European Union, national courts and tribunals (mostly for debt recovery), international courts (mainly WTO), the EFTA Court, the arbitral tribunals, such as ICSID (International Center for Settlements of Investment Dispute), Permanent Court of Arbitration (PCA), and amicus curiae. Most of the cases are before the Court of Justice of the European Union in Luxembourg. The director-general is empowered to designate the agents to act in front of the courts. In the most important cases, the director-general himself represents the Commission in front of the Court of Justice.

== Organization ==
The Legal Service is a horizontal service department directly under the authority of the President of the commission. The head of the Legal Service is its Director-General (currently: Alberto De Gregorio Merino), who is assisted by a deputy director-general (currently: Clemens Ladenburger). The Legal Service is composed of 14 teams that are responsible for different legal areas and policies. A director who reports to the director-general leads each team. The members of the Legal Service are expected to carry out the two main functions of the Legal Service (representation in court cases and legal advice). The different teams often cooperate on issues requiring multiple areas of expertise.

=== Organisation Chart of the Legal Service ===
https://ec.europa.eu/info/sites/info/files/organisation_charts/organisation-chart-legalservice_en.pdf
