= Directorate-General for Human Resources and Security =

The Directorate-General for Human Resources and Security (DG HR) is a Directorate-General of the European Commission.

The essential mission of the Directorate-General is to ensure the European Commission runs smoothly by laying down its policies on human resources and security.

== Human resources ==
- Career development;
- Rights and obligations;
- Health and welfare in the workplace;
- Equal opportunities and non discrimination
- Learning and development

== Security ==
- Preventing or responding to emergencies
- Raising awareness
- Investigating
- Data security and secure communications

== See also ==
- European Commissioner for Budget and Administration
- Trans European Services for Telematics between Administrations (TESTA)
- European Network and Information Security Agency
