= Cabinet (European Commission) =

Personal office of a European Commissioner

In the European Commission, a cabinet (the French pronunciation, cab-ee-nay, is used) is the personal office of a European Commissioner. The role of a cabinet is to give political guidance to its Commissioner. Technical policy preparation is handled by the European Civil Service. The term is not to be confused with the European Commission's top decision making-body known in EU-lexicon, as the "College of Commissioners" (referred to in most political systems as a cabinet).

== Composition ==
The Commissioner's cabinets are seen as the real concentration of power within the Commission and consist of six members, but the exact membership faces restrictions. Two must be women, no more than three can be of the same nationality as the Commissioner and it must also reflect the Union's regional diversity. However the exact make up does change throughout the Commissioner's term. The head member is known by its French translation: Chef de Cabinet.

== Special chefs ==
Special chefs are a meeting of a member of each cabinet (for a certain area), the legal service and the secretariat general. They perform last minute preparations to proposed laws before they go before the College of Commissioners, but they are a "political equivalent of a College of Cardinals" with a great degree of cloak and dagger work.

The most "special" of these is the group for inter-institutional relations (formerly Parliamentary affairs) as it provides the Commission with an early warning on what the European Parliament is thinking – before it rejects the Commission's proposals. The most astute civil servants get sent to these meetings.

The heads of cabinets meet weekly in the "Hebdo" – the most important meeting of European Civil Servants who direct the work of the Commission and the Commissioners.

== See also ==
- European Civil Service
- Secretariat-General of the European Commission
- Directorate-General for Legal Service (European Commission)
