= Cabinet (government) =

Group of high-ranking officials, usually representing the executive branch of government

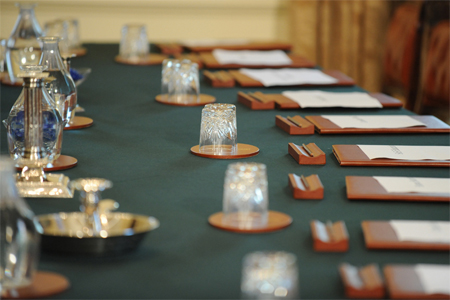
The cabinet table in the Cabinet Room at 10 Downing Street, official residence and office of the British prime minister in London

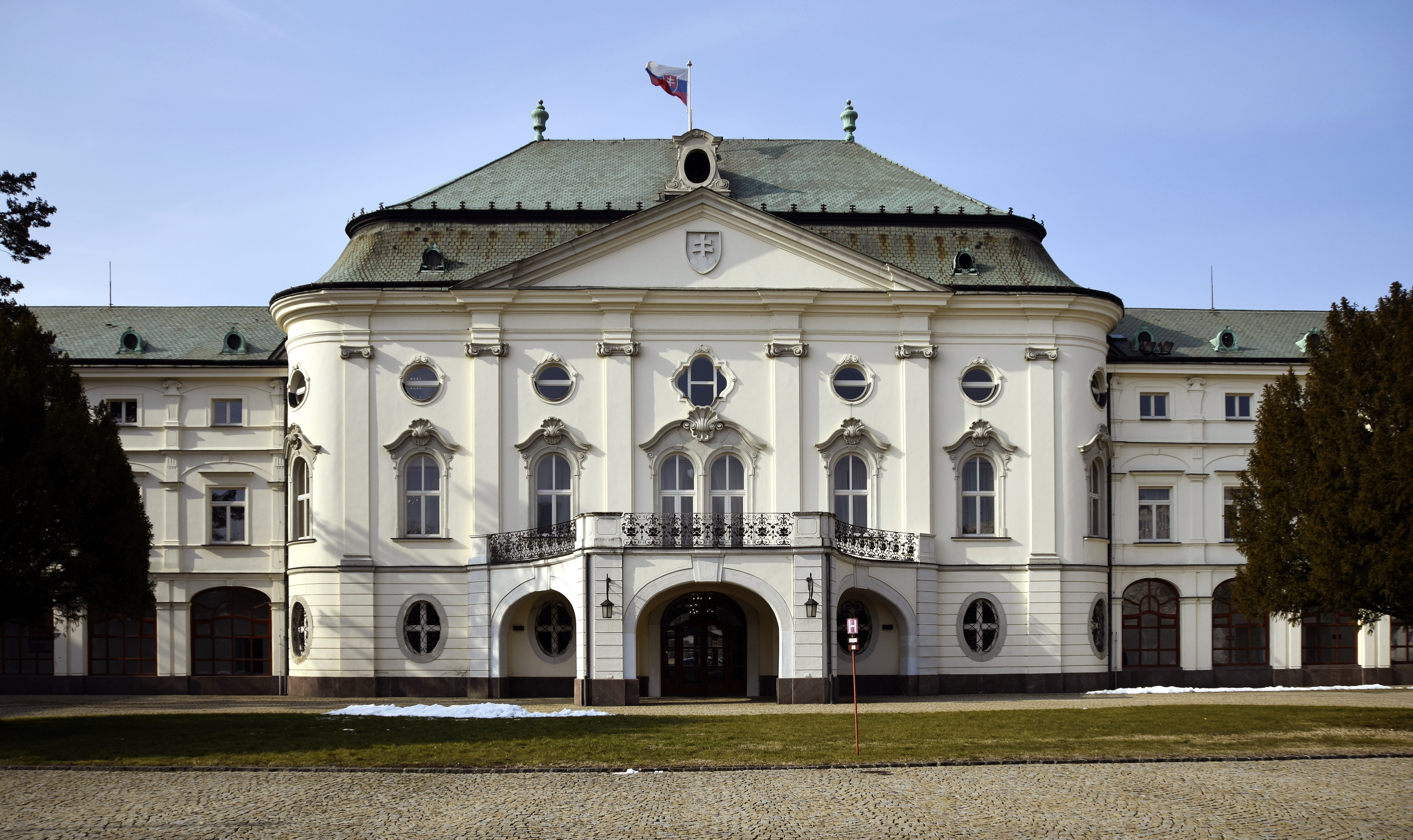
Episcopal Summer Palace, the seat of the government of Slovakia in Bratislava

A cabinet in governing is a group of people with the constitutional or legal task to rule a country or state, or advise a head of state, usually from the executive branch. Their members are known as ministers and secretaries and they are often appointed by either heads of state or government. Cabinets are typically the body responsible for the day-to-day management of the government and response to sudden events, whereas the legislative and judicial branches work in a measured pace, in sessions according to lengthy procedures.

The function of a cabinet varies: in some countries, it is a collegiate decision-making body with collective responsibility, while in others it may function either as a purely advisory body or an assisting institution to a decision-making head of state or head of government.

In some countries, particularly those that use a parliamentary system (e.g., the United Kingdom), the cabinet collectively decides the government's direction, especially in regard to legislation passed by the parliament. In countries with a presidential system, such as the United States, the cabinet does not function as a collective legislative influence; rather, their primary role is as an official advisory council to the head of government. In this way, the president obtains opinions and advice relating to forthcoming decisions.

Legally, under both types of system, the Westminster variant of a parliamentary system and the presidential system, the cabinet "advises" the head of state: the difference is that, in a parliamentary system, the monarch, viceroy, or ceremonial president will almost always follow this advice, whereas, in a presidential system, a president who is also head of government and political leader may depart from the cabinet's advice if they do not agree with it.

In practice, in nearly all parliamentary democracies that do not follow the Westminster system, and in three countries that do (Japan, Ireland, and Israel), very often the cabinet does not "advise" the head of state as they play only a ceremonial role. Instead, it is usually the head of government (usually called "prime minister") who holds all means of power in their hands (e.g. in Germany, Sweden, etc.) and to whom the cabinet reports.

In both presidential and parliamentary systems, cabinet officials administer executive branches, government agencies, or departments. Cabinets are also important originators for legislation. Cabinets and ministers are usually in charge of the preparation of proposed legislation in the ministries before it is passed to the parliament. Thus, often the majority of new legislation actually originates from the cabinet and its ministries.

== Terminology ==
In most governments, members of the cabinet are given the title of "minister", and each holds a different portfolio of government duties ("Minister of Foreign Affairs", "Minister of Health", etc.). In a few governments, as in the case of Mexico, the Philippines, the UK, and the U.S., the title of "secretary" is also used for some cabinet members ("Secretary of Education", or "Secretary of State for X" in the UK or the Netherlands). In many countries (e.g. Germany, Luxembourg, France, Spain, Scotland, etc.), a secretary (of State) is a cabinet member with an inferior rank to a minister. In Finland, a secretary of state is a career official that serves the minister.

While almost all countries have an institution that is recognisably a cabinet, the name of this institution varies. In many countries, (such as Ireland, Sweden, and Vietnam) the term "government" refers to the body of executive ministers; the broader organs of state having another name. Others, such as Spain, Poland, and Cuba, refer to their cabinet as a council of ministers, or the similar council of state. Some German-speaking areas use the term "senate" (such as the Senate of Berlin) for their cabinet, rather than the more common meaning of a legislative upper house. However, a great many countries simply call their top executive body the cabinet, including Israel, the United States, Venezuela, and Singapore, among others.

The supranational European Union uses a different convention: the European Commission refers to its executive cabinet as a "college", with its top public officials referred to as "commissioners", whereas a "European Commission cabinet" is the personal office of a European Commissioner.

The term comes from the Italian gabinetto, which originated from the Latin capanna, which was used in the sixteenth century to denote a closet or small room. From it originated in the 1600s the English word cabinet or cabinett which was used to denote a small room, particularly in the houses of nobility or royalty. Around this time the use of cabinet associated with small councils arose both in England and other locations such as France and Italy. For example, Francis Bacon used the term Cabanet Counselles in 1607.

The term is sometimes capitalized (as “Cabinet”) when referring to the government.

== Selection of members ==
In presidential systems such as the United States, members of the cabinet are chosen by the president, and may also have to be confirmed by one or both of the houses of the legislature (in the case of the U.S., it is the Senate that confirms members with a simple majority vote).

Depending on the country, cabinet members must, must not, or may be members of parliament. The following are examples of this variance:

- In most presidential systems, cabinet members cannot be sitting legislators at the same time. A legislator who is offered a cabinet position, wishes to accept it, and get confirmed for the position, must resign from their seat.
- In the countries utilising the Westminster system, such as the United Kingdom or Australia, cabinet ministers are traditionally appointed from among sitting members of the parliament. In the UK, it can be from either the House of Commons or the House of Lords.
- In countries with a strict separation between the executive and legislative branches of government (e.g. Luxembourg, Sweden, Switzerland, and Belgium), cabinet members must not simultaneously be a member of parliament; appointed/nominated cabinet members are required to give up their seat in parliament. In some countries, the outgoing MP may be substituted with another MP that comes from the same party as the former without going through a special or by-election.
- The intermediate case is where ministers may be members of parliament, but are not required to be, as in Finland and Spain.

Some countries that adopt a presidential system also place restrictions on who is eligible for nomination to cabinet based on electoral outcomes. For instance in the Philippines, candidates who have lost in any election in the country may not be appointed to cabinet positions within one (1) year of that election.

The candidate prime minister and/or the president selects the individual ministers to be proposed to the parliament, which may accept or reject the proposed cabinet composition. Unlike in a presidential system, the cabinet in a parliamentary system must not only be confirmed, but enjoy the continuing confidence of the parliament: a parliament can pass a motion of no confidence to remove a government or individual ministers. Often, but not necessarily, these votes are taken across party lines.

In some countries (e.g. the U.S.) attorneys general also sit in the cabinet, while in many others this is strictly prohibited, as the attorneys general are considered to be part of the judicial branch of government. Instead, there is a Minister of Justice, separate from the attorney general. Furthermore, in Sweden, Finland, and Estonia, the cabinet includes a Chancellor of Justice, a civil servant that acts as the legal counsel to the cabinet.

In multi-party systems, the formation of a government may require the support of multiple parties. Thus, a coalition government is formed. Continued cooperation between the participating political parties is necessary for the cabinet to retain the confidence of the parliament. For this, a government platform is negotiated, in order for the participating parties to toe the line and support their cabinet. However, this is not always successful: constituent parties of the coalition or members of parliament can still vote against the government, and the cabinet can break up from internal disagreement or be dismissed by a motion of no confidence.

The size of cabinets varies, although most contain around ten to twenty ministers. Researchers have found an inverse correlation between a country's level of development and cabinet size: on average, the more developed a country is, the smaller is its cabinet.

== Origins of cabinets ==
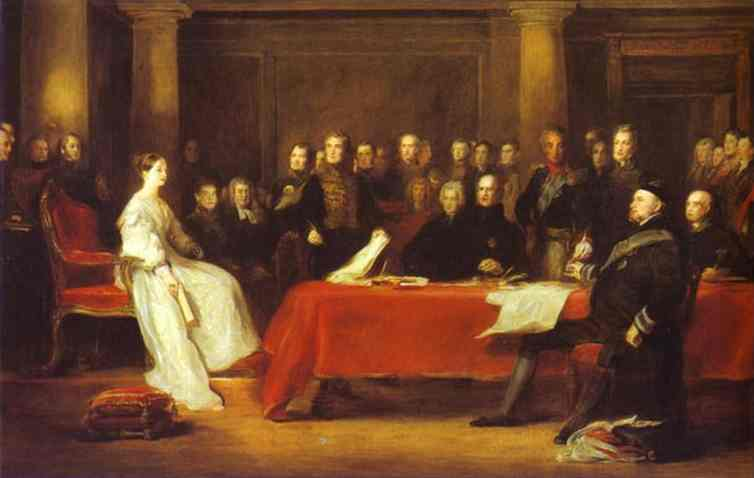
Queen Victoria convening her first Privy Council on the day of her accession in 1837

A council of advisers of a head of state has been a common feature of government throughout history and around the world. In Ancient Egypt, priests assisted the pharaohs in administrative duties. In Sparta, the Gerousia, or council of elders, normally sat with the two kings to deliberate on law or to judge cases. The Maurya Empire under the emperor Ashoka was ruled by a royal council. In Kievan Rus', the prince was obliged to accept the advice and receive the approval of the duma, or council, which was composed of boyars, or nobility. An inner circle of a few members of the duma formed a cabinet to attend and advise the prince constantly. The ruins of Chichen Itza and Mayapan in the Maya civilisation suggest that political authority was held by a supreme council of elite lords. In the Songhai Empire, the central government was composed of the top office holders of the imperial council. In the Oyo Empire, the Oyo Mesi, or royal council, were members of the aristocracy who constrained the power of the Alaafin, or king. During the Qing dynasty, the highest decision-making body was the Deliberative Council.

In the United Kingdom and its colonies, cabinets began as smaller sub-groups of the English Privy Council. The term comes from the name for a relatively small and private room used as a study or retreat. Phrases such as "cabinet counsel", meaning advice given in private to the monarch, occur from the late 16th century, and, given the non-standardised spelling of the day, it is often hard to distinguish whether "council" or "counsel" is meant.

The Oxford English Dictionary credits Francis Bacon in his Essays (1605) with the first use of "Cabinet council", where it is described as a foreign habit, of which he disapproves: "For which inconveniences, the doctrine of Italy, and practice of France, in some kings' times, hath introduced cabinet counsels; a remedy worse than the disease".

Charles I began a formal "Cabinet Council" from his accession in 1625, as his Privy Council, or "private council", was evidently not private enough, and the first recorded use of "cabinet" by itself for such a body comes from 1644, and is again hostile and associates the term with dubious foreign practices. The process has repeated itself in recent times, as leaders have felt the need to have a Kitchen Cabinet or "sofa government".

== Parliamentary cabinets ==
Countries with prime ministers (blue), those that formerly had that position (dark red), and those that never had that position (gray)

Under the Westminster system, members of the cabinet are Ministers of the Crown who are collectively responsible for all government policy. All ministers, whether senior and in the cabinet or junior ministers, must publicly support the policy of the government, regardless of any private reservations. Although, in theory, all cabinet decisions are taken collectively by the cabinet, in practice many decisions are delegated to the various sub-committees of the cabinet, which report to the full cabinet on their findings and recommendations. As these recommendations have already been agreed upon by those in the cabinet who hold affected ministerial portfolios, the recommendations are usually agreed to by the full cabinet with little further discussion. The cabinet may also provide ideas on/if new laws were established, and what they include. Cabinet deliberations are secret and documents dealt with in cabinet are confidential. Most of the documentation associated with cabinet deliberations will only be publicly released a considerable period after the particular cabinet disbands, depending on provisions of a nation's freedom of information legislation.

In theory the prime minister or premier is first among equals. However, the prime minister is ultimately the person from whom the head of state will take advice (by constitutional convention) on the exercise of executive power, which may include the powers to declare war, use nuclear weapons, and appoint cabinet members. This results in the situation where the cabinet is de facto appointed by and serves at the pleasure of the prime minister. Thus, the cabinet is often strongly subordinate to the prime minister as they can be replaced at any time, or can be moved ("demoted") to a different portfolio in a cabinet reshuffle for "underperforming".

This position in relation to the executive power means that, in practice, any spreading of responsibility for the overall direction of the government has usually been done as a matter of preference by the prime minister – either because they are unpopular with their backbenchers, or because they believe that the cabinet should collectively decide things.

A shadow cabinet consists of the leading members, or frontbenchers, of an opposition party, who generally hold critic portfolios "shadowing" cabinet ministers, questioning their decisions and proposing policy alternatives. In some countries, the shadow ministers are referred to as spokespersons.

The Westminster cabinet system is the foundation of cabinets as they are known at the federal and provincial (or state) jurisdictions of Australia, Canada, India, Pakistan, South Africa, and other Commonwealth countries whose parliamentary model is closely based on that of the United Kingdom.

== Cabinet of the United States ==
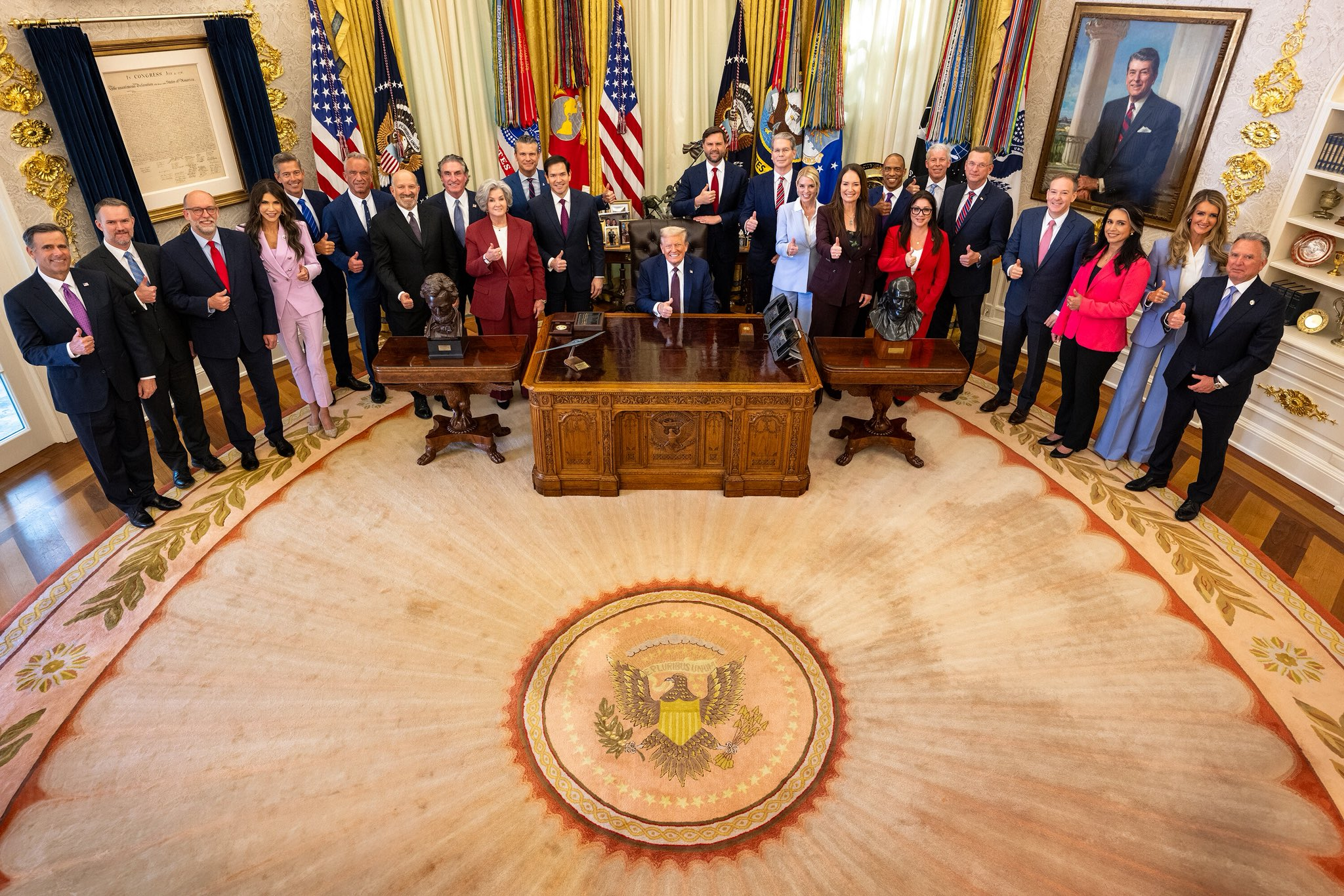
President Donald Trump's cabinet, 2025

Under the doctrine of separation of powers in the United States, a cabinet under a presidential system of government is part of the executive branch. In addition to administering their respective segments of the executive branch, cabinet members are responsible for advising the head of government on areas within their purview.

They are appointed by and serve at the pleasure of the head of government and are therefore strongly subordinate to the president as they can be replaced at any time. Normally, since they are appointed by the president, they are members of the same political party, but the executive is free to select anyone, including opposition party members, subject to the advice and consent of the Senate.

Normally, the legislature or a segment thereof must confirm the appointment of a cabinet member; this is but one of the many checks and balances built into a presidential system. The legislature may also remove a cabinet member through a usually difficult impeachment process.

In the cabinet, members do not serve to influence legislative policy to the degree found in a Westminster system; however, each member wields significant influence in matters relating to their executive department. Since the administration of Franklin D. Roosevelt, the President of the United States has acted most often through his own executive office or the National Security Council rather than through the cabinet as was the case in earlier administrations.

Although the term "Secretary" is usually used to name the most senior official of a government department, some departments have different titles to name such officials. For instance, the Department of Justice uses the term "Attorney General" instead of "Justice Secretary", but the Attorney General is nonetheless a cabinet-level position.

Following the federal government's model, state executive branches are also organised into executive departments headed by cabinet secretaries. The government of California calls these departments "agencies" or informally "superagencies", while the government of Kentucky styles them as "cabinets".

== Local government in England ==
In England since the Local Government Act 2000, local authorities may be led by either a council leader (elected by the council from among their members) or a directly elected mayor, who appoints a cabinet (legally called an executive), typically from councillors of the same party. Each member of a local government cabinet is empowered to make decisions within the scope of their portfolio, as defined by the leader or mayor, on behalf of the council. Under the Localism Act 2011, larger local authorities may alternatively be organised on a committee system without a cabinet.

== Scotland ==
=== Scottish Government cabinet ===
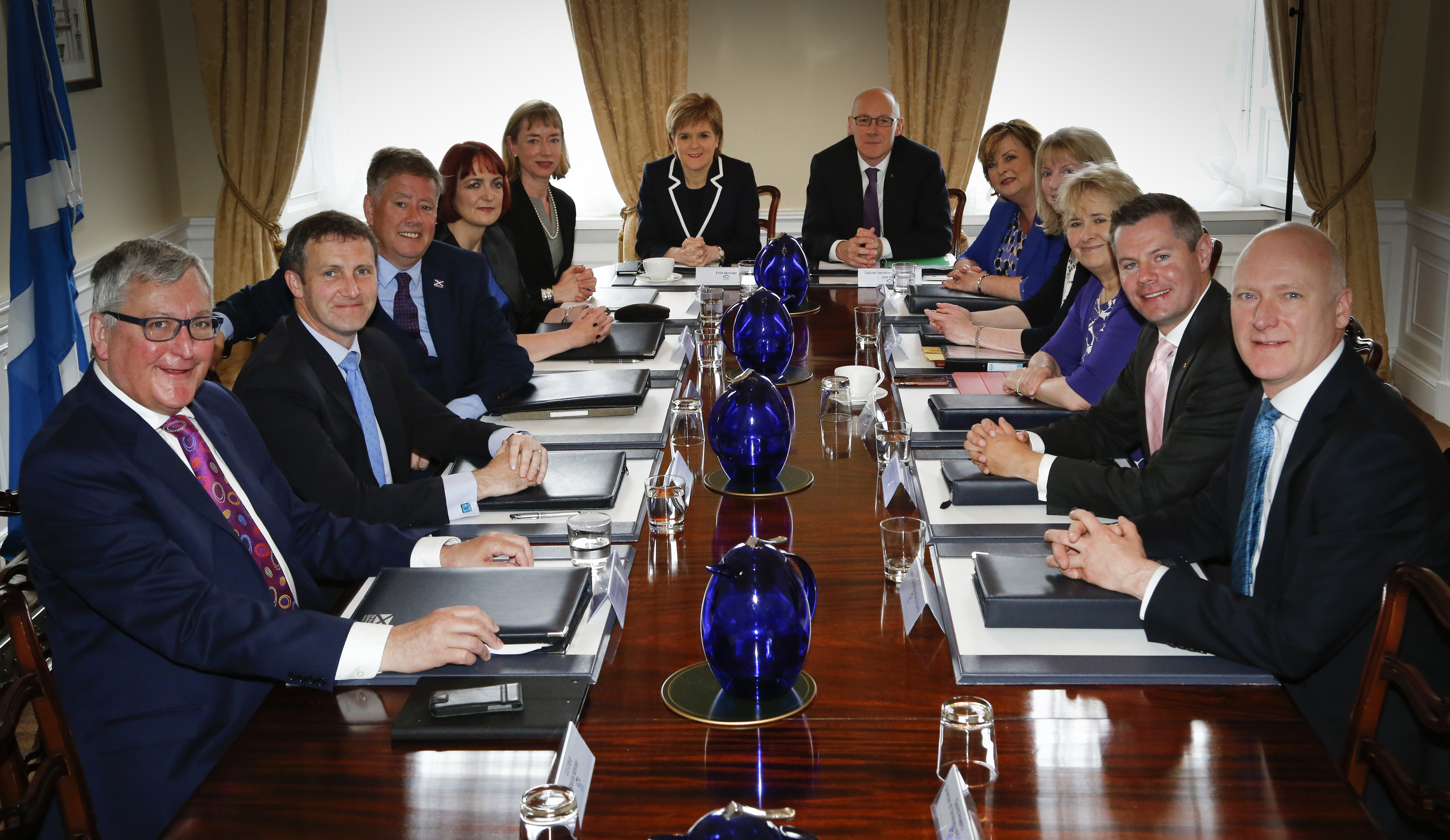
The second cabinet of Nicola Sturgeon meeting at Bute House in Edinburgh

Members of the Scottish cabinet are usually appointed on the decision of the First Minister of Scotland, as well as individual interests in obtaining a Cabinet Secretary position along with prior experience as an MSP. Decisions made by the cabinet are subject to scrutiny from the Scottish Parliament on matters such as the budget and spending allocation. Cabinet ministers are free to openly discuss and share their opinions on matters at cabinet meetings, however, once decisions have been agreed, whether they agree or disagree, ministers are expected to "put on a united front" for the purpose of promoting government policy. The Scottish Government cabinet is headed by the first minister, and made up of the deputy first minister, cabinet secretaries of the Scottish Government, the Lord Advocate and Solicitor General for Scotland (the Scottish Law Officers), the Permanent Secretary to the Scottish Government and the Minister for Parliamentary Business.

=== Local government in Scotland ===
In Scotland, each of the 32 Subdivisions of Scotland are all governed by single-tier authorities designated as "councils". Councils are made up of councillors who are directly elected by the residents of the area they represent. Each council area is divided into a number of wards, and three or four councillors are elected for each ward. There are currently 1,226 elected councillors in Scotland.

The cabinet level of each council area is known commonly as the council administration, and typically comprise a group of councillors within the council who are able to command majority support. Minority administrations and majority administrations may be formed. Although coalition administrations are more typical, occasionally a majority administration is formed by a single political party, but this is uncommon due to the proportional voting system used in Scottish local elections. Despite being uncommon on the Scottish mainland, it is possible for independent politicians to form an administration. Typically, councils are led by a Leader of the council, who serves as the chair of the council cabinet (or administration, as it is commonly known in Scotland), whilst ceremonial duties are largely conducted by the Provost.

== Communist system ==
Communist states can be ruled de facto by the politburo, such as the Politburo of the Communist Party of the Soviet Union. This is an organ of the communist party and not a state organ, but due to one-party rule, the state and its cabinet (e.g. Government of the Soviet Union) are in practice subordinate to the politburo. Technically, a politburo is overseen and its members selected by the central committee, but in practice it was often the other way around: powerful members of the politburo would ensure their support in the central committee through patronage. In China, political power has been further centralised into the Politburo Standing Committee of the Chinese Communist Party.

== See also ==
- Cabinet collective responsibility
- Council of Ministers
- Council of State
- Demissionary cabinet
- Individual ministerial responsibility
- Ministry
- National Cabinet (Australia)
- Privy council
- Royal court
- Rump cabinet
- War cabinet
