= Directorate-General for Economic and Financial Affairs =

The Directorate-General for Economic and Financial Affairs (DG ECFIN) is a Directorate-General of the European Commission, founded in 1958. It is located in Brussels, Belgium. Its main responsibility is to encourage the development of Economic and Monetary Union both inside and outside the European Union, by advancing economic policy coordination, conducting economic surveillance and providing policy assessment and advice.

It is one of the largest Directorate-Generals in the Commission, with a staff of about 2,000 people.

== Policy areas ==
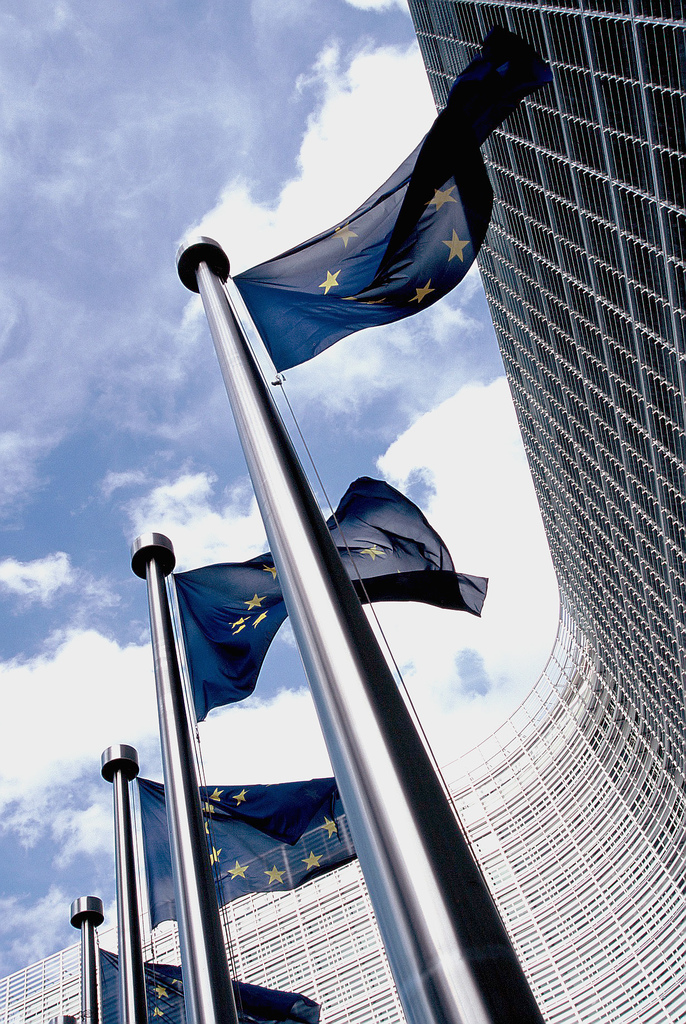
The European Commission

The Directorate-General's policy areas include:

- Economic surveillance (euro area and EU)
  - Monitoring of the economy of the euro area and of the EU
  - Key indicators
  - Economic forecasts (spring and autumn)
  - Business and consumer surveys
  - Annual Review on the EU economy
  - Convergence reports
- Monitoring budgetary policy and public finances
  - Stability and Growth Pact (SGP) and fiscal surveillance
  - Annual « Public Finance Report »
  - Contribution of public finances to economic growth and employment
  - The consequences of ageing
- Economic policy coordination
  - BEPG (Broad Economic Policy Guidelines, described as the EU's Stability and Growth Pact) (incl. Implementation report)
  - Structural reforms
  - Luxembourg, Cardiff and Cologne processes
  - Assessing the policy-mix in the euro area
- The euro: legal, practical and institutional aspects
  - Legal and institutional issues of the euro
  - Euro coins
  - Update and maintenance of the Commission's euro web site
- Financial markets and capital movement
  - Integration of EU financial markets
  - Freedom of capital movements
- Economic relations with third countries
  - Accession countries: economic aspects of enlargement
  - G7 Countries
  - Russia
  - Western Balkan Countries, Mediterranean Countries, and development issues
  - Macro-financial assistance to third countries
  - Relations with international financial institutions (International Monetary Fund, World Bank, EBRD,...)
- Financing
  - Investment Financing
  - EIB
  - EIF
  - Funding Programmes for SMEs
  - Funding for Trans-European Networks
  - Euratom loans
  - Opinions and surveys on investments for the European Coal and Steel Community (ECSC)

== See also ==
- European Commissioner for Economy
- Economic and Monetary Union of the European Union
- Economy of the European Union
- General Agreement on Tariffs and Trade (GATT)
- United Nations Monetary and Financial Conference (Bretton Woods)
