= Directorate-General for Taxation and Customs Union =

The Directorate-General for Taxation and Customs Union (DG TAXUD) is a Directorate-General of the European Commission. The DG Taxation and Customs manages, defends and develops the customs union as a vital part of protecting the external borders of the European Union. It also co-ordinates taxation policy across the European Union.

== Structure ==
The Directorate-General is presently organised into five directorates:

- Directorate A: Customs
- Directorate B: Digital Delivery of Customs and Taxation Policies
- Directorate C: Indirect Taxation and Tax Administration
- Directorate D: Direct taxation, Tax Coordination, Economic Analysis and Evaluation
- Directorate E: International and General Affairs

The department is headed by Director-General Mr Gerassimos Thomas, a Greek national. Since January 2022, Mr Thomas is supported by a Principal Adviser for Strategy and Economic Analysis Coordination.

Previously, the Directorate-General was organised into the following five directorates:

- Directorate A: Customs Policy, Legislation, Tariff
- Directorate B: Security & Safety, Trade Facilitation & International coordination
- Directorate C: Indirect Taxation and Tax Administration
- Directorate D: Direct taxation, Tax Coordination, Economic Analysis and Evaluation
- Directorate E: Resources and International Affairs

== See also ==
- European Commissioner for Economy
- Customs union
- Single European Act
- General Agreement on Tariffs and Trade (GATT)
