= Directorate-General for Climate Action =

The Directorate-General for Climate Action (DG CLIMA), est. 2010, is a Directorate-General of the European Commission responsible for EU's international negotiations on climate, development and implementation of the EU Emissions Trading System and production of the "European Green Deal" transformation plan. The current Director-General Kurt Vandenberghe was appointed on 16 January 2023. The 2022 Commissioner was Frans Timmermans (DG head Mauro Petriccione).

The DG is closely related to the Directorate General for Environment and Directorate General for Energy.

In 2020 it had 209 employees.

== See also ==
- European Commissioner for Climate Action
- EU Carbon Border Adjustment Mechanism
