= Agenda 2000 =

Action programme of the European Union

Agenda 2000 was an action programme of the European Union whose main objectives were to reform the Common Agricultural Policy and Regional policy, and establish a new financial framework for the years 2000–06 with a view to the then upcoming Eastern Enlargement of the European Union.

== History ==
Agenda 2000 was developed in response to a December 1995 request by the Madrid European Council for an analysis of what enlargement would mean for the EU, as ten countries — Poland, Hungary, the Czech Republic, Slovakia, Slovenia, Estonia, Latvia, Lithuania, Cyprus, and Malta — would join. The report was presented in July 1997. Its stated goals were:

1. "to update the European Model of Agriculture"
2. "to narrow the gaps in wealth and economic prospects between regions"
3. "to honour priorities while enjoying only very modest increases in budget income until 2006"

The reforms in Agenda 2000 divided the CAP into two 'Pillars': production support and rural development. Building on the 1992 MacSharry reforms to the CAP, Agenda 2000 proposed to further reduce the prices of cereal, arable crops, milk, and beef, increasing direct payments to farmers to compensate.

Agenda 2000 was adopted by European Council in Berlin in March 1999, albeit with substantial changes to its agricultural reforms. The Agenda 2000 reforms began late in the summit, as NATO's decision to launch air strikes on Serbia overshadowed the agenda, and were intensely debated by member-states. In particular, Jacques Chirac opposed further cuts to farm subsidies.
