= Directorate-General for the Environment =

Agency of the European Commission

Directorate-General for Environment (DG ENV) is a Directorate-General of the European Commission, responsible for the Environmental policy of the European Union. Initially known as DG XI, in 2010 "relevant [climate change] activities in DG Environment" were moved from DG ENV to the new DG Climate Action (DG CLIMA). It retains competence for zero pollution, circular economy, and biodiversity. It is currently led by Director-General Eric Mamer. The DG ENV supports the work of the Commissioner for Environment, Water Resilience and a Competitive Circular Economy, Jessika Roswall.

== Mission ==
The DG's main role is to initiate and define new environmental legislation and to ensure that measures, which have been agreed, are actually put into practice in the member states of the European Union. The overall mission statement for 2005 is: "Protecting, preserving and improving the environment for present and future generations, and promoting sustainable development". The mission statement is divided into the following sub-statements:

- To maintain and improve the quality of life through a high level of protection of our natural resources, effective risk assessment and management and the timely implementation of Community legislation.
- To foster resource efficiency in production, consumption and waste-disposal measures.
- To integrate environmental concerns into other EU policy areas.
- To promote growth in the EU that takes account of the economic, social and environmental needs both of our citizens and of future generations.
- To address the global challenges facing us notably combating climate change and the international conservation of biodiversity.
- To ensure that all policies and measures in the above areas are based on a multi-sectoral approach, involve all stakeholders in the process and are communicated in an effective way.

== Structure ==
DG Environment is based in Brussels and organised into an Office of the Director-General, Deputy Director-General, a strategy unit (Unit ENV.01) and 6 directorates:

- A: General Affairs, Knowledge & Resources
- B: Competitive Circular Economy & Clean Industrial Policy
- C: Zero Pollution, Water Resilience & Green Urban Transition
- D: Biodiversity
- E: Compliance, Governance & Support to the Member States
- F: Green Diplomacy & Multilateralism

== History ==
EU environmental policy started as a collection of disparate laws which had no specific Treaty basis. There was no department dedicated to environmental issues for the first 15 years of the European Commission's existence. In 1973 the Environmental Unit was created within DG Industry and in 1981 the Environment Directorate-General DG was established. However, it remained a relatively weak DG in the Commissioner for several years due to lack of institutional experience and human resources; 5 officials in 1973 had grown to 60 officials in the 1980s.

In its early years, DG Environment hired specialists with technical knowledge who had a different culture to the other Commission's officials. This ‘gave [it] a reputation for being dominated by […] “ecological freaks”'. Over time DG Environment matured and settled into the Commission's ways of working. In particular by taking politics more into consideration when formulating legislation so that it could be adopted and better implemented.

The Fifth Environmental Action Programme which came into force on 1 January 1993 marked a change in DG Environment's approach to policy-making. It attempted to present the DG and its policies in a more contemporary and constructive light. The programme demonstrated that legislation was no longer to be made solely behind closed doors, but together with all social and economic partners.

In November 2016 the EC harmonised the names of all DGs to make them more consistent and dropped "the" from the name, changing from "Directorate-General for the Environment" to "Directorate-General for Environment".

== Resources ==
The Directorate-General for Environment has a staff of about 460 civil servants.

- Commissioner: Jessika Roswall
- Director General: Eric Mamer

Past commissioners:

- Virginijus Sinkevičius, 2019–2024
- Karmenu Vella, 2014–2019
- Janez Potočnik, 2009–2014
- Stavros Dimas, 2004–2009
- Margot Wallström, 1999–2004

== See also ==
- European Commissioner for Environment, Oceans and Fisheries
- Aarhus Convention
- Directorate-General for Climate Action
- Directorate-General for Maritime Affairs and Fisheries
- Directorate-General of the Joint Research Centre (DG JRC)
- European Environment Agency
- EU environmental policy
- European Commissioner for the Environment
