= EuroparlTV =

europarltv

- Screenshot Main page in English as of 17 September 2008
- Website type: Online broadcasting of the European Parliament's activities
- Website: europarltv.europa.eu
- Commercial: No
- Launched: 17 September 2008
- Current status: Active

EuroparlTV is the webTV of the European Parliament. The service includes news, debates, interviews, educational videos, archived content as well as live streaming of parliamentary sessions and committee meetings. All videos are subtitled in all 24 official languages of the European Union (EU), whilst the “Young Parliament” programmes are voiced over in all EU languages.

EuroparlTV was launched in 2008. The Parliament awarded via an international call for tender procedure the development of the webTV to two separate private contractors: the content is produced by ICF Mostra, a Brussels-based communication agency wholly owned by ICF International. The technical platform (website, hosting and streaming) is managed by Twofour, broadcasting and communications company headquartered in Plymouth, U.K. EuroparlTV is funded via the Parliament's budget.

EuroparlTV has produced more than 4000 videos so far, with a frequency of 5-10 videos per week. It is easily accessible not only through the EuroparlTV website, but also through social media - Facebook, Twitter and YouTube. Since its 2008 launch, EuroparlTV has grown to count over 200 partners: local, regional and national TV stations, but also a number of websites across Europe.

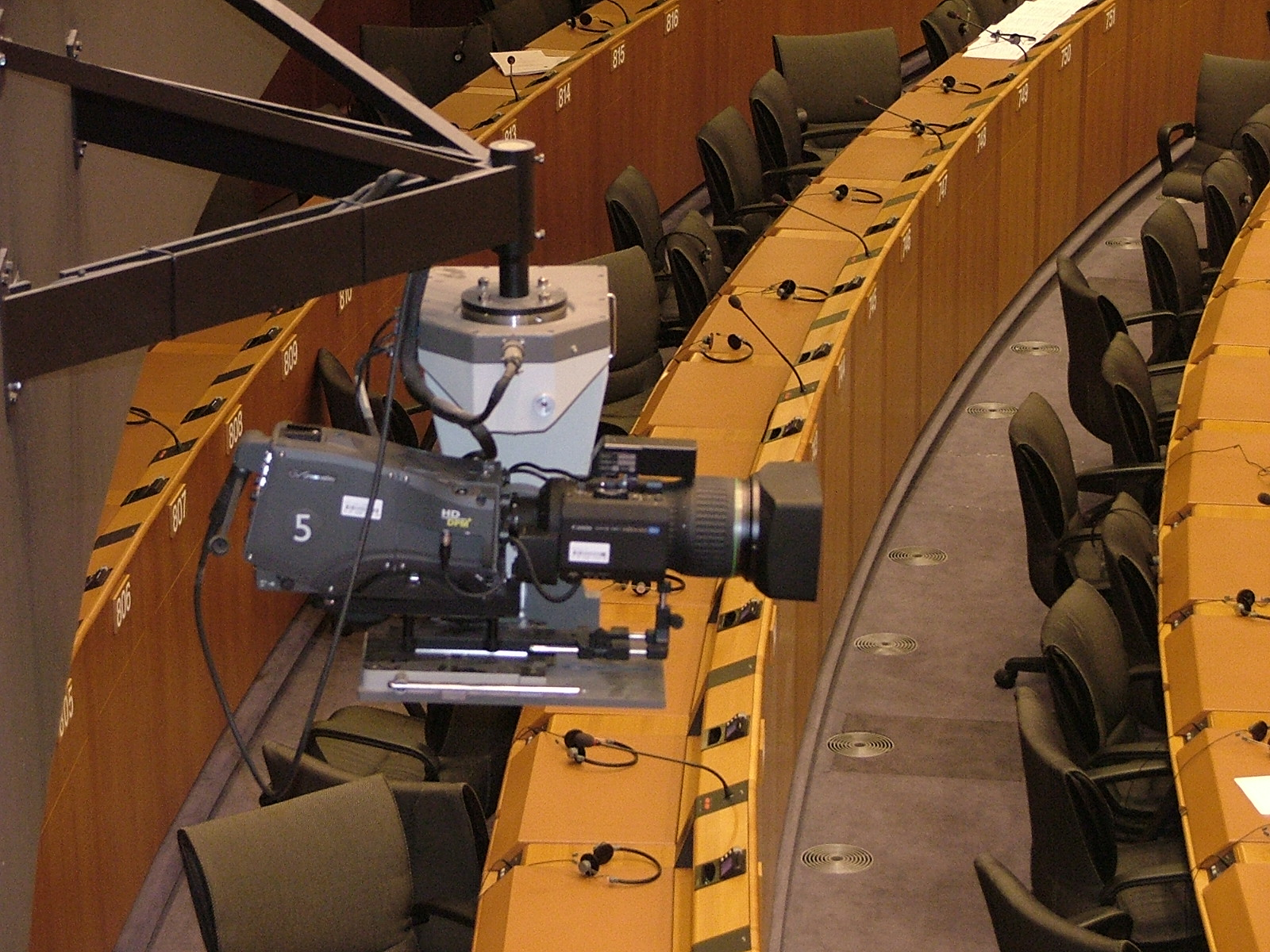
Camera in the hemicycle of the Paul-Henri Spaak building in Brussels

== Format ==
The content of EuroparlTV is divided into three "channels":

- Parliament News: provides comprehensive coverage of the business at the European Parliament. Current affairs and hot issues are presented in a snappy, fast-paced way through daily news, interviews, reportages and programmes.
- Young Parliament: a unique step in the direction of teachers and school-age kids. EuroparlTV's virtual character, "Blink", takes centre stage and explains European affairs to youngsters in the A-Z, Backstage and Eureka series. Since 2014, Young Parliament section is not produced anymore.
- Discover Parliament: explains, taking a step back, what Parliament stands for in the great European scheme of things. The History section takes users down memory lane as it looks back at key moments of European history.

One separate section offers live streaming of the European Parliament's plenary and committee meetings.

== See also ==
- Europe by Satellite, equivalent service for the European Commission
