= Directorate-General for Communication =

The Directorate-General for Communication (DG COMM) is a Directorate-General of the European Commission.

The mission of the DG Communication is:

- To inform the media and citizens of the activities of the European Commission and to communicate the objectives and goals of its policies and actions.
- To inform the Commission of the evolution of opinion in the Member States.

The DG Communication is based in Brussels.

== Organisation ==
=== Commissioner ===
- 2019-2024: Ursula von der Leyen

=== Director-general ===
- 2023– Dana Spinant
