= Directorate-General for Structural Reform Support =

European Union reform support programme

- Abbreviation: DG REFORM
- Formation: June 2017; 9 years ago
- European Commissioner for Cohesion and Reforms: Elisa Ferreira
- Website: https://reform-support.ec.europa.eu

The Directorate-General for Structural Reform Support (DG REFORM) is the European Union body assisting European Member States in the implementation of technical and structural reforms. The Directorate-General succeeds the Structural Reform Support Service (SRSS) as of 1 January 2020 and coordinates the European Commission's work on designing and implementing national reforms and to coordinate and provide technical support to Member States through the Technical Support Instrument.

== History ==
The SRSS was created in June 2015 as a replacement for multiple different temporary Task Forces, each established on an ad hoc basis; instead, the EU's structural reform expertise would be centralised in a single organisational unit. It was initially headed by Maarten Verwey, who, as its Director-General, oversaw the Service's operations regarding the implementation of the Third Economic Adjustment Programme for Greece. Verwey's powers were described as "unprecedented", and his suitability for the position was questioned.

== Operations ==
In December 2015, shortly after the SRSS' creation, Cyprus' government announced that they would cease cooperation with the World Health Organization towards a goal of a National Health Service, instead choosing to work exclusively with the SRSS.

In 2018, the Irish government sought out assistance from the SRSS with regard to university funding. Ministers from the government described the SRSS as offering a "comprehensive examination".

During the same year, the SRSS, jointly with the European Bank for Reconstruction and Development, released a report on economic development in Estonia. Focusing particularly on the financial technology industry, the report found "good conditions" for development of capital markets in the country.

Between 2018 and 2020, the Service conducted a review of methods to tackle violence and bullying among minors in Slovenia. Separately, it was also assigned the task of reforming bankruptcy procedures in Bulgaria, with a view to complying with requirements for entry into the European Exchange Rate Mechanism. The Bulgarian project deadline was June 2019.

In 2019, the SRSS funded a research project in Croatia investigating alternatives to the Standard Cost Model, a framework for measuring and quantifying administrative and regulatory burdens imposed on the private sector.

== See also ==
- European Commissioner for Cohesion and Reforms
