= Directorate-General =

Administrative branch of the European Commission

Within the European Union (EU), Directorates-General are departments with specific zones of responsibility. Within the European Commission specifically, Directorates-General are the equivalent of national-level ministries. Most are headed by a European commissioner, responsible for the general direction of the Directorate-General, and in charge of (politically responsible for) the corresponding policy area; and a director-general, responsible for the management of day-to-day affairs, who reports to the European Commissioner.

Nearly all of the top-level organisational divisions of the Secretariat of the European Parliament and the General Secretariat of the Council of the European Union are also termed Directorates-General.

The European Patent Office (part of the European Patent Organisation, separate from the EU) also has Directorates-General, which are administrative groupings of departments.

== Directorates-General of the European Commission ==
The Directorates-General of the European Commission are divided into four groups: Policy DGs, External relations DGs, General Service DGs and Internal Service DGs. Internally, the DGs are referred to by their abbreviations, provided below.

Departments (DGs)
DG	Abbreviation	Relevant Commissioner
Administration and Payment of Individual Entitlements	PMO	European Commissioner for Inter-Institutional Relations and Administration
Agriculture and Rural Development	AGRI	European Commissioner for Agriculture and Rural Development
Budget	BUDG	European Commissioner for Financial Programming and the Budget
Climate Action	CLIMA	European Commissioner for Climate Action
Communication	COMM	European Commissioner for Communication
Communications Networks, Content and Technology	CNECT	European Commissioner for Digital Agenda
Competition	COMP	European Commissioner for Competition
Defence Industry and Space	DEFIS	European Commissioner for Internal Market
Digital Services	DIGIT	European Commissioner for Inter-Institutional Relations and Administration
Economic and Financial Affairs	ECFIN	European Commissioner for Economic and Financial Affairs
Education, Youth, Sport and Culture	EAC	European Commissioner for Education, Culture, Multilingualism and Youth
Employment, Social Affairs and Inclusion	EMPL	European Commissioner for Employment, Social Affairs and Inclusion
Energy	ENER	European Commissioner for Energy
Environment	ENV	European Commissioner for the Environment
European Anti-Fraud Office	OLAF	European Commissioner for Inter-Institutional Relations and Administration
European Civil Protection and Humanitarian Aid Operations	ECHO	European Commissioner for International Cooperation, Humanitarian Aid and Crisis Response
European Neighbourhood and Enlargement Negotiations	NEAR	European Commissioner for Enlargement and European Neighbourhood Policy
European Personnel Selection Office	EPSO	European Commissioner for Inter-Institutional Relations and Administration
Eurostat	ESTAT	European Commissioner for Taxation and Customs Union, Audit and Anti-Fraud
Financial Stability, Financial Services and Capital Markets Union	FISMA	European Commissioner for Financial Stability, Financial Services and Capital Markets Union
Service for Foreign Policy Instruments	FPI	High Representative of the Union for Foreign Affairs and Security Policy & Vice-President of the European Commission for a Stronger Europe in the World
Health and Food Safety	SANTE	European Commissioner for Health and Food Safety
Health Emergency Preparedness and Response Authority	HERA	European Commissioner for Health and Food Safety
Human Resources and Security	HR	European Commissioner for Inter-Institutional Relations and Administration
Infrastructure and Logistics in Brussels	OIB	European Commissioner for Inter-Institutional Relations and Administration
Infrastructure and Logistics in Luxembourg	OIL	European Commissioner for Inter-Institutional Relations and Administration
Inspire, Debate, Engage and Accelerate Action	IDEA	President of the European Commission
Internal Audit Service	IAS	European Commissioner for Justice, Fundamental Rights and Citizenship
Internal Market, Industry, Entrepreneurship and SMEs	GROW	European Commissioner for Industry and Entrepreneurship
International Partnerships	INTPA	European Commissioner for Development
Interpretation	SCIC	European Commissioner for Inter-Institutional Relations and Administration
Joint Research Centre	JRC	European Commissioner for Research, Innovation and Science
Justice and Consumers	JUST	European Commissioner for Justice, Fundamental Rights and Citizenship
Legal Service	SJ	President of the European Commission
Maritime Affairs and Fisheries	MARE	European Commissioner for Maritime Affairs and Fisheries
Migration and Home Affairs	HOME	European Commissioner for Home Affairs
Mobility and Transport	MOVE	European Commissioner for Transport
Publications Office of the European Union	OP	N/A
Regional and Urban Policy	REGIO	European Commissioner for Cohesion and Reforms
Research and Innovation	RTD	European Commissioner for Research, Innovation and Science
Secretariat-General	SG	President of the European Commission
Structural Reform Support	REFORM	European Commissioner for Cohesion and Reforms
Taxation and Customs Union	TAXUD	European Commissioner for Economy
Trade	TRADE	European Commissioner for Trade
Translation	DGT	European Commissioner for Inter-Institutional Relations and Administration

== Directorates-General of the European Parliament ==
In addition to its Legal Service, the Secretariat of the European Parliament is composed of several Directorates-General, each of which has an official abbreviation.

Directorates-General
Directorate-General (DG)	Abbreviation
DG for the Presidency	DG PRES
DG for Economy, Transformation and Industry	DG ECTI
DG for Cohesion, Agriculture and Social Policies	DG CASP
DG for Citizens' Rights, Justice and Institutional Affairs	DG IUST
DG for Budgetary Affairs	DG BUDG
DG for External Policies of the Union	DG EXPO
DG for Parliamentary Research Services	DG EPRS
DG for Communication	DG COMM
DG for Parliamentary Democracy Partnerships	DG PART
DG for Personnel	DG PERS
DG for Infrastructure and Logistics	DG INLO
DG for Translation and Clear Language	DG TRAD
DG for Logistics and Interpretation for Conferences	DG LINC
DG for Finance	DG FINS
DG for Innovation Technologies and Cybersecurity	DG ITEC
DG for Security and Safety	DG SAFE

== Directorates-General of the General Secretariat of the Council of the European Union ==
The General Secretariat of the Council of the European Union is composed of several Directorates-General, which are each headed by a respective director-general or deputy director-general.

Directorates-General
Directorate-General (DG)	Abbreviation
Competitiveness and Trade	COMPET
Economic and Financial Affairs	ECOFIN
General and Institutional Policy	GIP
Justice and Home Affairs	JAI
Legal Service	JUR
Agriculture, Fisheries, Social Affairs and Health	LIFE
External Relations	RELEX
Transport, Energy, Environment and Education	TREE
Communication and Information	COMM
Translation Service	LING
Organisational Development and Services	ORG
Digital Services	SMART

== See also ==
- List of European Commission committees by Directorates-General
- European Civil Service
- Joint Research Centre (European Commission)
- Permanent Secretary
- Council of the European Union
