= Directorate-General for Regional and Urban Policy =

Directorate-General of the European Commission

The Directorate-General for Regional and Urban Policy (DG REGIO) is a Directorate-General of the European Commission.

The DG Regional and Urban Policy is responsible for European Union measures to assist the economic and social development of the less-favored regions of the European Union under Articles 158 and 160 of the Treaty of Rome.

In 2020 it had 618 employees.

== Instruments - Funds ==
- European Regional Development Fund (ERDF);
- European Structural and Investment Funds (Cohesion Fund)
- Instrument for Structural Policies for Pre-Accession (ISPA)
- European Union Solidarity Fund

== See also ==
- European Social Fund
- European Commissioner for Cohesion and Reforms
