= Directorate-General for Interpretation =

The Directorate-General for Interpretation (also known as DG Interpretation and SCIC for its former French name Service Commun Interprétation-Conférences) is a Directorate-General of the European Commission. It is the European Commission's interpreting service and conference organiser and provides interpreters for around 11,000 meetings every year, thus being the largest interpreting service in the world.

DG Interpretation manages the allocation of Commission meeting rooms and provides support for the smooth running of meetings in many languages that are held there. It also organises conferences for Directorates-General and departments of the Commission, typically in the range of over 40 main events per year.

In 2016, Florika Fink-Hooijer became the Director-General of DG Interpretation. In 2020, Genoveva Ruiz Calavera took over the role after Fink-Hooijer stepped down.

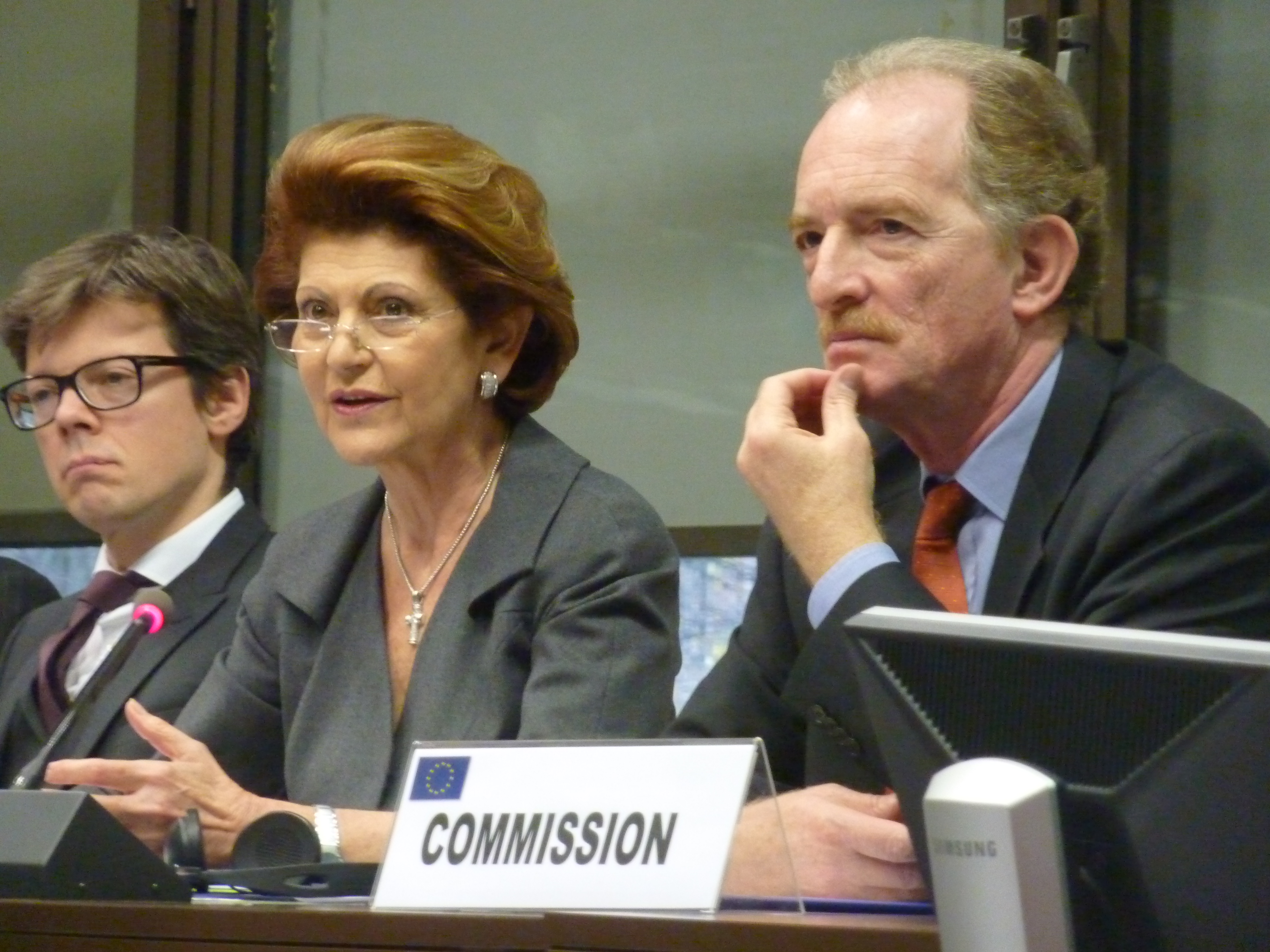
Androulla Vassiliou, former European Commissioner responsible for interpretation (until 2014), and Marco Benedetti, former head of Commission's Directorate-General for Interpretation

== See also ==
- European Commissioner for Budget and Administration
