= European Commission =

Executive branch of the European Union

(in other official languages)
Bulgarian	Европейска комисия
Czech	Evropská komise
Danish	Europa-Kommissionen
German	Europäische Kommission
Greek	Ευρωπαϊκή Επιτροπή
English	European Commission
Spanish	Comisión Europea
Estonian	Euroopa Komisjon
Finnish	Euroopan komissio
French	Commission européenne
Irish	Coimisiún Eorpach
Croatian	Europska komisija
Hungarian	Európai Bizottság
Italian	Commissione europea
Lithuanian	Europos Komisija
Latvian	Eiropas Komisija
Maltese	Kummissjoni Ewropea
Dutch	Europese Commissie
Polish	Komisja Europejska
Portuguese	Comissão Europeia
Romanian	Comisia Europeană
Slovak	Európska komisia
Slovene	Evropska komisija
Swedish	Europeiska kommissionen

Overview
- Established: 16 January 1958; 68 years ago
- Country: 27 member states: Austria; Belgium; Bulgaria; Croatia; Cyprus; Czech Republic; Denmark; Estonia; Finland; France; Germany; Greece; Hungary; Ireland; Italy; Latvia; Lithuania; Luxembourg; Malta; Netherlands; Poland; Portugal; Romania; Slovakia; Slovenia; Spain; Sweden
- Polity: European Union
- Leader: President of the Commission (Ursula von der Leyen since 1 December 2019)
- Appointed by: Nominated by the European Council and elected by the European Parliament
- Main organ: College of Commissioners
- Ministries: 33: Agriculture and Rural Development; Budget; Climate Action; Communication; Communications Networks, Content and Technology; Competition; Economic and Financial Affairs; Education and Culture; Employment, Social Affairs and Inclusion; Energy; Environment; European Civil Protection and Humanitarian Aid Operations; Eurostat; Financial Stability, Financial Services and Capital Markets Union; Health and Food Safety; Human Resources and Security; Informatics; Internal Market, Industry, Entrepreneurship and SMEs; International Cooperation and Development; Interpretation; Joint Research Centre; Justice and Consumers; Maritime Affairs and Fisheries; Migration and Home Affairs; Mobility and Transport; Neighbourhood and Enlargement Negotiations; Regional and Urban Policy; Research and Innovation; Taxation and Customs Union; Trade; Translation
- Responsible to: European Parliament
- Headquarters: Brussels, Belgium; Luxembourg City, Luxembourg
- Website: commission.europa.eu

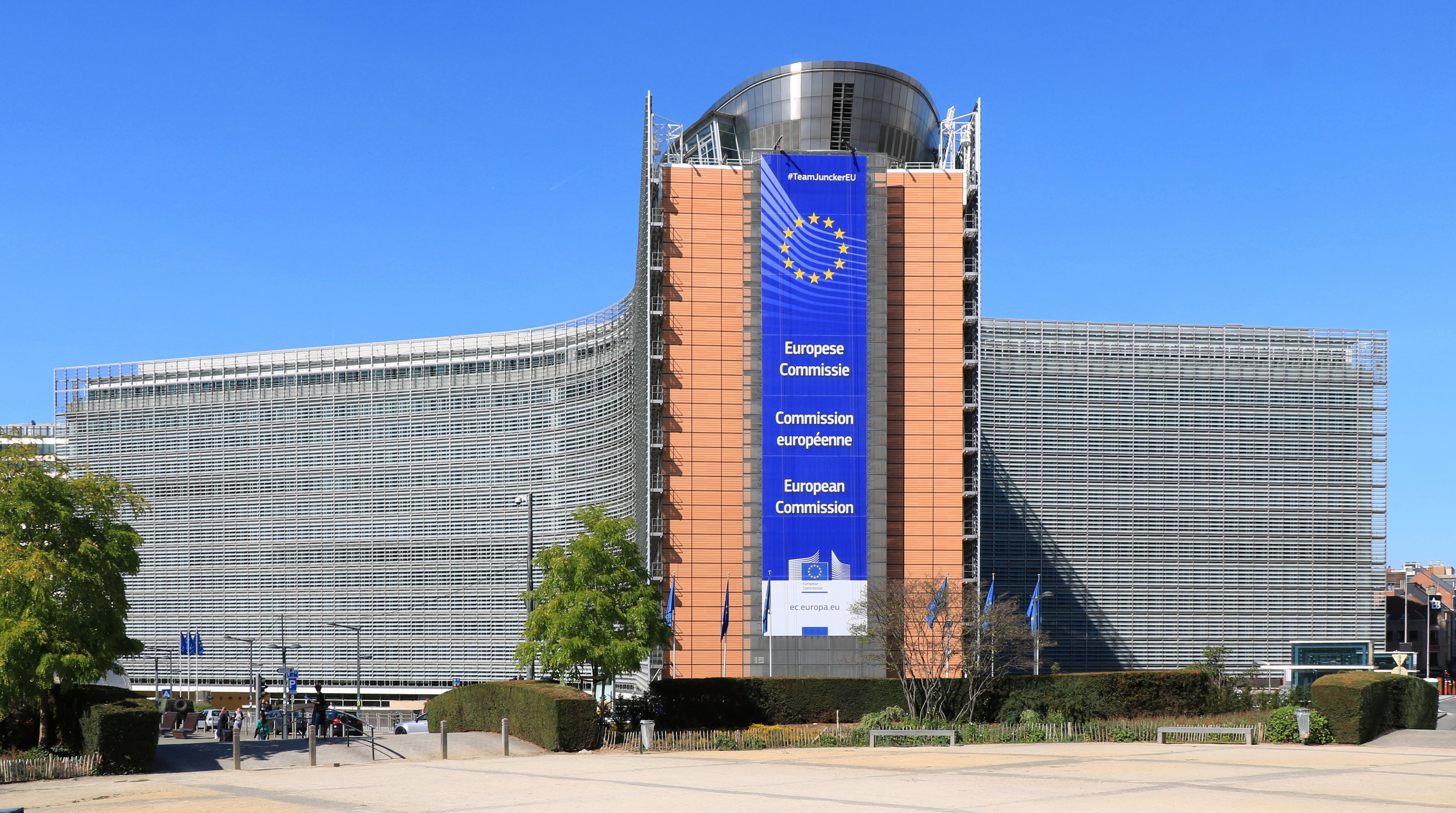
The Berlaymont building in Brussels, seat of the European Commission

The European Commission (EC) is the executive cabinet of the European Union. It is composed of 27 members of the Commission (known as commissioners) corresponding to the number of member states, unless the European Council, by unanimous consent, decides to alter this number.

The current number of commissioners is 27, including the president. It oversees an administrative body of about 32,000 European Civil Service employees. The commission is divided into departments known as Directorates-General (DGs), comparable to national ministries, each headed by a director-general (comparable to a permanent secretary) who is responsible to a commissioner.

Currently, there is one commissioner per member state, but members are bound by their oath of office to represent the interest of the EU as a whole rather than their home state. The Commission president (currently Ursula von der Leyen) is nominated by the European Council (the 27 heads of government) and must win the confidence of the European Parliament before assuming office. The Council of the European Union then nominates the other members of the Commission in agreement with the nominated president, and the entire cabinet is then subjected to a final vote of confidence in the European Parliament. A motion of no confidence passed by a two-thirds majority in the Parliament can force the resignation of the Commission.

The sitting cabinet is the second von der Leyen Commission, which took office in December 2024, following the 2024 European Parliament elections.

== History ==
The European Commission derives from one of the five key institutions created in the supranational European Community system, following the proposal of Robert Schuman, French Foreign Minister, on 9 May 1950. Originating in 1951 as the High Authority in the European Coal and Steel Community, the commission has undergone numerous reorganizations and seen its powers increase over time to respond to the increasing need for a strong executive to manage European integration.

=== Establishment ===
The first Commission originated in 1951 as the nine-member "High Authority" under President Jean Monnet (see Monnet Authority). The High Authority was the supranational administrative executive of the new European Coal and Steel Community (ECSC). It took office first on 10 August 1952 in Luxembourg City. In 1958, the Treaties of Rome had established two new communities alongside the ECSC: the European Economic Community (EEC) and the European Atomic Energy Community (Euratom). However, their executives were called "Commissions" rather than "High Authorities". The reason for the change in name was the new relationship between the executives and the Council. Some states, such as France, expressed reservations over the power of the High Authority and wished to limit it by giving more power to the Council rather than the new executives.

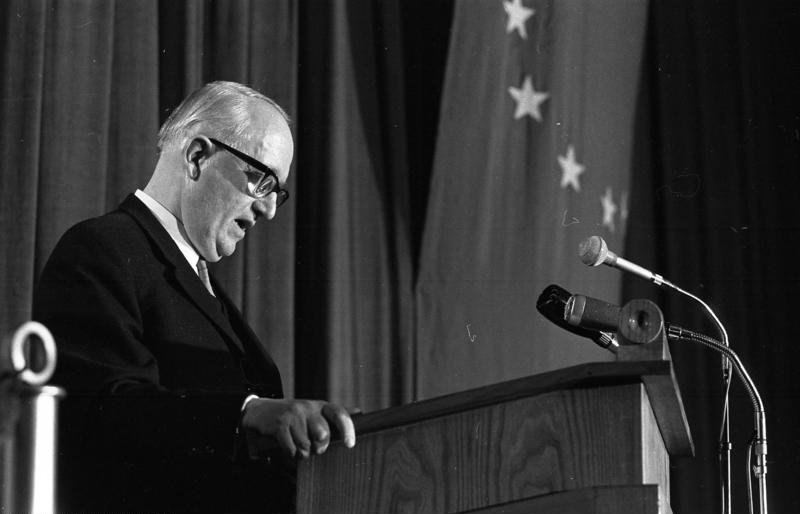
Walter Hallstein, the first president of the Commission

Louis Armand led the first Commission of Euratom. Walter Hallstein led the first Commission of the EEC, holding the first formal meeting on 16 January 1958 at the Château of Val-Duchesse. It achieved agreement on a contentious cereal price accord, as well as making a positive impression upon third countries when it made its international debut at the Kennedy Round of General Agreement on Tariffs and Trade (GATT) negotiations. Hallstein notably began the consolidation of European law and started to have a notable impact on national legislation. Little heed was taken of his administration at first but, with help from the European Court of Justice, his Commission stamped its authority solidly enough to allow future Commissions to be taken more seriously. In 1965, however, accumulating differences between the French government of Charles de Gaulle and the other member states on various subjects (British entry, direct elections to Parliament, the Fouchet Plan and the budget) triggered the "empty chair" crisis, ostensibly over proposals for the Common Agricultural Policy. Although the institutional crisis was solved the following year, it cost Étienne Hirsch his presidency of Euratom and later Walter Hallstein the EEC presidency, despite his otherwise being viewed as the most 'dynamic' leader until Jacques Delors.

Signed
In force
Document
1951
1952
Paris Treaty
1957
1958
Rome treaties: EEC Treaty Euratom Treaty
1965
1967
Merger Treaty
2007
2009
Lisbon Treaty

Commission of the European Atomic Energy Community
Commission of the European Communities
European Commission

High Authority of the European Coal and Steel Community

Commission of the European Economic Community

=== Early development ===
The Berlaymont building (pictured in 1974) became the seat of the Commission in 1967.

The three bodies, collectively named the European Executives, co-existed until 1 July 1967 when, under the Merger Treaty, they were combined into a single administration under President Jean Rey. Owing to the merger, the Rey Commission saw a temporary increase to 14 members—although subsequent Commissions were reduced back to nine, following the formula of one member for small states and two for larger states. The Rey Commission completed the Community's customs union in 1968 and campaigned for a more powerful, elected, European Parliament. Despite Rey being the first president of the combined communities, Hallstein is seen as the first president of the modern Commission.

The Malfatti and Mansholt Commissions followed with work on monetary co-operation and the first enlargement to the north in 1973. With that enlargement, the College of Commissioners membership increased to thirteen under the Ortoli Commission (the United Kingdom as a large member was granted two commissioners), which dealt with the enlarged community during economic and international instability at that time. The external representation of the Community took a step forward when President Roy Jenkins, recruited to the presidency in January 1977 from his role as Home Secretary of the United Kingdom's Labour government, became the first president to attend a G8 summit on behalf of the Community. Following the Jenkins Commission, Gaston Thorn's Commission oversaw the Community's enlargement to the south, in addition to beginning work on the Single European Act.

=== Jacques Delors (1985–1995) ===
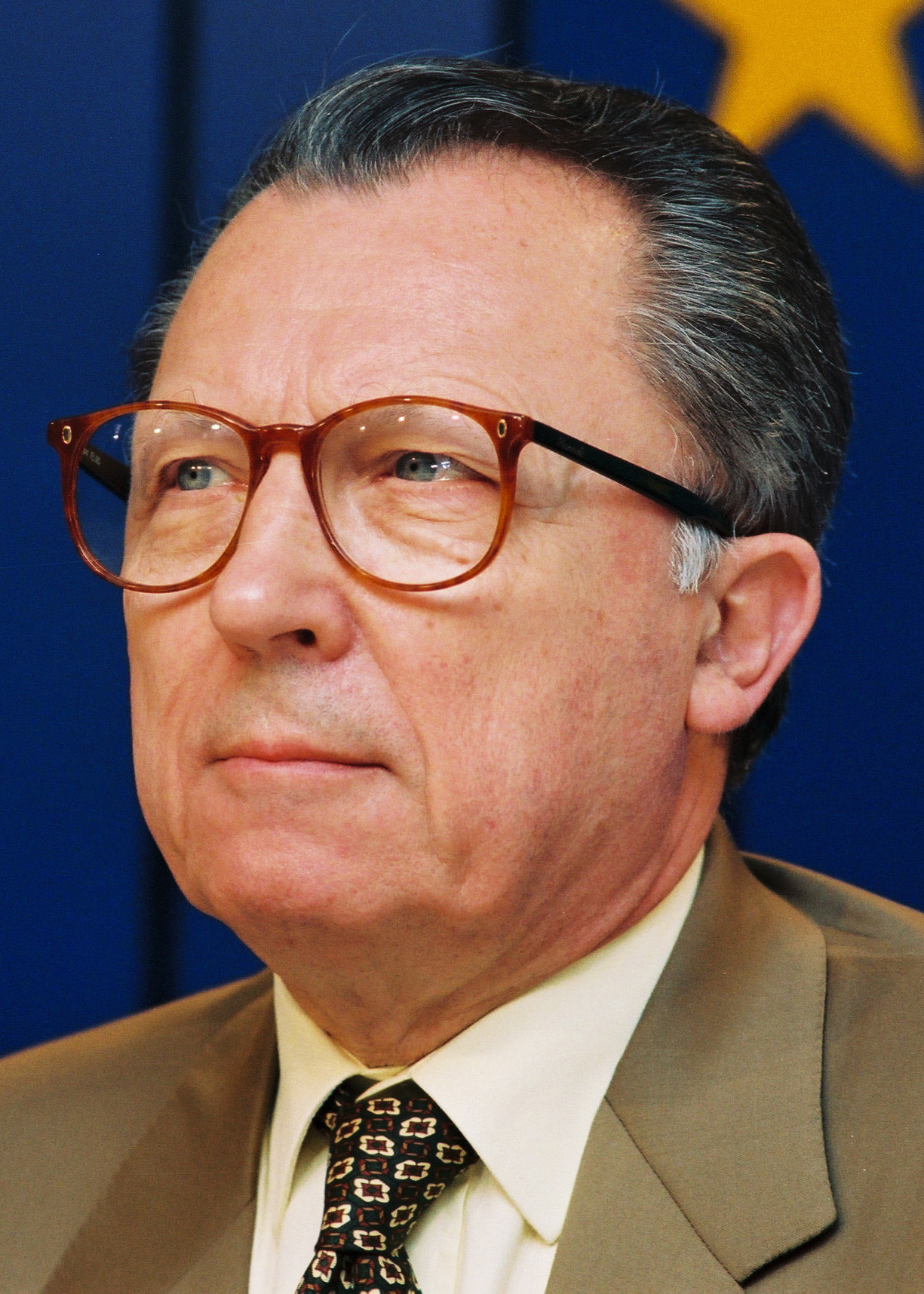
Jacques Delors, President of the European Commission from 1985 to 1994

The Commission headed by Jacques Delors was seen as giving the Community a sense of direction and dynamism. Delors and his College are also considered as the "founding fathers of the euro". The International Herald Tribune noted the work of Delors at the end of his second term in 1992: "Mr. Delors rescued the European Community from the doldrums. He arrived when Europessimism was at its worst. Although he was a little-known former French finance minister, he breathed life and hope into the EC and into the dispirited Brussels Commission. In his first term, from 1985 to 1988, he rallied Europe to the call of the single market, and when appointed to a second term he began urging Europeans toward the far more ambitious goals of economic, monetary, and political union".

=== Jacques Santer (1995–1999) ===
The successor to Delors was Jacques Santer. As a result of a fraud and corruption scandal, the entire Santer Commission was forced by the Parliament to resign in 1999. These frauds were revealed by internal auditor Paul van Buitenen, with French commissioner Édith Cresson being the main target of the allegations.

That was the first time a College of Commissioners had been forced to resign en masse, and represented a shift of power towards the Parliament. However, the Santer Commission did carry out work on the Treaty of Amsterdam and the euro. In response to the scandal, the European Anti-Fraud Office (OLAF) was created.

=== Romano Prodi (1999–2004) ===
Following Santer, Romano Prodi took office. The Amsterdam Treaty had increased the commission's powers and Prodi was dubbed by the press as something akin to a Prime Minister. Powers were strengthened again; the Treaty of Nice, signed in 2001, gave the Presidents more power over the composition of the College of Commissioners.

=== José Manuel Barroso (2004–2014) ===
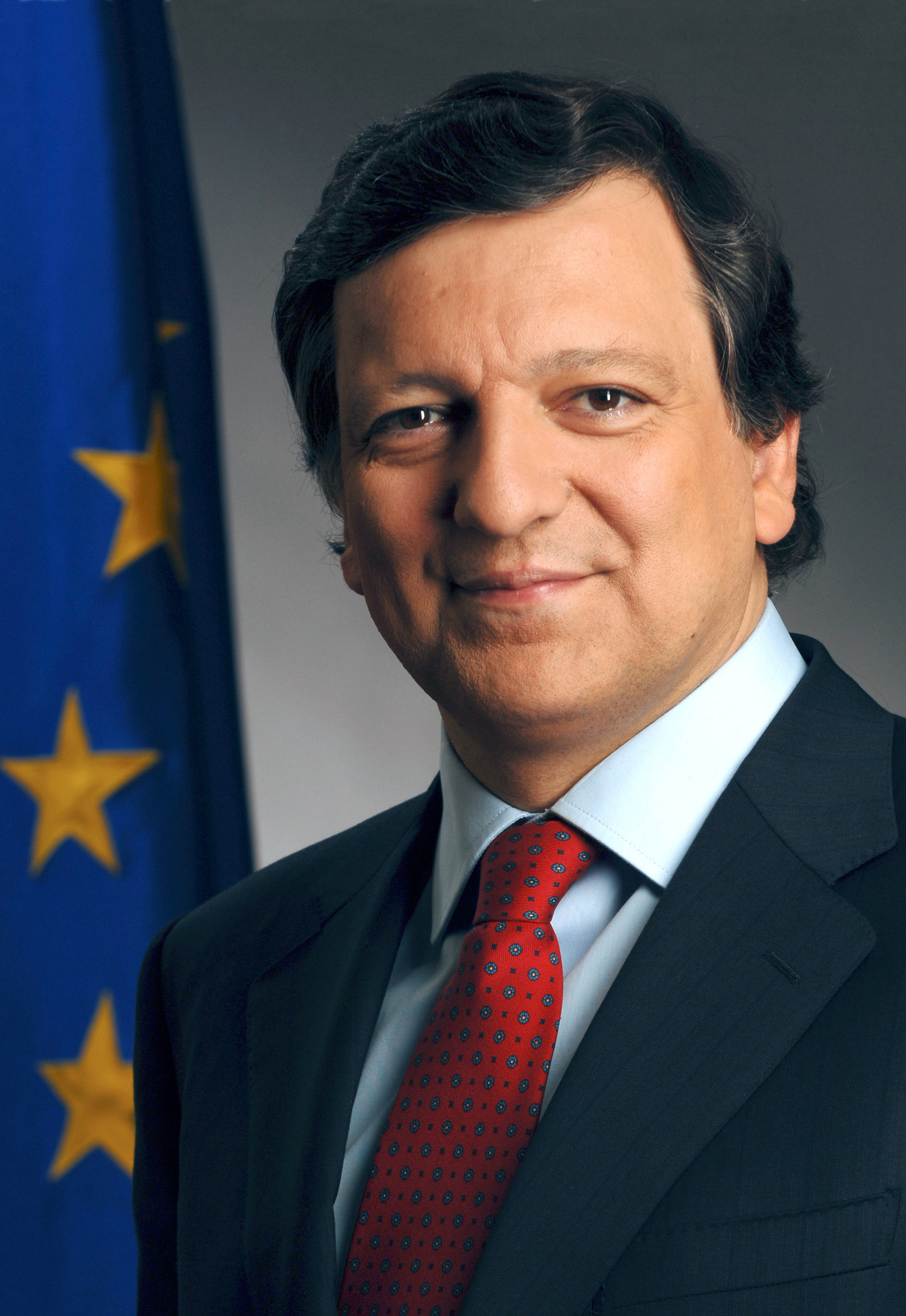
José Manuel Barroso, President of the European Commission president from 2004 to 2014

José Manuel Barroso became president in 2004: the Parliament once again asserted itself in objecting to the proposed membership of the Barroso Commission. Owing to this opposition, Barroso was forced to reshuffle his College before taking office. The Barroso Commission was also the first full Commission since the enlargement in 2004 to 25 members; hence, the number of commissioners at the end of the Prodi Commission had reached 30. As a result of the increase in the number of states, the Amsterdam Treaty triggered a reduction in the number of commissioners to one per state, rather than two for the larger states.

Allegations of fraud and corruption were again raised in 2004 by former chief auditor Jules Muis. A Commission officer, Guido Strack, reported alleged fraud and abuses in his department in the years 2002–2004 to OLAF, and was fired as a result. In 2008, Paul van Buitenen (the former auditor known from the Santer Commission scandal) accused the European Anti-Fraud Office (OLAF) of a lack of independence and effectiveness. During Barroso's presidency of the Commission, EU accession negotiations began with Croatia and Turkey in 2005. While Croatia officially became a member in 2013, Turkey's accession process remains effectively suspended.

Barroso's first Commission term expired on 31 October 2009. Under the Treaty of Nice, the first Commission to be appointed after the number of member states reached 27 would have to be reduced to "less than the number of Member States". The exact number of commissioners was to be decided by a unanimous vote of the European Council, and membership would rotate equally between member states. Following the accession of Romania and Bulgaria in January 2007, this clause took effect for the next Commission. The Treaty of Lisbon, which came into force on 1 December 2009, mandated a reduction of the number of commissioners to two-thirds of member-states from 2014 unless the Council decided otherwise. Membership would rotate equally and no member state would have more than one commissioner. However, the treaty was rejected by voters in Ireland in 2008 with one main concern being the loss of their commissioner. Hence a guarantee given for a rerun of the vote was that the council would use its power to amend the number of commissioners upwards. However, according to the treaties it still has to be fewer than the total number of members, thus it was proposed that the member state that does not get a commissioner would get the post of High Representative – the so-called 26+1 formula. This guarantee (which may find its way into the next treaty amendment, probably in an accession treaty) contributed to the Irish approving the treaty in a second referendum in 2009.

Lisbon also combined the posts of European Commissioner for External Relations with the council's High Representative for the Common Foreign and Security Policy. This post, also a vice-president of the Commission, would chair the Council of the European Union's foreign affairs meetings as well as the commission's external relations duties. The treaty further provides that the most recent European elections should be "taken into account" when appointing the president of the European Commission, and although they are still proposed by the European Council; the European Parliament "elects" candidates to the office, rather than "approves" them as under the Treaty of Nice.

The Barroso Commission is, in reaction to Euroscepticism, said to have toned down enforcement to increase integration.

=== Jean-Claude Juncker (2014–2019) ===
In 2014, Jean-Claude Juncker became President of the European Commission after campaigning as the candidate of the European People's Party (EPP). He was in office from 1 November 2014 to 30 November 2019.

Under the Juncker Commission, the EU General Data Protection Regulation was passed. The Commission co-developed the law, culminating in a trilogue proposal between the Commission, Parliament, and Council on 15 December 2015. The GDPR entered into force on 24 May 2016. The Commission abolished retail telephone and mobile data roaming charges in the member states and some others (Roam Like At Home).

=== Ursula von der Leyen (2019–present) ===
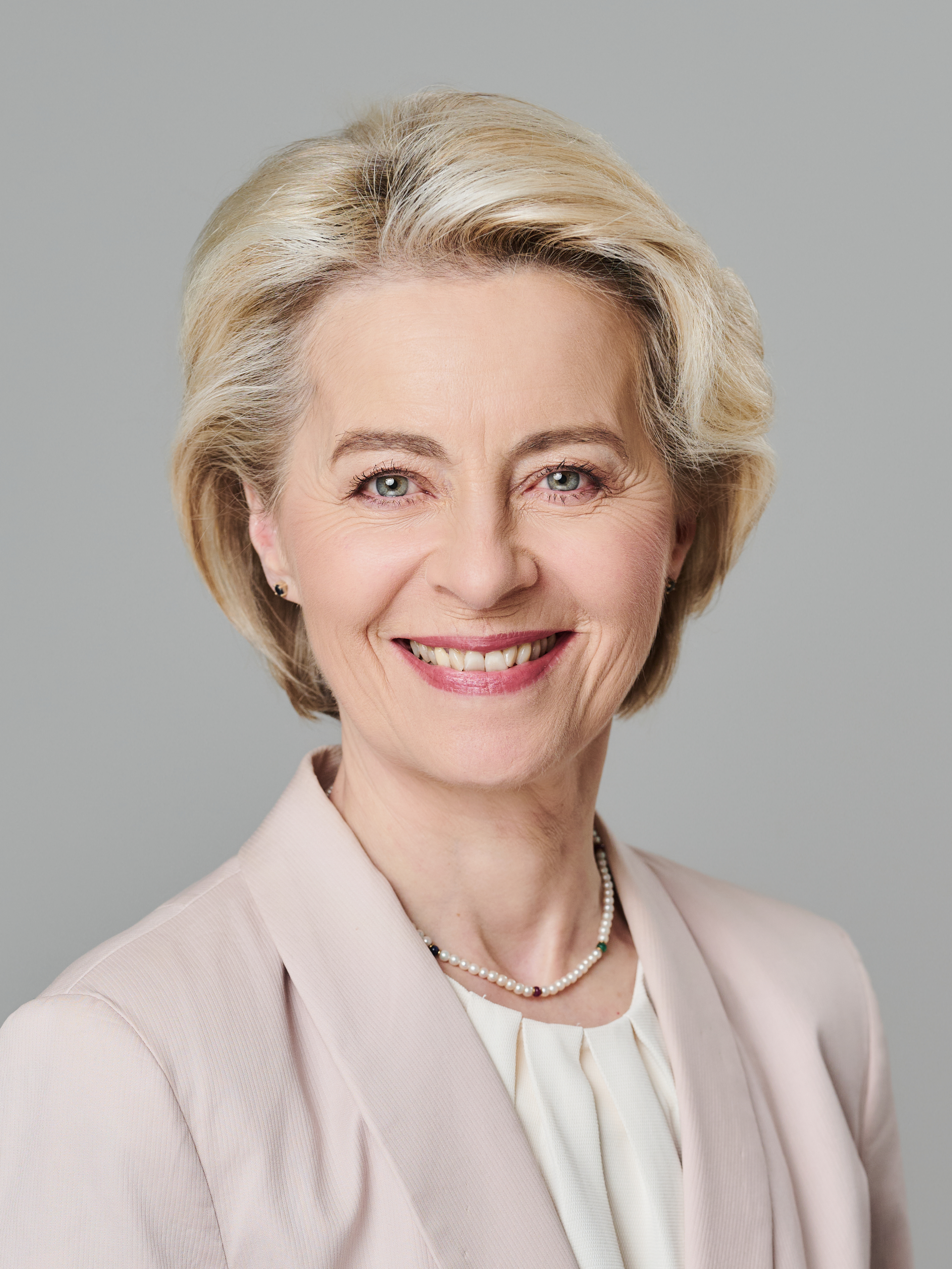
Ursula von der Leyen, commission president since 2019

In 2019, Ursula von der Leyen was appointed as President of the European Commission. She submitted the guidelines of her policy to the European Parliament on 16 July 2019, following her confirmation. She had not been considered a likely candidate (in general, the elected candidate is determined, according to the results of the European election, as winner of the internal election into the dominant European party known as "spitzenkandidat"). While the European People's Party had won the European Parliament election, they had performed worse than expected and therefore nominated von der Leyen instead of Manfred Weber, their original candidate. On 9 September, the Council of the European Union declared a list of candidate-commissioners, which are sent to Brussels by the governments of each member state and which had to be officially approved by the parliament.

In September 2024, Von der Leyen revealed her new team of European commissioners, marking a shift to a "leaner" and more interconnected structure. The lineup featured six executive vice-presidents (EVPs) from France, Finland, Estonia, Italy, Romania, and Spain. These EVPs, including Teresa Ribera and Stéphane Séjourné, were tasked with overseeing various clusters of commissioners and steering key policy areas such as prosperity, security, and democracy. Raffaele Fitto was appointed despite criticism from European socialists over his hard-right affiliations. Other notable appointments included Kaja Kallas as EVP for Foreign and Security Policy, and Henna Virkkunen as EVP for Tech Sovereignty and Digital Technologies. The Commission also introduced new roles like the Commissioner for Defence and Security and the Commissioner for the Mediterranean.

== Powers and functions ==
The commission was set up from the start to act as an independent supranational authority separate from governments; it has been described as "the only body paid to think European". The members are proposed by their member state governments, one from each. However, they are bound to act independently – free from other influences such as those governments which appointed them. This is in contrast to the Council of the European Union, which represents governments, the European Parliament, which represents citizens, the Economic and Social Committee, which represents organised civil society, and the Committee of the Regions, which represents local and regional authorities.

Through Article 17 of the Treaty on European Union the commission has several responsibilities: to develop medium-term strategies; to draft legislation and arbitrate in the legislative process; to represent the EU in trade negotiations; to make rules and regulations, for example in competition policy; to draw up the budget of the European Union; and to scrutinise the implementation of the treaties and legislation. The rules of procedure of the European Commission set out the commission's operation and organisation.

=== Executive power ===
Before the Treaty of Lisbon came into force, the executive power of the EU was held by the council: it conferred on the Commission such powers for it to exercise. However, the council was allowed to withdraw these powers, exercise them directly, or impose conditions on their use. This aspect has been changed by the Treaty of Lisbon, after which the Commission exercises its powers just by virtue of the treaties. Powers are more restricted than most national executives, in part due to the commission's lack of power over areas like foreign policy – that power is held by the Council of the European Union and the European Council, which some analysts have described as another executive.

Considering that under the Treaty of Lisbon, the European Council has become a formal institution with the power of appointing the commission, it could be said that the two bodies hold the executive power of the EU (the European Council also holds individual national executive powers). However, it is the Commission that currently holds most of the executive power over the European Union.

=== Legislative initiative ===
The Commission differs from the other institutions in that it alone has legislative initiative in the EU. Only the commission can make formal proposals for legislation: they cannot originate in the legislative branches. Under the Treaty of Lisbon, no legislative act is allowed in the field of the Common Foreign and Security Policy. In the other fields, the Council and Parliament can request legislation; in most cases the Commission initiates on the basis of these proposals. This monopoly is designed to ensure coordinated and coherent drafting of EU law. This monopoly has been challenged by some who claim the Parliament should also have the right, with most national parliaments holding the right in some respects. However, the Council and Parliament may request the commission to draft legislation, though the Commission does have the power to refuse to do so as it did in 2008 over transnational collective conventions. Under the Lisbon Treaty, EU citizens are also able to request the commission to legislate in an area via a petition carrying one million signatures, but this is not binding.

The commission's powers in proposing law have usually centred on economic regulation. It has put forward a large number of regulations based on a "precautionary principle". This means that pre-emptive regulation takes place if there is a credible hazard to the environment or human health: for example on tackling climate change and restricting genetically modified organisms. The European Commission has committed EU member states to carbon neutrality by 2050. This is opposed to weighting regulations for their effect on the economy. Thus, the Commission often proposes stricter legislation than other countries. Owing to the size of the European market, this has made EU legislation an important influence in the global market. On February 23, 2022, the European Commission published the Corporate Sustainability Due Diligence Directive which establishes a framework of due diligence for companies to identify actual or potential risks and harm to human rights and the environment as well as establishing processes and standards to diminish these risks. The Directive was officially adopted in 2024 and will be incorporated into domestic laws within two years by all of the European Union member states.

Recently the commission has moved into creating European criminal law. In 2006, a toxic waste spill off the coast of Côte d'Ivoire, from a European ship, prompted the commission to look into legislation against toxic waste. at that time did not even have a crime against shipping toxic waste; this led the Commissioners Franco Frattini and Stavros Dimas to put forward the idea of "ecological crimes". Their right to propose criminal law was challenged in the European Court of Justice but upheld. As of 2007, the only other criminal law proposals which have been brought forward are on the intellectual property rights directive, and on an amendment to the 2002 counter-terrorism framework decision, outlawing terrorism‑related incitement, recruitment (especially via the internet) and training.

=== Enforcement ===
Once legislation is passed by the Council and Parliament, it is the commission's responsibility to ensure it is implemented. It does this through the member states or through its agencies. In adopting the necessary technical measures, the commission is assisted by committees made up of representatives of member states and of the public and private lobbies (a process known in jargon as "comitology"). Furthermore, the commission is responsible for the implementation of the EU budget, ensuring, along with the Court of Auditors, that EU funds are correctly spent.

In particular the commission has a duty to ensure the treaties and law are upheld, potentially by taking member states or other institutions to the Court of Justice in a dispute. In this role it is known informally as the "Guardian of the Treaties". Finally, the Commission provides some external representation for the Union, alongside the member states and the Common Foreign and Security Policy, representing the Union in bodies such as the World Trade Organization. It is also usual for the President to attend meetings of the G7.

== College of Commissioners ==
The commission is composed of a "College of Commissioners" of 27 members, including the president and vice-presidents. Even though each member is nominated on the basis of the suggestions made by the national governments, one per state, they do not represent their state in the commission. In practice, however, they do occasionally press for their national interest. Once proposed, the president delegates portfolios among each of the members. The power of a commissioner largely depends upon their portfolio, and can vary over time. For example, the Education Commissioner has been growing in importance, in line with the rise in the importance of education and culture in European policy-making. Another example is the Competition Commissioner, who holds a highly visible position with global reach. Before the commission can assume office, the college as a whole must be approved by the Parliament. Commissioners are supported by their personal cabinet who give them political guidance, while the Civil Service (the DGs, see below) deal with technical preparation.

=== Appointment ===
The Commission's meeting room on floor 13 of the Berlaymont

The president of the Commission is appointed in an indirect election. The candidate is first selected by the European Council, according to the Qualified Majority Vote (QMV), taking into account the latest parliamentary elections (any person from the largest party can be picked). That candidate then faces approval by the European Parliament. If the European Parliament fails to elect the candidate, the European Council shall propose another within one month.

Following the selection of the president, and the appointment of the High Representative by the European Council, each commissioner is proposed by their member state (except for those states who provided the president and High Representative) in consultation with the Commission president and the Council of the European Union, who formally adopts the list of candidates. The president's proposed College of Commissioners is then subject to hearings at the European Parliament which will question them and then vote on their suitability as a whole. If the European Parliament submits a negative opinion of a candidate, the president must either reshuffle them or request a new candidate from the member state to avoid the college's outright rejection by the European Parliament. Once the college is approved by parliament, it is formally appointed following a QMV vote by the European Council.

Following the college's appointment, the president appoints a number of vice-presidents from among the commissioners. Vice-presidents manage policy areas involving multiple commissioners. One of these includes the High Representative, who is automatically one of the vice-presidents ex officio rather than by appointment and confirmation. Commonly referred to as the 'HR/VP' position, the High Representative also coordinates commissioners' activities involving the external relations and defence cooperation of the European Union. The von der Leyen Commission also created the position of more senior executive vice-presidents, appointed from the three largest political groups in the European Parliament. Unlike the other vice-presidents, their mission is to manage the incumbent Commission's top priority policy areas, for which they receive additional support from a dedicated Directorate-General.

=== Dismissal ===
The European Parliament can dissolve the College of Commissioners as a whole following a vote of no-confidence, which requires a two-thirds vote.

Only the president can request the resignation of an individual commissioner. However, individual commissioners, by request of the council or Commission, can be compelled to retire on account of a breach of obligation(s) and if so ruled by the European Court of Justice (Art. 245 and 247, Treaty on the Functioning of the European Union).

=== Political styles ===
The Barroso Commission took office in late 2004 after being delayed by objections from the Parliament, which forced a reshuffle. In 2007 the Commission increased from 25 to 27 members with the accession of Romania and Bulgaria who each appointed their own commissioners. With the increasing size of the commission, Barroso adopted a more presidential style of control over the college, which earned him some criticism.

However, under Barroso, the commission began to lose ground to the larger member states as countries such as France, the UK and Germany sought to sideline its role. This has increased with the creation of the president of the European Council under the Treaty of Lisbon. There has also been a greater degree of politicisation within the Commission.

== Administration ==
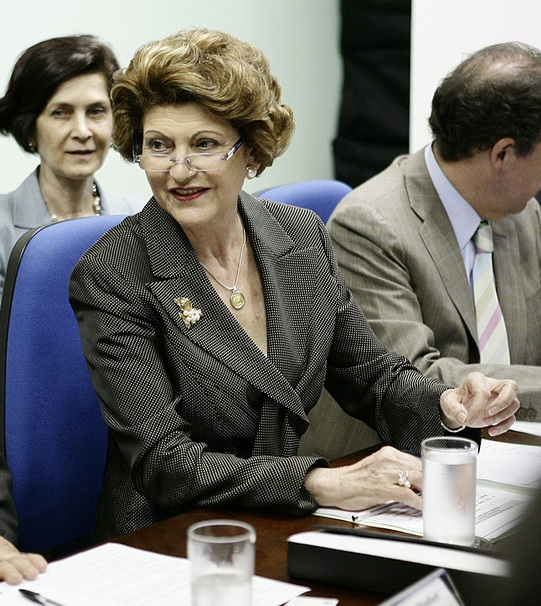
Cypriot politician Androulla Vassiliou was European Commissioner for Education, Culture, Multilingualism and Youth between 2010 and 2014.

The commission is divided into departments known as Directorates-General (DGs) that can be likened to departments or ministries. Each covers a specific policy area such as agriculture or justice and citizens' rights or internal services such as human resources and translation and is headed by a director-general who is responsible to a commissioner. A commissioner's portfolio can be supported by numerous DGs; they prepare proposals for them and if approved by a majority of commissioners proposals go forward to the Parliament and Council for consideration. The Commission's civil service is headed by a Secretary General. The position is currently held by Ilze Juhansone. The rules of procedure of the European Commission set out the commission's operation and organisation.

There has been criticism from a number of people that the highly fragmented DG structure wastes a considerable amount of time in turf wars as the different departments and commissioners compete with each other. Furthermore, the DGs can exercise considerable control over a commissioner with the commissioner having little time to learn to assert control over their staff.

According to figures published by the commission, 23,803 persons were employed by the commission as officials and temporary agents in September 2012. In addition to these, 9230 "external staff" (e.g. Contractual agents, detached national experts, young experts, trainees etc.) were employed. The single largest DG is the Directorate-General for Translation, with a 2309-strong staff, while the largest group by nationality is Belgian (18.7%), probably due to a majority (17,664) of staff being based in the country.

=== Press ===
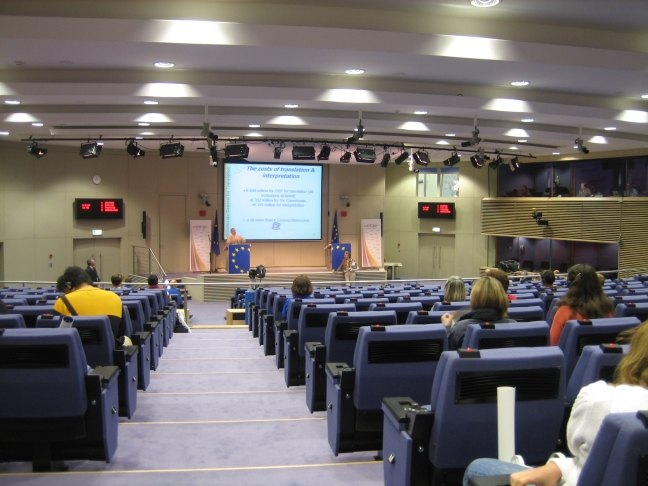
Press Room in the Berlaymont

Communication with the press is handled by the Directorate-General Communication. The Commission's chief spokesperson is Paula Pinho who holds the midday press briefings, commonly known as the "Midday Presser". It takes place every weekday in the Commission's press room at the Berlaymont where journalists may ask questions to the Commission officials on any topic and legitimately expect to get an "on the record" answer for live TV. Such a situation is unique in the world.

As an integral part of the Directorate-General for Communication, the Spokesperson's Service, in coordination with the Executive Communication Adviser in the President's Cabinet, supports the president and commissioners so that they can communicate effectively. On political communication matters, the chief spokesperson reports directly to the president of the European Commission.

It has been noted by one researcher that the press releases issued by the commission are uniquely political. A release often goes through several stages of drafting which emphasises the role of the commission and is used "for justifying the EU and the Commission" increasing their length and complexity. Where there are multiple departments involved a press release can also be a source of competition between areas of the Commission and commissioners themselves. This also leads to an unusually high number of press releases, and is seen as a unique product of the EU's political set-up.

There is a larger press corps in Brussels than Washington, D.C.; in 2020, media outlets in every Union member-state had a Brussels correspondent. Although there has been a worldwide cut in journalists, the considerable press releases and operations such as Europe by Satellite and EuroparlTV leads many news organisations to believe they can cover the EU from these source and news agencies. The Commission shut down Presseurop on 20 December 2013, though the decision was criticised.

== Legitimacy and criticism ==
As the commission is the executive branch, candidates are chosen individually by the 27 national governments. Within the EU, the legitimacy of the commission is mainly drawn from the vote of approval that is required from the European Parliament, along with its power to dismiss the body. Eurosceptics have therefore raised the concern of the relatively low turnout (often less than 50%) in elections for the European Parliament since 1999. While that figure may be higher than that of some national elections, including the off-year elections of the United States Congress, the fact that there are no direct elections for the position of Commission President calls the position's legitimacy into question in the eyes of some Eurosceptics. The fact that the commission can directly decide (albeit with oversight from specially formed "comitology committees") on the shape and character of implementing legislation further raises concerns about democratic legitimacy.

Even though democratic structures and methods are changing there is not such a mirror in creating a European civil society. The Treaty of Lisbon may go some way to resolving the perceived deficit in creating greater democratic controls on the commission, including enshrining the procedure of linking elections to the selection of the Commission president. Historically, the commission had indeed been seen as a technocratic expert body which, akin with institutions such as independent central banks, deals with technical areas of policy and therefore ought to be removed from party politics. From this viewpoint, electoral pressures would undermine the commission's role as an independent regulator. Defenders of the Commission point out that legislation must be approved by the Council in all areas (the ministers of member states) and the European Parliament in most areas before it can be adopted, thus the amount of legislation which is adopted in any one country without the approval of its government is limited.

In 2009 the European ombudsman published statistics of citizens' complaints against EU institutions, with most of them filed against the commission (66%) and concerning lack of transparency (36%). In 2010 the commission was sued for blocking access to documents on EU biofuel policy. This happened after media accused the Commission of blocking scientific evidence against biofuel subsidies. Lack of transparency, unclear lobbyist relations, conflicts of interests and excessive spending of the commission was highlighted in a number of reports by internal and independent auditing organisations. It has also been criticised on IT-related issues, particularly with regard to Microsoft. In September 2020, the European Commission put forward an Anti-Racism Action Plan to tackle the alleged structural racism in the European Union, including measures to address the lack of racial diversity among the European decision makers in Brussels, as denounced by the #BrusselsSoWhite movement.

== Initiatives ==
=== Anti-terrorism ===
The European Commission has an Action Plan to enhance preparedness against chemical, biological, radiological and nuclear (CBRN) security risks as part of its anti-terrorism package released in October 2017. In recent times Europe has seen an increased threat level of CBRN attacks. As such, the European Commission's preparedness plan is important, said Steven Neville Chatfield, a director for the Centre for Emergency Preparedness and Response in the United Kingdom's Health Protection Agency. For the first time, the European Commission proposed that medical preparedness for CBRN attack threats is a high priority. "The European Commission's (EC) Action Plan to enhance preparedness against CBRN security risks is part of its anti-terrorism package released in October 2017, a strategy aimed at better protecting the more than 511 million citizens across the 27 member states of the European Union (EU)."

=== COVID-19 response ===
The European Commission organized a video conference of world leaders on 4 May 2020 to raise funds for COVID-19 vaccine development. US$8 billion was raised.

The European Commission issued a new multi-year data plan in February 2020 pushing the digitalization of all aspects of EU society for the benefit of civic and economic growth.

The goal of this data strategy is to create a single market for data in which data flows across the EU and across sectors while maintaining full respect for privacy and data protection, where access rules are fair, and where the European economy benefits enormously as a global player as a result of the new data economy.

== Location ==
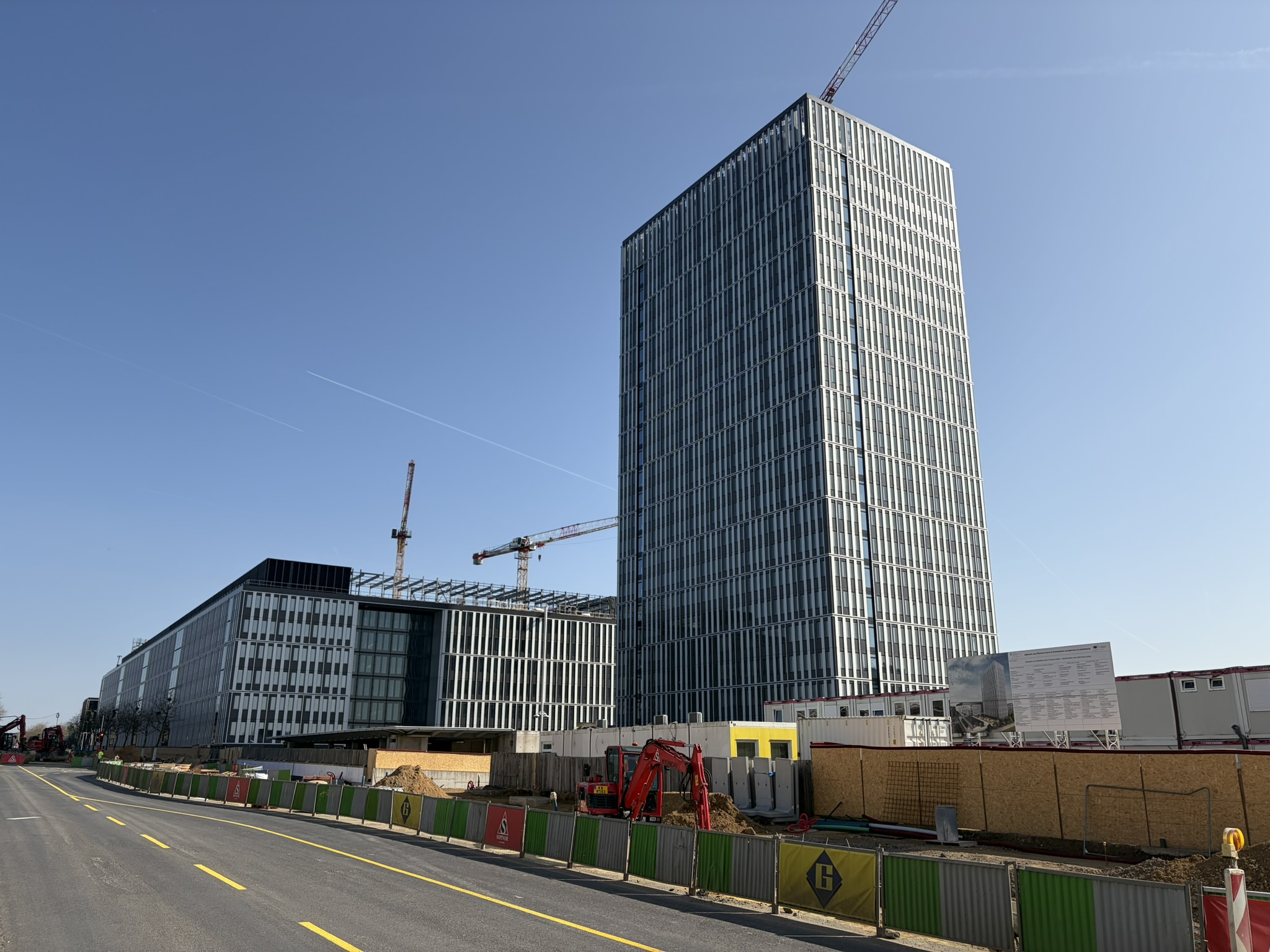
The EU treaties require the Commission to maintain departments in Luxembourg. The Jean Monnet 2 building will become the principal location of the Commission's Luxembourg-based activities.

Under the EU treaties, the Commission's departments are based in Brussels and Luxembourg City. The Commission's principal headquarters is in Brussels, where the Berlaymont building houses the offices of the president, the other members of the Commission and their cabinets, as well as the Commission's principal meeting room on its 13th floor. Brussels is the Commission's main administrative centre, with its departments occupying numerous buildings across the city. Luxembourg is its second main administrative site, with a similar, though smaller, range of Commission departments and facilities, including its main data centres. Together, the Commission has around 70 operational buildings in Brussels and Luxembourg.

When the European Parliament meets in Strasbourg, commissioners also use the Winston Churchill building while attending Parliament's debates.

In addition to its main administrative sites in Brussels and Luxembourg, the Commission operates specialist worksites elsewhere in the European Union. The Commission's Joint Research Centre maintains scientific and technical facilities at Geel in Belgium, Ispra in Italy, Karlsruhe in Germany, Petten in the Netherlands and Seville in Spain. At Grange, County Meath, Ireland, a Commission site houses part of the Directorate-General for Health and Food Safety (DG SANTE).

Separate from these worksites, the Commission maintains representations in the capitals of all 27 EU member states. These offices primarily undertake communication, public outreach and liaison activities rather than serving as the Commission's principal administrative worksites.

== See also ==
- European Free Trade Association Surveillance Authority
- List of European commissioners by member state
- EU Open Data Portal
- European Data Portal
