= Gert Jan Koopman =

Dutch civil servant of the European Union

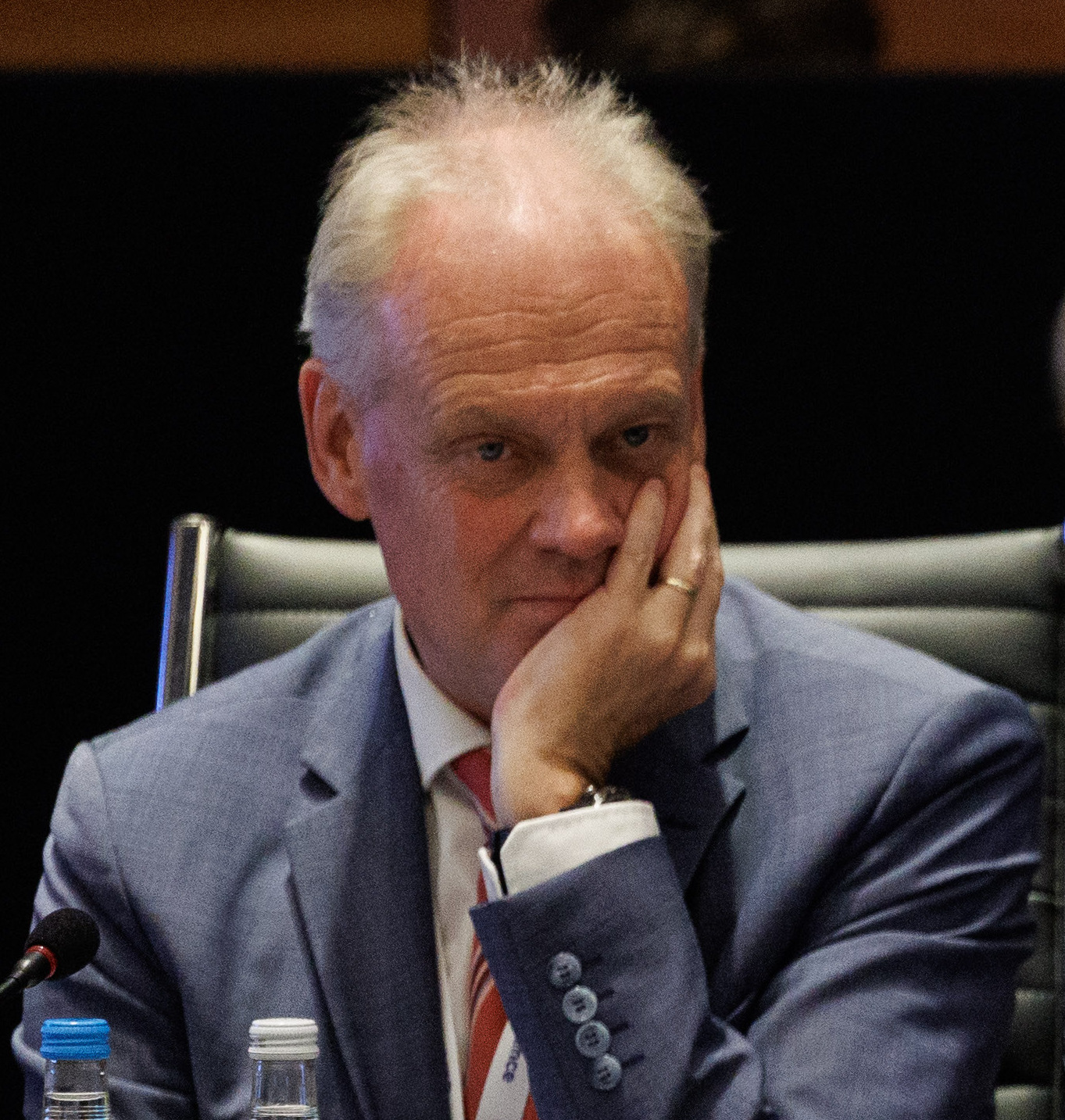
- Koopman in 2023

Director-General for Enlargement and Eastern Neighbourhood
- Incumbent
- Assumed office February 2025
- Commission: von der Leyen II
- Preceded by: Himself (NEAR)

Director-General for Neighbourhood and Enlargement Negotiations
- In office January 2023 – January 2025
- Commission: von der Leyen I and II
- Preceded by: Maciej Popowski
- Succeeded by: Himself (ENEST); Stefano Sannino (MENA)

Director-General for Budget
- In office August 2018 – January 2023
- Commission: Juncker von der Leyen I
- Preceded by: Nadia Calviño
- Succeeded by: Stéphanie Riso

Personal details
- Born: 1966 (age 59–60) Netherlands
- Citizenship: Netherlands
- Education: University of Amsterdam

Gert Jan Koopman (born 1966), also written as Gert-Jan Koopman, is a high-ranking European civil servant from the Netherlands. He is currently the Director General for Neighbourhood and Enlargement Negotiations at the European Commission in Brussels.

== Early life and career ==
Koopman studied economics, Latin and Greek at the University of Amsterdam. He started his career as a lecturer in economics at the Utrecht University. He worked at the CPB Netherlands Bureau for Economic Policy Advice.

== European Commission ==
Koopman joined the European Commission in 1991, as official at the Directorate-General for Economic and Financial Affairs. From 1995 to 2004, Koopman was member and subsequently chief of staff of the European Commissioner Neil Kinnock, responsible for transport policy and later for administrative reform. From 2005 he worked in a director role at the Directorate-General for Internal Market, Industry, Entrepreneurship and SMEs. In 2008 he returned to the Directorate-General for Economic and Financial Affairs. In 2010, he moved to become a deputy Director at the Directorate-General for Competition, where he was in charge of State aid rules. He oversaw the investigations into tax loopholes in the EU. The tax sweetheart deals exposed the continent to the risk a subsidies race, according to Koopman.

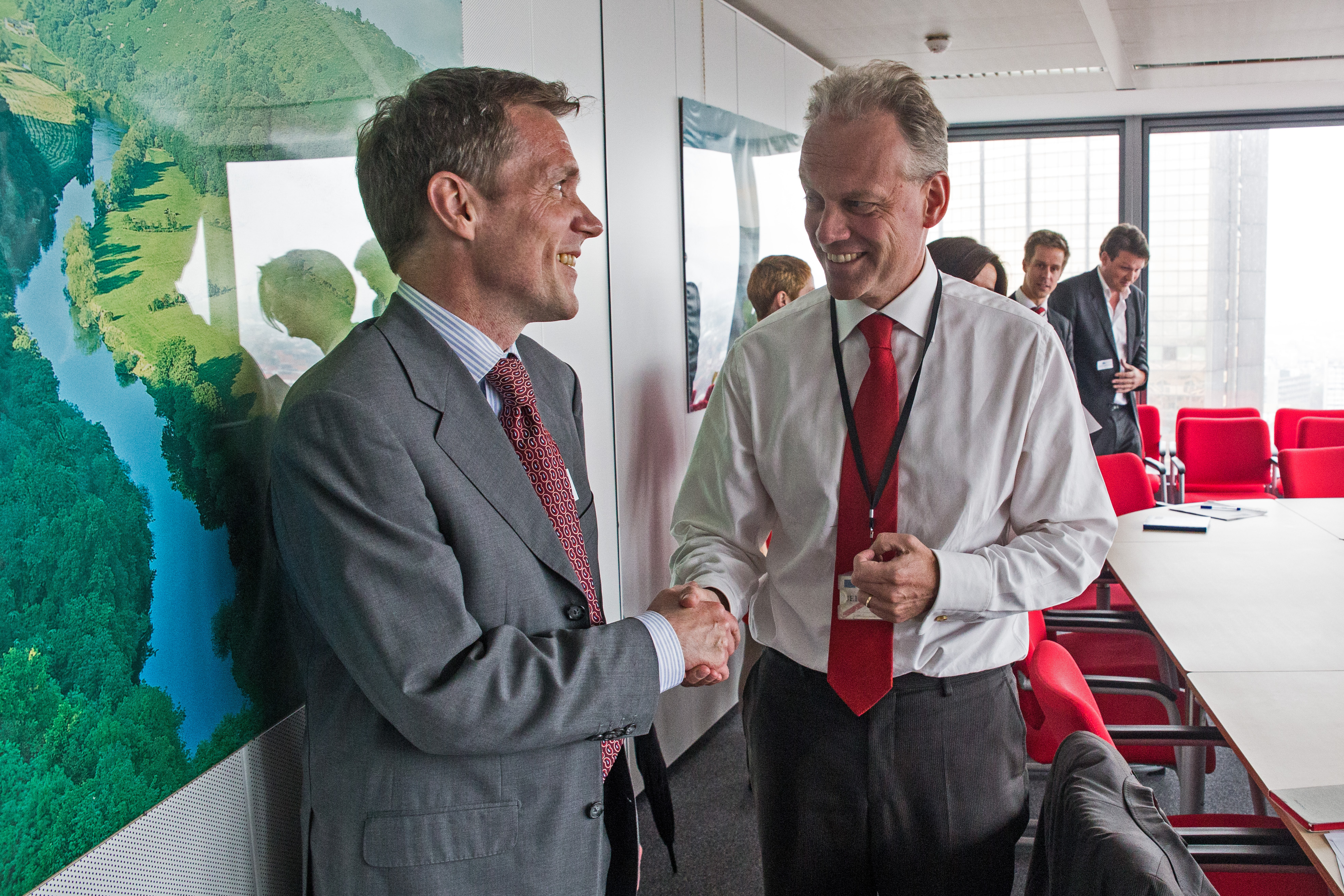
Koopman with Norwegian State Secretary Paal Bjørnestad in 2014 at the Directorate General for Competition in Brussels

Koopman was appointed Director General for Budget in 2018. In this role he was responsible for the design of the €800 billion Next Generation EU recovery plan, aimed at re-establishing ecoonmic growth in the EU after the COVID-19 pandemic.

In 2023, Koopman took the position of Director General for Neighbourhood and Enlargement Negotiations .

Under Koopman’s leadership the Directorate-General for Neighbourhood and Enlargement Negotiations introduced a growth plan for Western Balkans to bring stability to the region. Koopman toured the region to discuss the growth plan with the region’s state representatives.

In his role, Koopman is responsible for negotiations with Ukraine on the accession of the war-torn country to the European Union following the Russian invasion of Ukraine. Koopman has insisted in his discussion with the Ukrainian government on anti-corruption reforms in the country.

== Personal life ==
Koopman lives with his family in Brussels. He owns a luxury resort in Bali, that his family periodically visits. Politico reported on the hotel ownership by Koopman because the outlet considered that it could lead to conflicts of interest for an EU official. The ownership of a hotel does not constitute an activity that warrants disclosure according to the response of the European Commission to Politico.
