= Directorate-General for Enlargement and Eastern Neighbourhood =

European commission department

The Directorate-General for Enlargement and the Eastern Neighbourhood (DG ENEST) is a directorate-general of the European Commission responsible for the European Union's enlargement policy and for its relations with the countries of the Eastern neighbourhood. It began operating on 1 February 2025 and works under the political authority of the European Commissioner for Enlargement, Marta Kos. Its director-general is Gert Jan Koopman.

Alongside its policy role, DG ENEST is one of the commission's larger spending departments, administering the bulk of EU financial and technical assistance to candidate countries, potential candidates and the Eastern neighbourhood. It also hosts the secretariat of the Ukraine Donor Platform and coordinates the commission's work on Ukraine's recovery and reconstruction.

== History ==
DG ENEST was created by splitting its predecessor, the Directorate-General for Neighbourhood and Enlargement Negotiations (DG NEAR), into two departments. Enlargement and the Eastern neighbourhood were assigned to DG ENEST, while the southern neighbourhood and the Gulf passed to the newly created Directorate-General for the Middle East, North Africa and the Gulf (DG MENA). The reorganisation was announced by Commission President Ursula von der Leyen when she presented her second College of Commissioners in September 2024, formalised by Commission decision in December 2024 and took effect on 1 February 2025.

Commentators read the split as an organisational signal that enlargement had been elevated within the commission's priorities for the 2024-2029 mandate, after a decade in which the policy had largely stalled.

== Responsibilities ==
DG ENEST takes forward the Union's enlargement and Eastern Neighbourhood policies in cooperation with the European External Action Service and the commission's thematic departments. It monitors the progress of enlargement countries, supports accession negotiations as mandated by the Council and manages bilateral relations with candidates and potential candidates, concentrating on reforms in the rule of law, economic governance and public administration.

Its remit covers the Western Balkans, Turkey, Ukraine and Moldova, as well as Armenia, Azerbaijan and Belarus. The department is also responsible for communicating the benefits of enlargement both in member states and in partner countries, and for regional cooperation and the "gradual integration" of candidates into EU policies and programmes ahead of formal accession.

== Organisation ==
As of July 2026 the department was organised into five directorates and a strategic coordination unit reporting to the director-general:

- Directorate A – Enlargement coordination, strategy and investments, including strategic programming, international financial institutions and investments, private sector engagement, and the TAIEX and Twinning institution-building instruments
- Directorate B – Western Balkans
- Directorate C – Neighbourhood East and Türkiye
- Directorate D – Ukraine Service, covering reconstruction and accession, economic and sectoral policies, governance and financial assistance, and the secretariat of the Ukraine Donor Platform
- Directorate R – Resources
- Unit ENEST.01 – Strategic coordination and communication

The existence of a standalone Ukraine Service, unusual for a geographic Directorate-General, reflects the scale of the commission's financial and reconstruction engagement in the country. Several units maintain staff in EU Delegations rather than in Brussels.

== Financial instruments ==
DG ENEST administers assistance through the Instrument for Pre-Accession Assistance (IPA III), the Neighbourhood, Development and International Cooperation Instrument (NDICI-Global Europe), the Ukraine Facility and the Reform and Growth Facility for the Western Balkans. It additionally manages three investment frameworks - the European Fund for Sustainable Development Plus (EFSD+), the Western Balkans Investment Framework and the Ukraine Investment Framework - which deliver budgetary guarantees, financial instruments and blending.

Analysts have noted that the department inherited these instruments with separate legal bases and procedural rules and that the resulting fragmentation places a premium on inter-service coordination if programming is to remain strategically coherent.

=== Multiannual Financial Framework 2028-2034 ===
Under the commission's proposal for the Multiannual Financial Framework covering 2028-2034, most of these instruments would be consolidated into a single Global Europe Instrument worth some €200 billion, replacing NDICI, IPA III, the Reform and Growth Facilities for the Western Balkans and Moldova and the Ukraine Facility. Support for Ukraine, of up to €100 billion, would be financed above the MFF ceilings, largely in the form of loans drawn from the budget's headroom.

The proposal has attracted criticism from enlargement specialists. The indicative allocation of roughly €11.7 billion for the Western Balkans represents a substantial nominal increase over IPA III but, once inflation and the earlier Growth Plan grants are taken into account, little or no increase in real terms; the wider European pillar of the instrument has been judged unlikely to match the political prominence given to enlargement.

== Activity ==
DG ENEST prepares the commission's annual enlargement package. The 2025 package, adopted on 4 November 2025, assessed ten partners and identified Montenegro, Albania, Ukraine and Moldova as the strongest performers, indicating that Montenegro might conclude negotiations in 2026 and Albania by the end of 2027, and endorsing Ukraine and Moldova's target of 2028. It also recorded a marked deterioration in Georgia, whose accession process is in practice suspended and continued stagnation in Turkey.

Negotiations accelerated during 2026. An intergovernmental conference in Luxembourg on 15 June 2026 opened the Fundamentals cluster with Ukraine and Moldova, and on 14 July 2026 four accession conferences were held on a single day - the first such concentration in more than two decades - opening the external relations cluster with Ukraine and Moldova while Albania closed its first chapters and Montenegro passed the halfway mark of the thirty-three negotiating chapters.

Member states began preparatory work on an accession treaty for Montenegro in December 2025, the first such exercise since Croatia's accession. Kos has indicated that the Montenegrin treaty is intended as a template for subsequent accessions, incorporating stronger safeguards against post-accession backsliding on the rule of law.

== Assessment ==
The department's principal constraint is institutional rather than technical: opening and closing negotiating clusters requires unanimity in the council, so the commission can prepare files that member states then decline to advance. This gap was visible through 2025 and 2026, when the commission and successive council presidencies pursued a strategy of 'frontloading' - driving technical reform and monitoring as though negotiations were formally under way - in order to preserve momentum while unanimity was out of reach.

A second recurring tension concerns the department's dual role as reform advocate and donor. Assistance to independent media and civil society in politically contested environments can expose recipients to accusations of foreign influence, and the commission's visibility requirements for EU-funded work sit uneasily with the protection of those recipients.

== See also ==
- Enlargement of the European Union
- Directorate-General for the Middle East, North Africa and the Gulf
- European Neighbourhood Policy
- Instrument for Pre-Accession Assistance
- Accession of Ukraine to the European Union
