= Michael Karnitschnig =

European civil servant

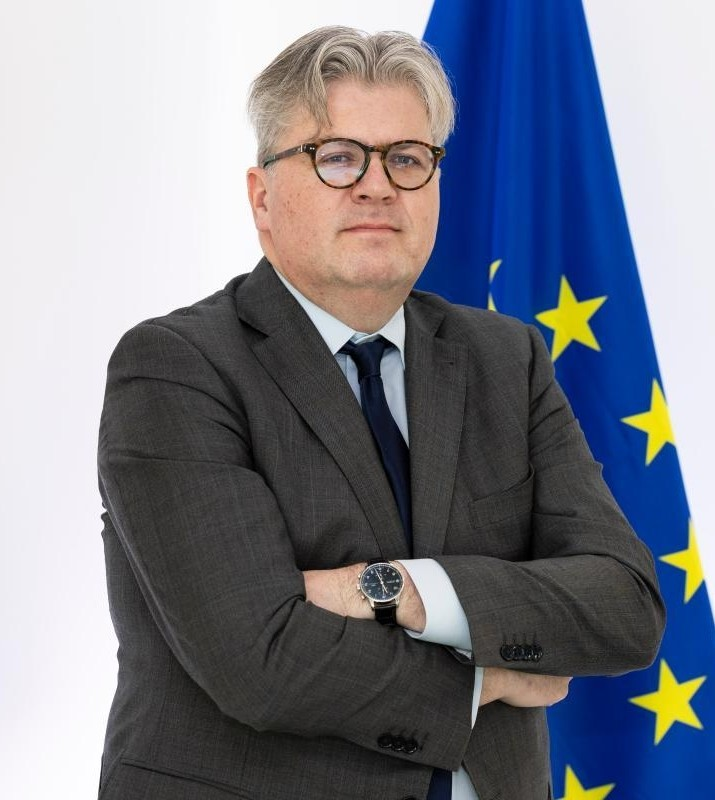
- Karnitschnig in 2026

Acting Director-General for the Middle, North Africa and the Gulf
- Incumbent
- Assumed office January 2026
- Commission: Von der Leyen II
- Preceded by: Stefano Sannino

Deputy Director-General of DG MENA
- Incumbent
- Assumed office July 2025
- Commission: Von der Leyen II
- Director-General: Stefano Sannino

Acting Deputy Director-General of MENA Director for the Gulf
- In office April 2025 – June 2025
- Commission: Von der Leyen II
- Director-General: Stefano Sannino

Director for External Relations of the European Commission
- In office 2019–2025
- Commission: Von der Leyen II
- Secretary-General: Ilze Juhansone
- Preceded by: Ilze Juhansone (acting)
- Succeeded by: Stefano Grassi

Head of Cabinet to Commissioner Hahn
- In office 2014–2019
- Commission: Juncker
- Commissioner: Johannes Hahn

Personal details
- Born: 1974 (age 51–52) Innsbruck, Austria
- Citizenship: Austria
- Education: University of Graz (LLM); College of Europe (MA)
- Occupation: European civil servant

Michael Karnitschnig is a European civil servant of Austrian nationality who has served as acting director-general of the European Commission's Directorate-General for the Middle East, North Africa and the Gulf (DG MENA) since December 2025. He joined the commission in 2000 and has spent most of his career in external relations, including five years as head of cabinet to Enlargement Commissioner Johannes Hahn.

== Early life and education ==
Karnitschnig was born in Innsbruck. He holds a master's degree in law from the University of Graz and the Vrije Universiteit Amsterdam (1996) and a master's degree in political science from the College of Europe in Bruges (1997). Before entering the European institutions he worked at the Austrian Ministry of Defence during his military service (1997–1998) and at the Austrian Ministry for Foreign Affairs (1998–1999).

== Career ==
=== European Commission ===
Karnitschnig joined the European Commission from the Austrian foreign ministry in 2000. He began as a lawyer in the Directorate-General for Agriculture, advising on agricultural trade, and as desk officer for Serbia, Montenegro and Kosovo in the Directorate-General for External Relations.

From 2004 to 2006 he was speechwriter to External Relations Commissioner Benita Ferrero-Waldner, and in 2006–2007 he was seconded to the German Federal Foreign Office as an adviser on the European Neighbourhood Policy during Germany's Council presidency. He returned to Ferrero-Waldner's cabinet from 2007 to 2010 with responsibility for the neighbourhood policy and transatlantic relations and took part in the team preparing the establishment of the European External Action Service.

Karnitschnig served as foreign policy spokesman for Commission President José Manuel Barroso from 2010 to 2011 and then as a member of Barroso's cabinet from 2011 to 2014, advising on enlargement, development and humanitarian affairs and climate and energy. From 2014 to 2019 he was head of cabinet to Johannes Hahn, Commissioner for European Neighbourhood Policy and Enlargement Negotiations.

In July 2019 the College of Commissioners appointed him Director for External Relations in the commission's Secretariat-General.

=== DG MENA ===
Following the creation of DG MENA in February 2025, Karnitschnig became its director for Relations with the Gulf. On 21 May 2025 the commission appointed him Deputy Director-general of the department.

He took over as acting director-general in December 2025, after Stefano Sannino left the post. In that capacity he has represented the Commission at senior official level in the region's donor coordination, co-chairing the senior officials' meeting of the Palestine Donor Group in July 2026 with the Palestinian minister for finance and planning.
