= Moving average rate procedure =

Procedure for currency conversion

The moving average rate procedure is a proven procedure within development cooperation to convert locally used currency of the projects (voucher currency) to the currency used at the head office (company currency). This procedure prevents any profits or losses resulting from fluctuating exchange rates. It allows to fully translate the countervalue of all funds given to the project to costs.

== Background ==
The moving average rate procedure has been developed in the 80s on behalf of the German Federal Ministry of Economic Cooperation and Development (BMZ) to properly account for the funds made available to the public implementing agency GIZ.

By and by, the procedure has been adopted by other aid agencies, and is meanwhile a widespread instrument for exchange rates conversions. Many other donors such as the German Federal Foreign Office, the Worlds Food Programme or the Humanitarian Aid and Civil Protection department of the European Commission (ECHO) also accept the procedure in accounting for their funds.

== Calculation ==
The calculation is based on the total balances in company and voucher currency and the newly received funds. The following formula is used:

$\text{New average rate} = \frac{\text{Total balance in company currency } + \text{new funds in company currency}} {\text{Total balance in voucher currency } + \text{new funds in voucher currency}}$

Example with EUR as company currency
	Voucher currency	Value in (EUR)	Average rate
1. Supply of funds	100.000,00	50.000,00	0,5
Costs	80.000,00	40.000,00	0,5
Total balance	20.000,00	10.000,00	0,5
2. Supply of funds	80.000,00	50.000,00	0,625
Total balance	100.000,00	60.000,00	0,6
Costs	70.000,00	42.000,00	0,6

== Application ==
WINPACCS has the moving average rate procedure inbuilt. Many aid agencies still do this calculation using a spreadsheet.
