= Stefano Grassi =

Italian European Commission official

Director for External Relations, Secretariat-General of the European Commission
- Incumbent
- Assumed office 2025
- Preceded by: Michael Karnitschnig

Personal details
- Born: c. 1970
- Education: Sant'Anna School of Advanced Studies; College of Europe
- Occupation: Civil servant

Stefano Grassi (born c. 1970) is an Italian European civil servant who has served as Director for External Relations in the Secretariat-General of the European Commission since 2025. He has worked at the European Commission since 2004 and has headed the private offices of two Commissioners, serving as head of cabinet to High Representative Federica Mogherini and to Energy Commissioner Kadri Simson.

== Early career ==
Grassi studied at the Sant'Anna School of Advanced Studies in Pisa and at the College of Europe in Bruges. From 2002 to 2004 he worked for the Council of Europe Development Bank.

He joined the European Commission in 2004 as a policy coordinator and held a succession of posts in its Secretariat-General. He contributed to the preparation of Mario Monti's 2010 report on a new strategy for the single market, and later advised two Italian prime ministers: Monti, on European affairs and economic reform, from 2011 to 2013, and Enrico Letta, as EU sherpa and policy adviser, from 2013 to 2014. Before his first cabinet appointment he represented the Commission in the Antici Group, the body that prepares European Council business at diplomatic level.

== Commission cabinets ==
In August 2016 Grassi was named the Italian member of the cabinet of Commission President Jean-Claude Juncker, with responsibility for justice, institutional affairs and the external dimension of migration and asylum policy. He succeeded Carlo Zadra, whose resignation earlier that year had left Italy without a representative in the president's private office.

From 2018 to 2019 he was head of cabinet to Federica Mogherini, high representative and vice-president of the commission.

In November 2019 the incoming energy commissioner, Kadri Simson of Estonia, chose Grassi to head her cabinet, a decision that attracted comment in Estonia because former Estonian commissioners had advised her to appoint a compatriot; Simson cited his experience of commission decision-making and of external relations. He remained in the post until the end of the first von der Leyen Commission in 2024, a period that included the commission's response to the 2022 energy crisis and the development of the EU's external energy relations.

== Secretariat-general ==
Grassi served as acting director for external relations in the commission's secretariat-general before the College of Commissioners formally appointed him to the post on 3 July 2025. The directorate coordinates the commission's external policies and enlargement work and reports to the deputy secretary-general for interinstitutional and external relations.

== Personal life ==
Grassi is married and has two children.
