= European Union Visitors Programme =

- Abbreviation: EUVP
- Formation: 1974
- Type: Public diplomacy programme
- Purpose: Strengthening people-to-people contacts and promoting understanding of the European Union
- Headquarters: Brussels, Belgium
- Region served: Worldwide
- Members: Selected participants (non-EU countries and international organisations)
- Official language: English, French
- Supervising authorities: Vice-President of the European Parliament; Vice-President of the European Commission / High Representative of the Union for Foreign Affairs and Security Policy
- Parent organization: European Parliament; European Commission
- Website: visitors-programme.europa.eu

The European Union Visitors Programme (EUVP) is a public diplomacy initiative of the European Union aimed at strengthening people-to-people contacts and promoting understanding of the EU's institutions, policies, and values. Established in 1974, the programme is jointly managed by the European Parliament and the European Commission. It is widely regarded as one of the European Union's flagship outreach instruments and is distinguished by its highly selective participation process, focusing on individuals occupying or expected to assume influential roles in public, political, and intellectual life.

The programme is overseen by the Vice-President of the European Parliament responsible for the EUVP and by the Vice-President of the European Commission, who also serves as High Representative of the Union for Foreign Affairs and Security Policy.

== Programme ==
Each year, the EUVP invites a limited cohort of carefully selected participants, primarily consisting of emerging and mid-career political leaders, senior policy professionals, and prominent opinion-formers from countries outside the European Union, as well as from international organisations. In cooperation with EU Delegations worldwide, the programme organises study visits designed to deepen mutual understanding, facilitate high-level dialogue, and promote awareness of EU policies and strategic priorities.

Participation in the programme is competitive and based on a rigorous selection process that takes into account candidates’ professional track record, leadership responsibilities, and demonstrated capacity to influence public debate or policy development in their respective countries. Participants are typically drawn from senior or rapidly advancing positions in politics, public administration, academia, media, and civil society.

Study visits are individually tailored and provide participants with access to decision-makers and senior officials, including Members of the European Parliament, high-ranking representatives of EU institutions, and other key stakeholders. The programme combines one-to-one consultations with curated small-group exchanges, often bringing together participants with comparable levels of responsibility or shared areas of strategic interest.

Applicants are generally required to have completed higher education or equivalent training, possess several years of relevant professional experience, and demonstrate a solid understanding of EU institutions and policymaking processes. Proficiency in English or French is required to ensure full and active participation in discussions.

== Alumni ==
The programme maintains an alumni network composed of former participants, many of whom have subsequently held or continue to hold senior leadership positions at the national and international levels. Through sustained engagement with its alumni, the EUVP seeks to cultivate long-term relationships and support a global network of decision-makers and influential actors connected to the European Union.

== See also ==
- International Visitor Leadership Program
- College of Europe
- European University Institute
