= Delegation of the European Union to Albania =

Albania was recognised as a potential candidate country for EU accession in 2003 and officially submitted a membership application in April 2009. Several agreements ensure close collaboration between the EU and Albania. A European partnership with Albania provides support to the Albanian authorities in their quest for EU membership by identifying areas in which further effort and reforms are required.

A Stabilisation and Association Agreement (SAA) entered into force on 1 April 2009, laying out the conditions for membership. Short stays in the EU became easier in 2008 with the entry into force of a visa facilitation agreement.

Albania is a potential candidate country for EU accession following the Thessaloniki European Council of June 2003. On 18 February 2008 the Council adopted a new European partnership with Albania. The Stabilisation and Association Agreement (SAA) with the country was signed on 12 June 2006 and entered into force on 1 April 2009. It supersedes the Interim Agreement on trade and trade-related aspects, which entered into force in December 2006. The EU-Albania visa facilitation agreement entered into force in January 2008 while the readmission agreement entered into force in 2006.

== Timeline ==
Key dates in Albania's path towards the EU include:

Date	Event
1992	Trade and Co-operation Agreement between the EU and Albania. Albania becomes eligible for funding under the EU PHARE programme.
1997	Regional Approach: The EU Council of Ministers establishes political and economic conditionality for the development of bilateral relations.
1999	The EU proposes a new Stabilisation and Association Process (SAP) for five countries of South-Eastern Europe; Albania benefits from Autonomous Trade Preferences with the EU.
2000	Extension of duty-free access to EU market for products from Albania.
June 2000	Feira European Council states that all of the countries under the SAP are "potential candidates" for EU membership
November 2000	Zagreb Summit launched the Stabilisation and Association Process (SAP) for five countries of South-Eastern Europe including Albania.
2001	Start of the Community Assistance for Reconstruction, Development and Stabilisation (CARDS) programme specifically designed for the Stabilisation and Association Process countries. The Commission recommends the undertaking of negotiation on SAA with Albania. The Gothenburg European Council invites the Commission to present draft negotiating directives for the negotiation of a SAA.
October 2002	Negotiating Directives for the negotiation of a SAA with Albania are adopted in October.
January 2003	Commission President Prodi officially launches the negotiations for a SAA between the EU and Albania.
June 2003	At Thessaloniki European Council, the SAP is confirmed as the EU policy for the Western Balkans. The EU perspective for these countries is confirmed (countries participating in the SAP are eligible for EU accession and may join the EU once they are ready).
June 2004	Council decision on a first European Partnership for Albania.
January 2006	Council decision on a revised European Partnership for Albania.
May 2006	Entry into force of the EC-Albania readmission agreement.
June 2006	Signature of the SAA at the General Affairs and External Relations Council in Luxembourg.
December 2006	Entry into force of the Interim Agreement.
January 2007	Entry into force of the new instrument for the Pre-Accession Assistance (IPA).
May 2007	Adoption of the Multi-Annual Indicative Planning Document (MIPD) 2007-2009 for Albania under the IPA.
September 2007	Signature of a visa facilitation agreement between Albania and the EU.
18 October 2007	Albania signs the IPA Framework Agreement.
January 2008	The visa facilitation agreement enters into force.
28 January 2008	Albania and the EC sign the Financing Agreement for the instrument for Pre-Accession Assistance (IPA) 2007 National Programme.
18 February 2008	Council decision on a revised European partnership for Albania.
March 2008	Visa liberalisation dialogue launched.
June 2008	The European Commission presents a road map identifying specific requirements for visa liberalisation with Albania.
1 April 2009	Entry into force of the SAA.
28 April 2009	Albania submits its application for EU membership.
16 November 2009	Council approves Albania's application for EU membership and invites the European Commission to submit an opinion on the application.
9 November 2010	The Commission issues its Opinion on Albania's membership request.
15 December 2010	Visa Liberalisation with Albania enters into force.
