= Directorate-General for the Middle East, North Africa and the Gulf =

European Commission department

The Directorate-General for the Middle East, North Africa and the Gulf (DG MENA) is a directorate-general of the European Commission. Established on 1 February 2025, it serves as the commission's principal point of contact for the countries of the Middle East, North Africa and the Gulf, and is responsible for developing partnerships with them and for deploying the European Union's technical and financial instruments in the region.

DG MENA operates under the political authority of the Commissioner for the Mediterranean, Dubravka Šuica. Its flagship policy framework is the Pact for the Mediterranean, adopted by the College of Commissioners in October 2025 and launched jointly with southern Mediterranean partners in November 2025.

== Background and establishment ==
The creation of a dedicated department for the southern neighbourhood was announced by Commission President Ursula von der Leyen in September 2024, when she presented the composition of her second Commission, which included a Commissioner for the Mediterranean for the first time. The new portfolio reflected the view that partnerships with countries that have no prospect of EU accession require a different framework from that used for candidate countries.

To give effect to this, the commission divided the existing Directorate-General for Neighbourhood and Enlargement Negotiations (DG NEAR) with effect from 1 February 2025. Two departments were created on that date: DG MENA, covering the southern neighbourhood and the Gulf and the Directorate-General for Enlargement and the Eastern Neighbourhood (DG ENEST). The commission justified the split on the grounds that the two regions face distinct challenges and are better served by separate policy tracks.

At its creation DG MENA had a staff of about 500 officials, based in Brussels and in EU delegations in partner countries.

== Remit ==
DG MENA is the commission's entry point for all countries in the three regions within its geographic scope. Its stated purpose is to build partnerships based on mutual interest with the aim of shared sustainable prosperity and resilience, drawing together strands of work from across the commission. Its thematic priorities include economic development and investment, energy, transport and connectivity, security and migration management.

Its geographic remit includes the countries of the EU's southern neighbourhood - Algeria, Egypt, Israel, Jordan, Lebanon, Libya, Morocco, Palestine, Syria and Tunisia - as well as the Gulf states.

== Organisation ==
The directorate-general is headquartered at the Merode building, Avenue de Tervueren 41, in Brussels.

=== Leadership ===
The Italian diplomat Stefano Sannino, previously Secretary-General of the European External Action Service (EEAS), was seconded to the Commission and acted as director-general from February 2025. The commission confirmed his transfer from the EEAS and formally appointed him director-general with effect from 1 July 2025. He left the post at the end of 2025 on planned retirement, and was succeeded in an acting capacity by the deputy director-general, Michael Karnitschnig.

Directors-General
Name	Term	Notes
Stefano Sannino	February 2025 - December 2025	Acting from February 2025; confirmed in post from 1 July 2025
Michael Karnitschnig	December 2025 - present	Acting; previously deputy director-general

== Policy ==
=== Pact for the Mediterranean ===
The Pact for the Mediterranean is DG MENA's principal policy framework. Drawn up by the commission together with the EEAS following a consultation process involving governments, civil society, youth organisations, the private sector and academia, it was adopted by the College of Commissioners in October 2025 and launched with southern Mediterranean partners on 28 November 2025, coinciding with the thirtieth anniversary of the Barcelona Declaration (1995). The pact is organised around three pillars covering people, the economy, and security, crisis response and migration management and sets out the objective of a common Mediterranean space.

A first annual action plan was presented on 17 April 2026, setting out 21 initiatives drawn from more than 100 proposals generated during the consultation. These included a Mediterranean University Initiative and a youth parliamentary assembly under the first pillar. A second edition of the action plan was expected in autumn 2026.

=== Funding ===
The pact was not given dedicated new funding and is instead financed through existing external-action instruments, principally the Neighbourhood, Development and International Cooperation Instrument (NDICI - Global Europe). Implementation is coordinated and monitored by the commission together with the EEAS, with a review by the Foreign Affairs Council every six months on the basis of a report from the Commission and the High Representative.

== Reception ==
Analysts have described the establishment of DG MENA as an attempt by the EU to raise the strategic weight of its engagement with its southern periphery and the Gulf, and to give the region a policy track distinct from enlargement. Commentators have also questioned whether the ambitions of the Pact for the Mediterranean can be met without additional budgetary resources and how its migration and mobility components will interact with the Pact on Migration and Asylum.

== See also ==
- European Neighbourhood Policy
- Union for the Mediterranean
- Euro-Mediterranean Partnership
- Directorate-General for Neighbourhood and Enlargement Negotiations
- European External Action Service
