= Special Accession Programme for Agriculture and Rural Development =

Agriculture assistance program in the European Union

SAPARD (Special Accession Programme for Agriculture and Rural Development) was a financial assistance program established in June 1999 by the Council of the European Union to help countries of Central and Eastern Europe deal with the problems of the structural adjustment in their agricultural sectors and rural areas, as well as in the implementation of the acquis communautaire concerning the Common Agricultural Policy (CAP) and related legislation.

Along with the Instrument for Structural Policies for Pre-Accession (IPSA) and Phare, it was one of the three pre-accession instruments financed by the European Union to assist the applicant countries of Central and Eastern Europe in their preparations for joining the European Union. In 2007 the program was completely replaced by the Instrument for Pre-accession Assistance (IPA).

The programme which came under the remit of the EU Commission's Directorate-General for Agriculture and Rural Development was part of the Agenda 2000 programme for increased pre-accession assistance in 2000–2006. Until the fifth enlargement of the EU in 2004, its overall budget was 560 million euros (2003).

Later, SAPARD funding was available only to Bulgaria, Romania, and Croatia. After Bulgaria and Romania's entry into the EU, Croatia benefited from a specially designed Instrument for Pre-Accession Assistance (IPA), which built on the programme support from Phare, ISPA and SAPARD, it received in 2005–2006.

== See also ==
- Directorate-General for Enlargement (European Commission)
