= Instrument for Pre-Accession Assistance =

EU funding program

The Instrument for Pre-Accession Assistance, or simply IPA, is a funding mechanism of the European Union. As of 2007, it replaced previous programmes such as the PHARE, ISPA, SAPARD and CARDS. Unlike the previous assistance programs, IPA offers funds to both EU candidate countries (Albania, Moldova, Montenegro, North Macedonia, Serbia, Turkey, Ukraine) and potential candidates (Bosnia and Kosovo).

The previous IPA Regulation covering the period 2007-2013 ("IPA I") was replaced in March 2014 by a new regulation ("IPA II") covering the period 2014–2020. The overall budget allocation for IPA II is EUR 11.7bn. The new regulation streamlined the rules governing access to IPA funds for candidate countries and potential candidates.

A third regulation ("IPA III") covering 2021-2027 is currently being negotiated. The current proposal allocates EUR 14.2bn to fund Albania, Bosnia and Herzegovina, Kosovo, Montenegro, North Macedonia, Serbia and Turkey.

Budgets (in millions of euros)
Country	IPA I	IPA II	Total
Turkey	4,795	4,454	9,249
Multi-country	1,137	2,959	4,096
Serbia	1,386	1,508	2,894
Kosovo	656	646	1,302
North Macedonia	615	664	1,279
Albania	595	649	1,244
Croatia	998	0	998
Bosnia and Herzegovina	656	166	822
Montenegro	236	271	507
Iceland	30	0	30

- IPA I
- IPA II

== See also ==
- Future enlargement of the European Union
