= Maciej Popowski =

Polish diplomat

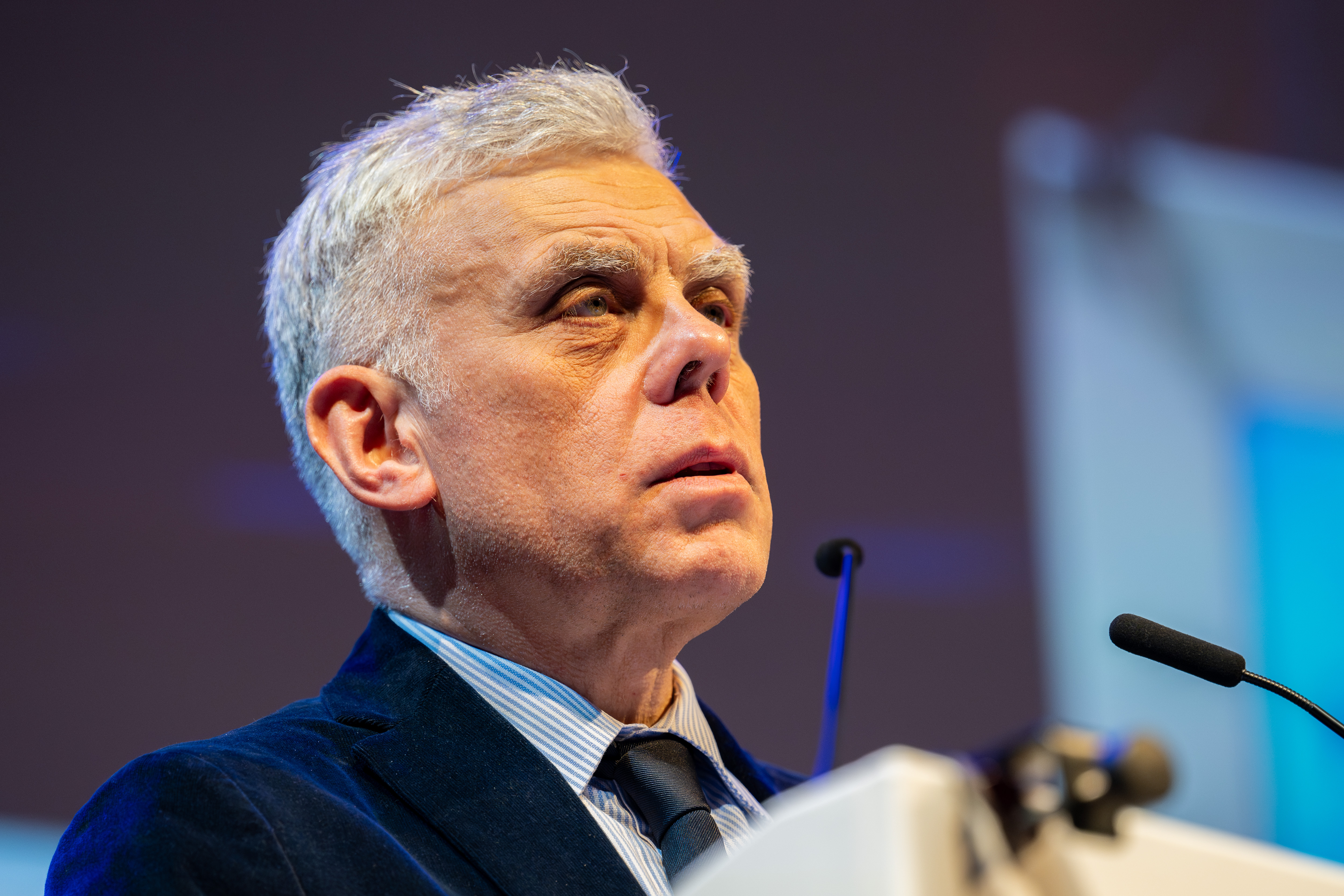

DG ECHO Director-General
- Incumbent
- Assumed office 2023

Personal details
- Born: 25 November 1964 (age 61)
- Education: University of Wrocław
- Profession: Diplomat

Maciej Popowski (born 25 November 1964) is a Polish diplomat and official, and Director-General of the Directorate-General for European Civil Protection & Humanitarian Aid Operations.

== Life ==
In 1988, Maciej Popowski earned his master's degree in German and Dutch language and literature at the University of Wrocław. He has been educated also at the University of Siegen (1989–1990; DAAD scholarship), Polish Institute of International Affairs (1991), and Akademie Auswärtiger Dienst in Bonn (1991–1992).

Between 1988 and 1991 he was working at the University of Wrocław. In 1991, he joined the Ministry of Foreign Affairs. In 1993, he moved to Brussels to work at the Mission of Poland to the European Union at the rank of Second Secretary (1993–1995), First Secretary (1995–1998) and Counsellor (1998–1999). Then, from 2000 he was Deputy Director, and from 2001 Director of the MFA Department of the European Union. He was responsible for relations with the EU Member States and European institutions, accession negotiations, Intergovernmental Conference 2000, Common Foreign and Security Policy. In 2001, he returned to the Mission in Brussels to where he was Deputy Head in charge of accession negotiations (focal point for the European Commission and the Permanent Representations of Member States), European Convention and Intergovernmental Conference 2004 (contact point), implementation of the Association Agreement (secretary of the Association Council), preparation of the transition of the mission into a permanent representation, management of the mission (including personnel and administration). Since 2003 he was Deputy Head of Mission – Ambassador, Representative of Poland to the Political and Security Committee.

In 2008, Popowski joined the European institutions. He became Director in the Directorate-General for Development, European Commission, being responsible for Policy Coherence for Development, aid effectiveness, aid financing, relations with other donors, public communication. Following year, he was promoted Head of Cabinet of the President of the European Parliament Jerzy Buzek. Between 2011 and 2015 he was Deputy Secretary-General of the European External Action Service. Among his chief responsibilities were Common Security and Defence Policy, security policy and conflict prevention, development policy, human rights and democracy, relations with European Parliament. Since 16 April 2016, he is Deputy Director-General at the Directorate-General for European Neighbourhood Policy and Enlargement Negotiations (DG NEAR). On 16 September 2020, he became DG NEAR Acting Director-General. As of 1 March 2023, he serves as DG ECHO Director-General.

Beside Polish, German, Dutch, he speaks English, French, Russian.

== Honours ==
- 2005 – Silver Cross of Merit
- 2012 – Officer's Cross of the Order of Polonia Restituta
- 2022 – Ukrainian Order of Merit, Third Class
