= Helga Schmid =

German diplomat

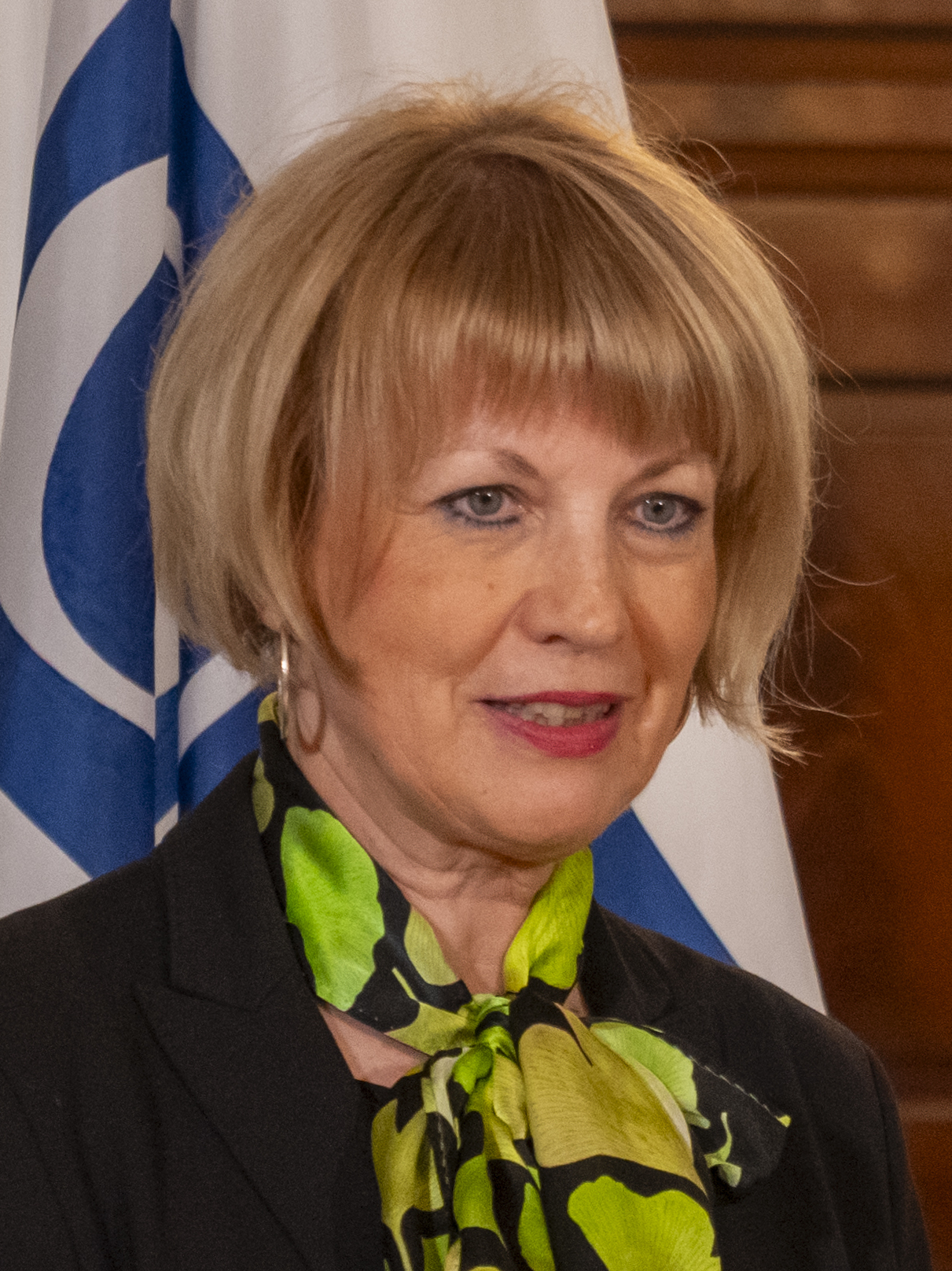
- Schmid in 2023

Secretary General of the Organization for Security and Co-operation in Europe
- In office 4 December 2020 – 6 December 2024
- Preceded by: Thomas Greminger
- Succeeded by: Feridun Sinirlioğlu

Secretary General of the European External Action Service
- In office 1 September 2016 – 1 November 2019
- President: Federica Mogherini
- Preceded by: Alain Le Roy
- Succeeded by: Stefano Sannino

Personal details
- Born: Helga Maria Schmid; 8 December 1960 (age 65) Dachau, West Germany (now Germany)
- Education: LMU Munich; Diplomatic Academy of Vienna

Helga Maria Schmid (born 8 December 1960) is a German diplomat who served as the Secretary General of the Organization for Security and Co-operation in Europe (OSCE) from 2020 to 2024. Prior to her term with the OSCE, Schmid was the Secretary General of the European External Action Service (EEAS) 2016 to 2020.

In July 2024, Schmid was nominated to become President of the United Nations General Assembly starting in September 2025. In 2025, her nomination was withdrawn by Germany in favour of Annalena Baerbock.

== Education ==
Schmid has advanced degrees in literature, History and Politics from LMU Munich. She also studied International and European Union law, Economics and International relations at the Diplomatic Academy of Vienna.

== Career ==
From 1988 Schmid worked in various positions within the German Federal Foreign Office and was assistant private secretary to the minister for European Affairs between 1990 and 1991. From 1991 to 1994 she was the press and public affairs officer for the German embassy in Washington, D.C., under successive ambassadors Jürgen Ruhfus and Immo Stabreit. From 1994 to 1998, Schmid worked as a political adviser to Foreign Minister Klaus Kinkel. She held the same position from 1998 to 2000 with Foreign Minister Joschka Fischer. Between 2000 and 2005, she followed various executive positions at the headquarters of the Foreign Office in Berlin. Among them, she was Head of the Political Staff and Head of the Ministerial Office from 2003 to 2005.

In 2006, Schmid became Director of the Policy Planning and Early Warning Unit of the High Representative for Common Foreign and Security Policy, Javier Solana, in the General Secretariat of the Council of the European Union in Brussels.

Following the founding of the European External Action Service, Schmid became deputy secretary-general for political affairs in 2010, serving under the secretary general Pierre Vimont. In this capacity, she was involved in negotiations for the Nuclear program of Iran. The task was to negotiate with Abbas Araghchi and continue the high level discussions, while the technical level was ongoing. In the negotiations for the EU-3 nuclear agreement with Iran, Schmid was the lead author of the 100-page treaty which was successfully concluded in 2015, while holding the consent of current president Rouhani, who at the time was the Iranian Chief Negotiator in the Nuclear Dispute.

In September 2020, on the recommendation of Heiko Maas, Schmid was nominated by the German government of Chancellor Angela Merkel as a candidate to become secretary-general of the Organization for Security and Co-operation in Europe (OSCE). On 4 December 2020, she was formally appointed to the position.

In 2024 Schmid was the leading candidate to run for president of the United Nations General Assembly in 2025. On 18 March 2025, after the 2025 German federal election, Annalena Baerbock was surprisingly announced to run for the position. Despite this, Schmid received seven votes in the UNGA as a write-in candidate.

On 14 September 2026, Helga Maria Schmid and Jens Stoltenberg were announced as the incoming Co-Chairs of the Munich Security Conference beginning with the MSC 2027.

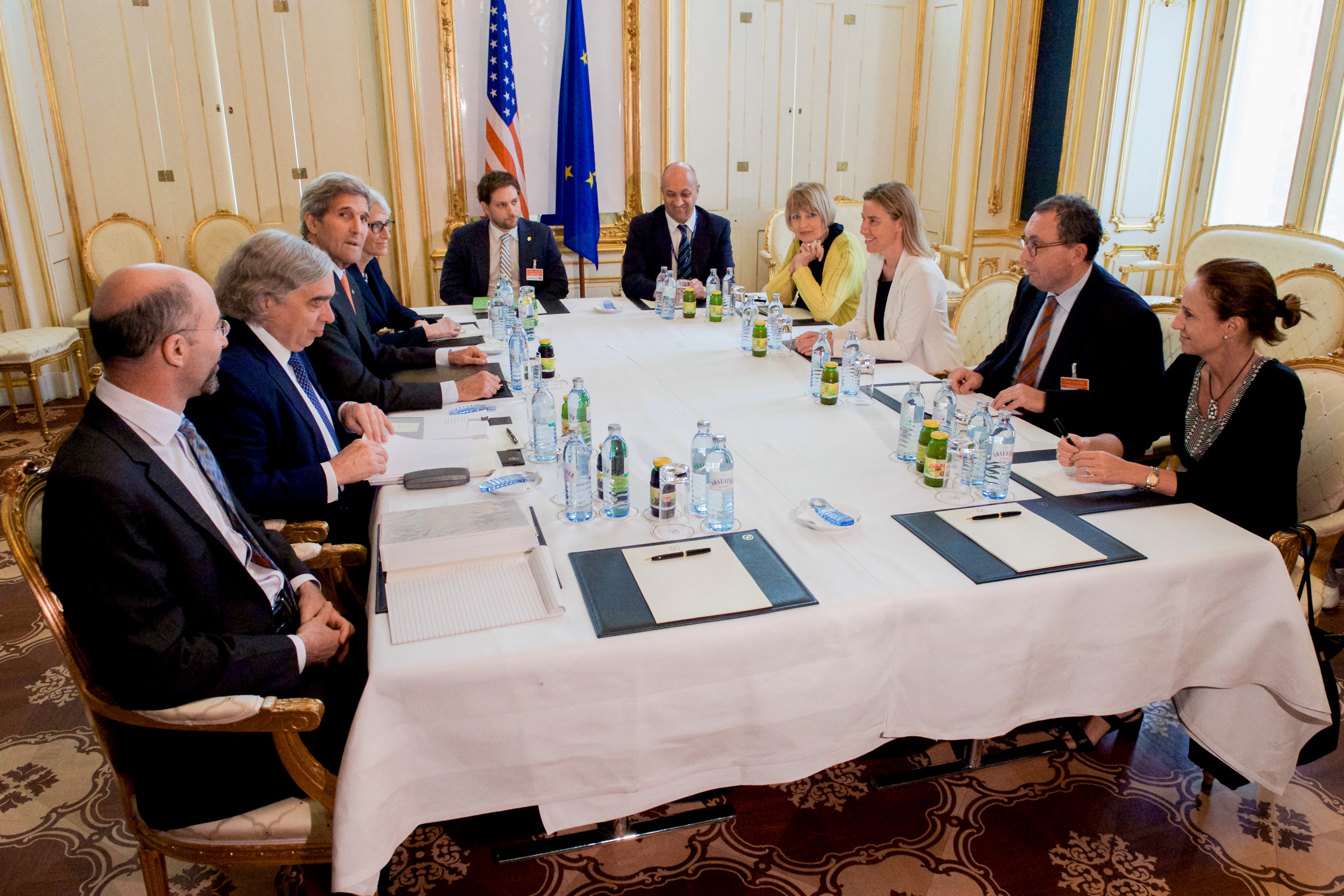
Exchange of notes during the negotiations over the future of Iran's nuclear program in 2015

== Other activities ==
- Center for International Peace Operations (ZIF), Member of the International Advisory Board

== Recognition ==
In 2009, Schmid received the Medal for outstanding service to Bavaria in a united Europe. In November 2015, Foreign Minister Frank-Walter Steinmeier awarded her the Federal Cross of Merit class I.

== Quotes ==
- "Women are the better negotiators."
- "When it comes to the solution to the Syria crisis, the EU position is clear: a lasting solution to the conflict can only be achieved through a Syrian-led political process leading to a transition. Which means obviously that you also talk to the representatives of the Assad regime."
