= Instrument for Structural Policies for Pre-Accession =

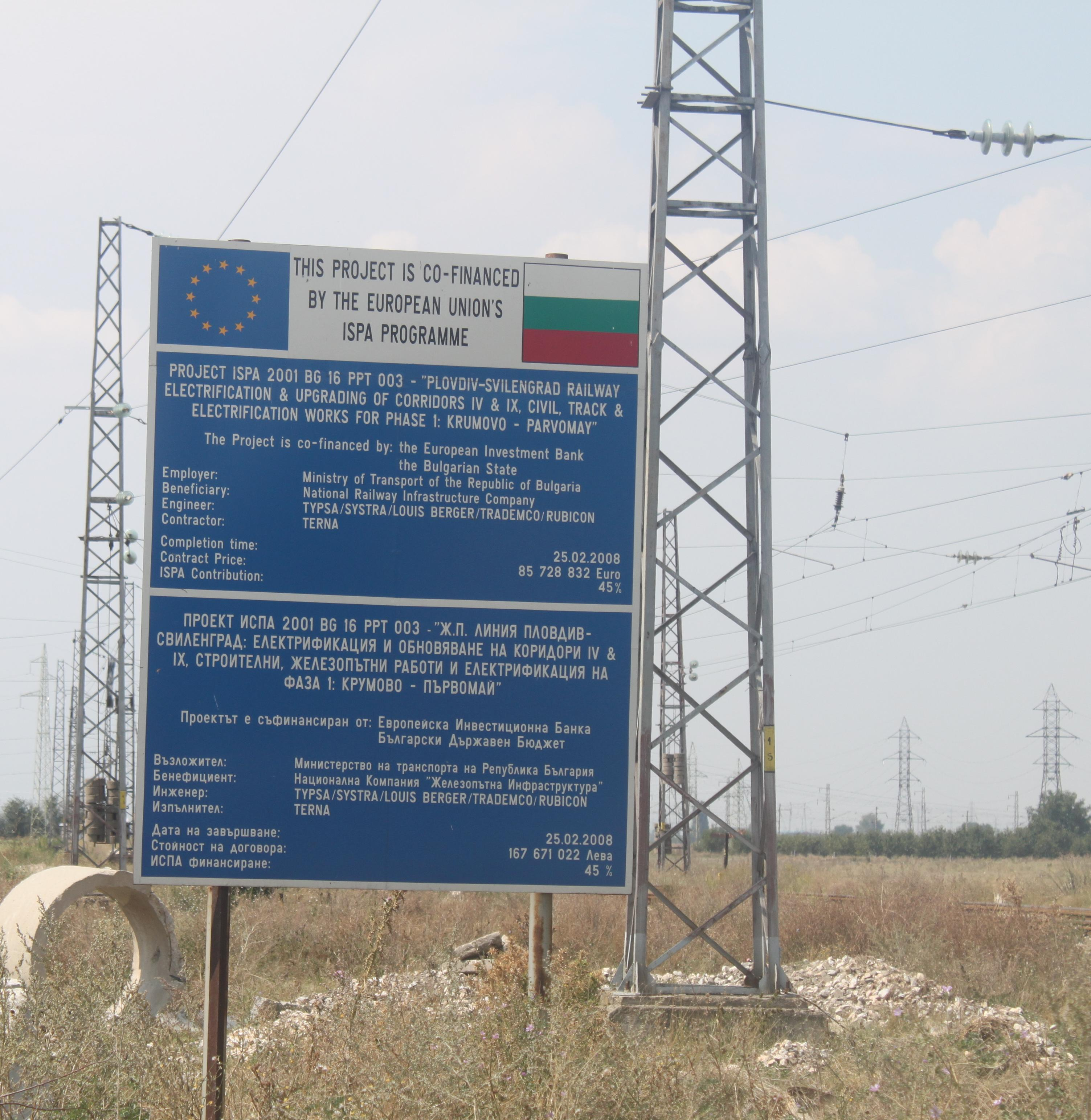
ISPA support in Bulgaria. Electrification of a railroad.

Instrument for Structural Policies for Pre-Accession (ISPA) is one of the three financial instruments of the European Union (along with Phare and SAPARD) to assist the candidate countries in the preparation for accession. It provides assistance for infrastructure projects in the EU priority fields of environment and transport.

For the period 2000–2006, EUR 1,040 million a year (at 1999 prices) has been made available for this instrument. During its first four years of implementation (2000–2003), ISPA grant-aided over 300 large-scale infrastructure investments in the 10 candidate countries of Central and Eastern Europe (Bulgaria, Czech Republic, Estonia, Hungary, Latvia, Lithuania, Poland, Romania, Slovakia, Slovenia). Assistance amounted to EUR 7 billion for an investment value of over EUR 11.6 billion (current prices). After the EU enlargement in 2004, the remaining ISPA beneficiary countries were Bulgaria and Romania, the other beneficiary countries having become eligible to the Cohesion Fund. Since 1 January 2005 Croatia benefits from ISPA as well.

In 2007, ISPA was replaced by the Instrument for Pre-Accession Assistance.

== See also ==
- Directorate-General for Enlargement (European Commission)
