= Accreditations and responsibilities of EU delegations =

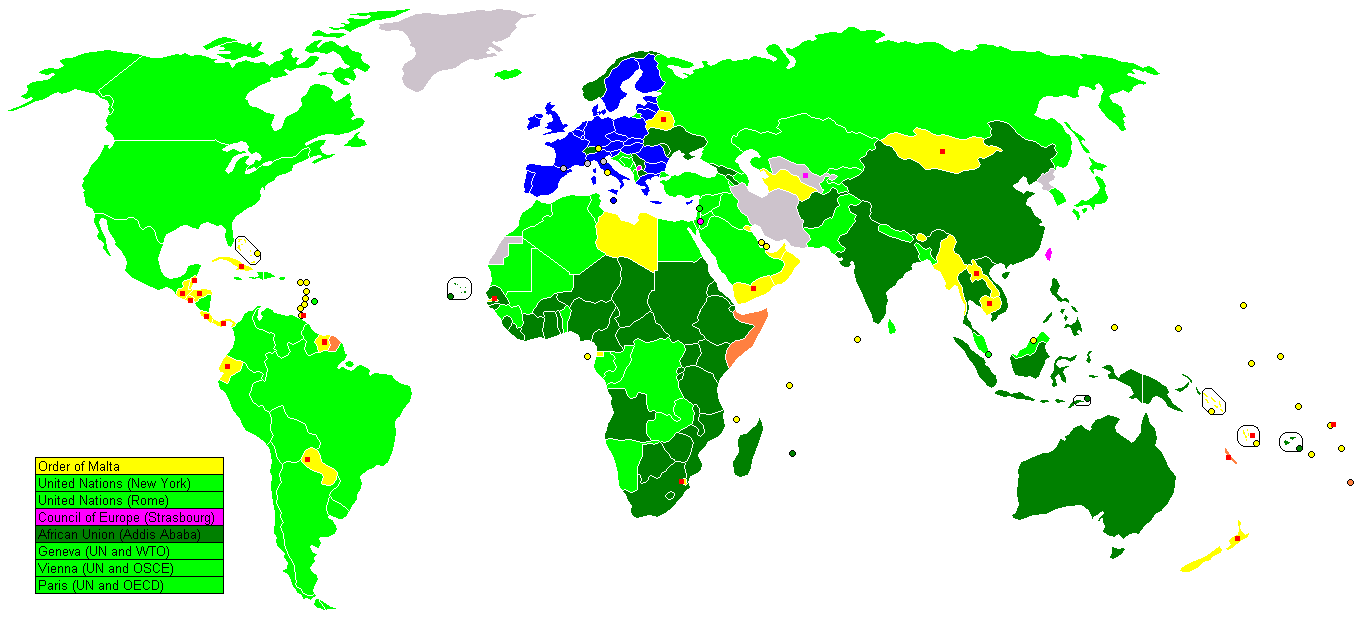
Map of European Union diplomatic missions: European Union member states European Union delegation, full Lisbon duties assumed European Commission delegation duties only ██ Accreditation from non-resident delegation with local office Accreditation from non-resident delegation, no local office European Union non-diplomatic mission only non-diplomatically responsible non-resident delegation no European Union mission, accreditation or responsibility assigned

The European Union maintains delegations with the rank of embassy in many third countries, but there are delegations that are accredited to more than one foreign state. In some cases the accreditation country also hosts a consulate rank EU diplomatic office.

== Accreditations ==
Similarly to ambassadors there are heads of delegations accredited to additional countries, besides their country of residence. Countries with accredited head of delegation resident elsewhere, that are hosts to an office subordinate to another delegation are marked with *.

- Liechtenstein (from Switzerland delegation)
- Holy See (from the delegation to the UN organisations in Rome)
- San Marino (from the delegation to the UN organisations in Rome)
- Sovereign Military Order of Malta (from the delegation to the UN organisations in Rome)
- Bhutan (from India delegation)
- Brunei (from Indonesia delegation)
- Equatorial Guinea (from Gabon delegation)
- São Tomé and Príncipe (from Gabon delegation)
- Maldives (from Sri Lanka delegation)
- Comoros (from Mauritius delegation)
- Seychelles (from Mauritius delegation)
- Oman (from Saudi Arabia delegation)
- Bahrain (from Saudi Arabia delegation)
- Suriname* (from Guyana delegation)
- Antigua and Barbuda (from Barbados delegation)
- Dominica (from Barbados delegation)
- Grenada (from Barbados delegation)
- Saint Lucia (from Barbados delegation)
- Saint Kitts and Nevis (from Barbados delegation)
- Saint Vincent and the Grenadines (from Barbados delegation)
- Tonga (from Fiji delegation)
- Kiribati (from Fiji delegation)
- Tuvalu (from Fiji delegation)
- Micronesia, Federated States of (from Fiji delegation)
- Nauru (from Fiji delegation)
- Palau (from Fiji delegation)
- Marshall Islands (from Fiji delegation)
- Niue (NZ associated state) (from Fiji delegation)

== Responsibilities ==
Some delegations are responsible for European Union activities and relations with third countries that have not established diplomatic relations with the EU and for special territories of EU member states, including some that are part of the EU itself (OMR). Territories that host office subordinate to such delegation are marked with *.

- Cook Islands (NZ associated state) (Fiji delegation)
- Cayman Islands (UK OCT) (Jamaica delegation)
- Turks and Caicos Islands (UK OCT) (Jamaica delegation)
- Aruba (Netherlands OCT) (Guyana delegation)
- Netherlands Antilles (Netherlands OCT) (Guyana delegation)
- Anguilla (UK OCT) (Barbados delegation)
- Montserrat (UK OCT) (Barbados delegation)
- British Virgin Islands (UK OCT) (Barbados delegation)
- French Guiana (France OMR) (Barbados delegation)
- Guadeloupe (France OMR) (Barbados delegation)
- Martinique (France OMR) (Barbados delegation)
- Mayotte (France OCT) (Mauritius delegation)
- Réunion (France OMR) (Mauritius delegation)
- New Caledonia (France OCT)* (Fiji delegation)
- Wallis and Futuna (France OCT) (Fiji delegation)
- French Polynesia (France OCT) (Fiji delegation)
- Pitcairn (UK OCT) (Fiji delegation)

== See also ==
- List of diplomatic missions of the European Union
- Ambassadors of the European Union
- List of diplomatic missions to the European Union
- Foreign relations of the European Union
- European External Action Service
