= Raúl Fuentes Milani =

Spanish diplomat (born 1964)

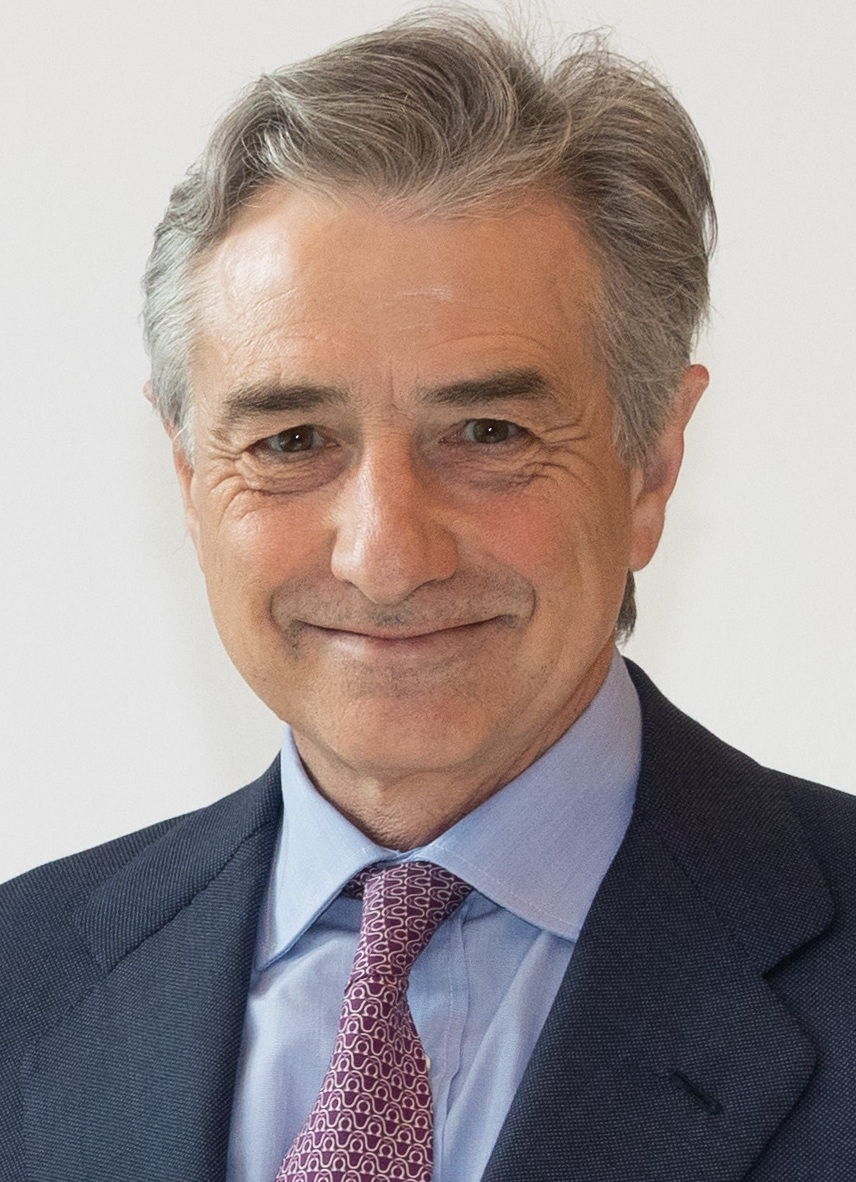
- Fuentes Milani in 2023

European Union Ambassador to the Dominican Republic
- Incumbent
- Assumed office 19 November 2025
- Preceded by: Katja Afheldt

Ambassador-at-large for Global Health
- In office 28 May 2025 – 3 September 2025
- Preceded by: Borja Cabezón Royo
- Succeeded by: Mencía de Silos Manso de Zúñiga Spottorno

Deputy Permanent Representative of Spain to the European Union
- In office 12 February 2020 – 3 July 2024
- Preceded by: Juan de Arístegui Laborde
- Succeeded by: Oriol Escalas Nolla
Other posts
European Union Ambassador to Namibia
In office 2010–2015
Preceded by	Elisabeth Pape
Succeeded by	Jana Hybášková

Personal details
- Born: Raúl Santiago Fuentes Milani; 28 November 1964 (age 61) Salamanca, Castile and León, Spain
- Spouse: Belén Martínez Carbonell
- Education: University of Salamanca

Raúl Fuentes Milani (born 28 November 1964) is a Spanish diplomat serving as ambassador of the European Union to the Dominican Republic since 2025.

== Biography ==
Born in 1964, Fuentes holds a degree in law from the University of Salamanca and joined the diplomatic career in 1991. In his early years, he served as Deputy Director-General for Central and Southern Europe and as Deputy Director-General for General Affairs of the European Union. Abroad, Fuentes has been posted to the Spanish Embassies in Angola—as second chief of mission—, Colombia and Israel and, on several occasions, to the Spanish Representation to the European Union.

As a member of the European External Action Service, he served as European Ambassador to Namibia from 2011 to 2015 and as Head of Division for Israel, the Occupied Palestinian Territories and the Middle East Peace Process. He also served as Head of the Task Force Latin America and UN, in the Policy Unit of the Council Secretariat. From this post he contributed to the EU-LAC Summit of 2010.

In May 2018, he was appointed Deputy Director-General for Institutional Relations within the Directorate-General for Integration and Coordination of General Affairs of the European Union of the Secretariat of State for the European Union. In this position, he was part of the Brexit negotiating team.

In February 2020, the Council of Ministers appointed him as Deputy Ambassador Permanent Representative of Spain to the European Union. During this period, he assisted Ambassador Marcos Alonso in the coordination of the 2023 Spanish Presidency of the Council of the European Union, chairing COREPER I and coordinating the relations with the European Parliament.

In May 2025, he was appointed ambassador-at-large for Global Health, responsible for representing and coordinating Spanish position in global health forums such as the World Health Organization or COVAX, among others. His appointment caused bewilderment in the diplomatic career, since he had already been nominated as European ambassador to the Dominican Republic and could only hold the position until September.

As expected, in September 2025 he left the post after being appointed ambassador of the European Union to the Dominican Republic, presenting his credentials to President Abinader on 19 November 2025.

== Personal life ==
He is married to fellow diplomat Belén Martínez Carbonell, current Secretary-General of the European External Action Service (EEAS).
