= Belén Martínez Carbonell =

Spanish diplomat (born 1969)

- Carbonell in 2026
- Born: 1969 (age 56–57); Ourense, Spain
- Occupation: Ambassador of the European Union to Mexico
- Known for: Secretary General of the European External Action Service (2025–2026)
- Spouse: Raúl Fuentes Milani

Belén Martínez Carbonell (born 1969, Ourense) is a Spanish EU civil servant. She is the current Ambassador of the European Union to Mexico after serving as Secretary-General of the European External Action Service (EEAS), succeeding Stefano Sannino.

She studied in the Concepción Arenal school in Ourense. in 1992 she obtained a Master in Political Science at the Universidad Complutense in Madrid. She got a Master from the CERIS-ULB Diplomatic School of the Université libre de Bruxelles and obtained a master's degree in Advance European Political Studies at the College of Europe. Martínez Carbonell's career in EU diplomacy began in 1994 when she joined the European Commission. She has held various roles in the EEAS and the European Commission, contributing to her experience in global affairs and multilateral relations. From 2003 to 2005 she worked in the EU delegation to the United States. From 2005 to 2010 she was member of the Cabinet of Benita Ferrero-Waldner, European Commissioner for External Relations and European Neighbourhood Policy from 2004 to 2009, and as the European Commissioner for Trade and European Neighbourhood Policy from 2009 to 2010.

In 2010 she joined the EEAS, serving in different positions until 2018, when she was appointed Director of Human Resources and in 2021 Managing Director for Global Affairs.
