= Community Assistance for Reconstruction, Development, and Stabilisation =

EU's financial assistance program to the Western Balkans

The CARDS programme, of Community Assistance for Reconstruction, Development and Stabilisation, is the EU's main instrument of financial assistance to the Western Balkans, covering specifically the countries of Croatia, Bosnia and Herzegovina, Serbia, Montenegro, North Macedonia, Kosovo and Albania. It was created in 2000 by Council Regulation 2666/2000. However it was only in 2001 that the programme became operative under its own regulations, as in the first period it supported projects previously funded by the PHARE and OBNOVA programmes. The programme is the main financial instrument of EU's Stabilisation and Association process (SAp). A total of €5.13 billion is secured for all CARDS actions during 2000-2006, as after that day it will be replaced by the Instrument for Pre-Accession Assistance (IPA), which will cover both candidate and potential candidate countries.

== Objectives ==
The main aim of the programme as its name implies is to support reconstruction, development and stabilization. However, after an early focus on post-war and post-communist reconstruction much of the programme's attention has shifted to institution building projects. Its specified objectives are:

- reconstruction, democratic stabilisation, reconciliation and the return of refugees
- institutional and legislative development, including harmonisation with European Union norms and approaches, to underpin democracy and the rule of law, human rights, civil society and the media, and the operation of a free market economy
- sustainable economic and social development, including structural reform
- promotion of closer relations and regional cooperation among countries and between them, the EU and the candidate countries of central Europe.

== Management of the Programme ==
The responsibility for the programme has been transferred in 2005 from the External Relations to the Enlargement Directorate General. It has a dual management system as the part of the programme covering Serbia, Montenegro and Macedonia is operated by the Thessaloniki based European Agency for Reconstruction (EAR) while the rest of support follows a deconcentrated system as it is managed by the Commission's delegations to Croatia, Bosnia and Herzegovina and Albania. The programme also has a regional component absorbing a 10% of total support, a rather innovative characteristic in comparison with past aid programmes, that underlines EU's emphasis on regional cooperation in the Western Balkans. Two major CARDS evaluations have been undertaken covering both parts of the programme namely the part under the CARDS regulation (Council Regulation 2666/2000) and the part under the EAR regulation (Council Regulation 2667/2000), which also suggested about the future of the Agency.

For each country a strategic framework is prepared in the Country Strategy Paper and Multiannual Indicative Programmes and annual action plans constitute the basis of programming. After the 2003 European Council of Thessaloniki and the approval of the "Thessaloniki agenda" with measures inspired from pre-accession "European Partnerships" were created with each country that constitute the foundation for the CARDS assistance. The programming period formally ends in 2006, but projects from the backlog of CARDS will probably continue to be funded in the new budgetary period (2007-2013) approximately until 2008.
