= Directorate-General for Neighbourhood and Enlargement Negotiations =

European Union department

The Directorate-General for Neighbourhood and Enlargement Negotiations (DG NEAR) was a Directorate-General of the European Commission operational until 1 February 2025. The Directorate-General for the Middle East, North Africa and the Gulf (DG MENA) and the Directorate-General for Enlargement and Eastern Neighbourhood (DG ENEST) have taken over its responsibilities.

The body was responsible for the enlargement process of the European Union and for the European Neighbourhood Policy. The European Union over the years has expanded to 27 members from the first six Member States who signed the Treaty of Rome.

The current Director-General for Enlargement and Eastern Neighbourhood is Gert Jan Koopman, the former Director-General for Budget. The Directorate-General is organised into five Directorates, plus the Support Group for Ukraine (SGUA).

- Directorate A: Thematic support, coordination of policy and financial instruments
- Directorate B: Neighbourhood South and Turkey
- Directorate C: Neighbourhood East and Institution Building
- Directorate D: Western Balkans
- Directorate E: Ukraine Service
- Directorate R: Resources

== See also ==
- European Commissioner for Neighbourhood and Enlargement
- European Neighbourhood Policy
- Stabilisation and Association Process
- Instrument for Structural Policies for Pre-Accession (ISPRA)
- Phare
- Special Accession Programme for Agriculture and Rural Development (SAPARD)
- Statistics relating to enlargement of the European Union
- European Agency for Reconstruction
