= Directorate-General for European Civil Protection and Humanitarian Aid Operations =

European Commission department

The Directorate-General for European Civil Protection and Humanitarian Aid Operations (DG ECHO), formerly known as the European Community Humanitarian Aid Office, is the European Commission's department for overseas humanitarian aid and for civil protection. It aims to save and preserve life, prevent and alleviate human suffering and safeguard the integrity and dignity of populations affected by natural disasters and man-made crises. Since December 2024, Hadja Lahbib is serving as Commissioner for Preparedness, Crisis Management and Equality in the Von der Leyen Commission, and since 1 March 2023, Maciej Popowski leads the organisation as the Director-General.

The EU budget of the department as programmed in the EU's Multi-annual Financial Framework (MFF) 2021–2027 amounts to a total of €9.76 billion for the entire seven years. For 2021, the European Commission has adopted its initial annual humanitarian budget of €1.4 billion. Together with its Member States, DG ECHO is a leading humanitarian donor, allocating funding to millions of crisis-affected people in more than 80 countries.

For its humanitarian interventions, DG ECHO usually funds operations through a wide range of around 200 partners (NGOs, UN agencies, and international organisations such as the International Red Cross and Red Crescent Movement. DG ECHO has a strong presence in the field, with a network of some 450 staff in over 500 field offices spread in 40 countries. The field offices provide analysis of existing and forecasted needs in a given country or region, contribute to the development of intervention strategies and policy development, provide technical support to EU-funded operations, and ensure monitoring of these interventions and facilitate donor's coordination at field level.

In addition to providing funding to humanitarian aid, DG ECHO is also in charge of the EU Civil Protection Mechanism to coordinate the response to disasters in Europe and beyond and contributes to at least 75% of the transport and/or operational costs of deployments. Established in 2001, the Mechanism fosters cooperation among national civil protection authorities across Europe. Currently 37 countries are members of the Mechanism; all 27 EU Member States in addition to Iceland, Norway, Serbia, North Macedonia, Montenegro, Turkey, Albania, Moldova, Ukraine and Bosnia and Herzegovina. The Mechanism was set up to enable coordinated assistance from the participating states to victims of natural and man-made disasters in Europe and elsewhere.

== History ==
The European Community Humanitarian Aid Office (ECHO) was established in 1992 by the Second Delors Commission. With the European Community being abolished in 2009, the office began to be known as the Humanitarian Aid and Civil Protection department of the European Commission or European Union, but kept its ECHO abbreviation.

After the EU was awarded the Nobel Peace Prize in 2012, the Barroso Commission accepted the prize money on behalf of the EU and allocated it to a new initiative called Children of Peace. Approximately €2 million was set aside for the Children of Peace projects in 2013. It was increased to €4 million in 2014.

== Mandate and principles ==
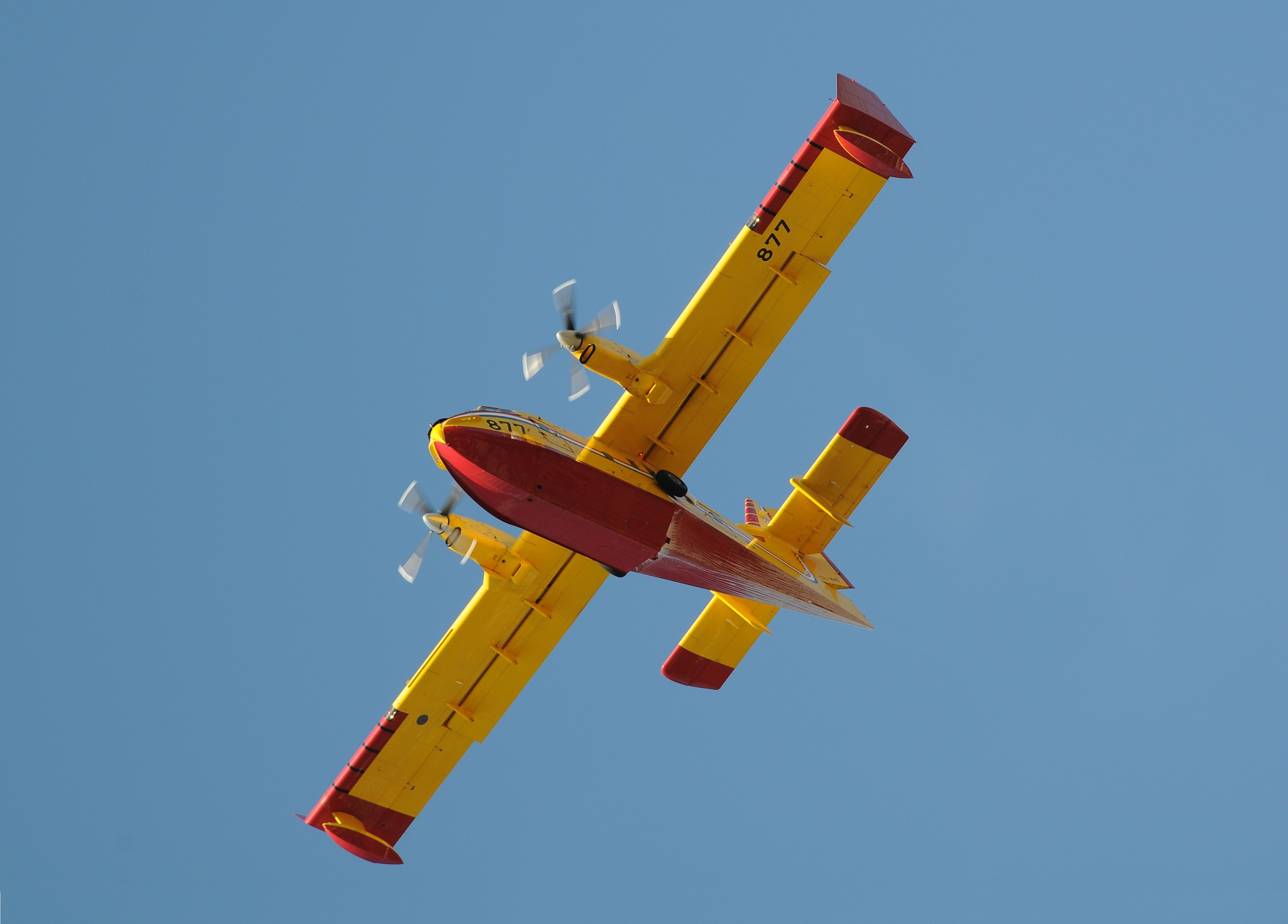
Firefighting planes can be mobilized across participating countries.

DG ECHO's mandate is to provide emergency assistance and relief (in the form of goods and services) to victims of conflict and natural or man-made disasters outside the EU. Its civil protection mandate also extends to disaster prevention and preparedness actions, response and post-crisis operations inside the EU and worldwide.

European humanitarian aid and EU funded humanitarian operations are based on compliance with international law, in particular international humanitarian law, and the humanitarian principles of humanity, neutrality, impartiality, and independence.

In 2007, at the initiative of Commissioner Louis Michel, the European Commission adopted a "European Consensus on Humanitarian Aid" to constitute the first European political text of reference on humanitarian aid. NGOs participated actively to the drafting of the European Consensus and it can be considered "the most comprehensive text and the nearest common position to NGOs". The European Consensus reaffirms the humanitarian principles of humanity, neutrality, impartiality and independence. It also stipulates "humanitarian aid is not a management tool for crises management".

Following its adoption, the Consensus has served as the reference point on the role of humanitarian aid in the EU's broader external action. This was reaffirmed at an event marking the ten years of the European Consensus on Humanitarian Aid in 2017. This is also clearly acknowledged in the Commission Communication on the EU's humanitarian action: new challenges, same principles, which was adopted in March 2021.

== Primary and secondary law ==
Since the Lisbon Treaty came into force, the EU's humanitarian aid action is ruled by Article 214 of the Treaty of the Functioning of the European Union (TFEU). Humanitarian aid is a shared parallel competence: this means that the EU conducts an autonomous policy, which neither prevents the Member States from exercising their competences nor makes the EU's policy merely “complementary” to those of the Member States. The Lisbon Treaty introduced, for the first time, humanitarian aid as a policy in its own right in the Treaties.

As defined in article 214 TFEU, the EU's operations in the field of humanitarian aid are intended to provide ad hoc assistance and relief for people in third countries who are victims of natural or man-made disasters. Article 214 TFEU also makes it clear that EU humanitarian aid operations must be conducted in compliance with the principles of international law and with the principles of impartiality, neutrality and non-discrimination.

The basic act relied upon by DG ECHO to administer EU humanitarian aid finding has been adopted before the Lisbon Treaty and is still mostly in use (setting aside some institutional adaptations to take into account the entry into force of the Lisbon Treaty). The 1996 Humanitarian Aid Regulation lays down the objectives and general principles of EU-funded humanitarian aid as well as the procedures for implementing EU-funded humanitarian aid operations. Concerning the latter aspects, the regulation specifies notably the categories of entities eligible to EU humanitarian funding, while referring to the EU Financial Regulation for what concerns most of the contract-related, financial and administrative procedures to be complied with by DG ECHO.

The EU's competence in the field of Civil Protection is ruled by Article 196 of the Treaty of the Functioning of the European Union Treaty on the functioning of the European Union. The EU has a supporting competence in the field of civil protection. In line with the principle of subsidiarity, the primary responsibility to protecting people, property and the environment, including cultural heritage, lies with the Member States. As part of the 2019 legislative reform, EU Civil Protection was reinforced with the creation of rescEU. The rescEU capacities are available under the EU Civil Protection Mechanism and can be deployed as a last-resort mechanism when Member States are overwhelmed by an emergency. In May 2021, the European Parliament and the Council adopted targeted changes to the legislation. As part of this targeted revision, the Emergency Response Coordination Centre's operational coordination and monitoring role for disasters within and outside the Union was enhanced, as well as the EU role in managing rescEU.

== Emergency Response Coordination Centre ==
The Emergency Response Coordination Centre (ERCC) coordinates the delivery of assistance to disaster stricken countries, such as relief items, expertise, civil protection teams and specialised equipment. Based in Brussels, the Centre ensures the rapid deployment of emergency support and acts as a coordination hub between all EU Member States, the 10 additional Participating States, the affected country, and civil protection and humanitarian experts. The Centre operates 24/7 and can help any country inside or outside the EU affected by a major disaster upon request from the national authorities, a UN body or a relevant international organisation, such as the International Organization for Migration (IOM) or the International Federation of Red Cross and Red Crescent Societies.

The Centre ensures cooperation and coherence of EU action at an inter-institutional level, focusing on coordination mechanisms with the European External Action Service, the Council and EU Member States. It also acts as the central 24/7 contact point when the Solidarity Clause is invoked. It also provides emergency communications and monitoring tools through the Common Emergency Communication and Information System (CECIS), a web-based alert and notification application enabling a real-time exchange of information.

The Centre replaced and extended the functions of the former Monitoring and Information Centre (MIC), that was set up in 2013 by then Commission Vice-President Kristalina Georgieva in her role as International Cooperation, Humanitarian Aid and Crisis Response Commissioner.

The Centre makes use of various Early Warning and Information Systems, including the EU's Copernicus earth observation programme. Through the Copernicus Emergency Management Service, the Centre can make use of high resolution satellite maps to monitor events before they happen, and to assess their impact once they have hit an area.

== Budget ==
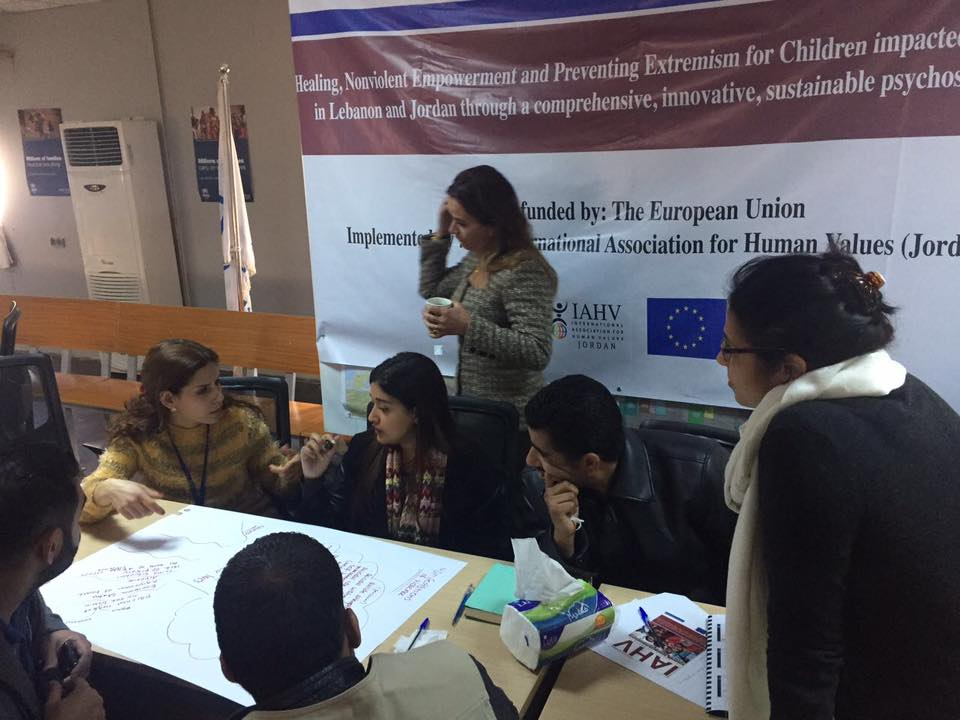
The European Union co-funds psychosocial support by the IAHV, Jordan at the Zaatari refugee camp for the Syrian refugees.

Humanitarian needs kept increasing due to complex crises – often causing massive population displacement – as well as to disasters and epidemic outbreaks. Against this background, DG ECHO has remained a leading humanitarian donor, allocating EUR 2.4 billion to millions of crisis-affected people in more than 80 countries. To address the growing humanitarian funding gap, DG ECHO continued promoting the implementation of the Grand Bargain commitments, notably in relation to multi-sectoral joint needs assessment.

A significant proportion of the EU humanitarian aid was devoted to crisis-affected people inside Syria and its neighbouring countries, including the humanitarian component of the EU Facility for Refugees in Turkey. The EU also focused on supporting populations in "forgotten crises”, such as in the Central African Republic, Sudan, Pakistan, Colombia, Venezuela, Haiti, and the Philippines.

DG ECHO played a leading role in the promotion of a principled humanitarian aid and respect of international humanitarian law. It did so through active advocacy for specific humanitarian crises, but also globally as chair of the Donor Support Group of the International Committee of the Red Cross (ICRC), and of the Good Humanitarian Donorship initiative (with Switzerland).

DG ECHO funds and uses for its evidence-based approach, the INFORM Risk index developed by the Joint Research Centre, and which is becoming the de facto risk assessment methodology for many organisations such as the UN and INGO's. The adopted budget for 2021 is set at €1 491 512 450 in commitments for humanitarian aid and €90 203 000 for civil protection.

== Strategy ==
On 10 March 2021, the European Commission adopted the Communication “the EU's humanitarian action: new challenges, same principles”. The communication sets out a number of key objectives and key actions to address growing humanitarian needs and support a better enabling environment for the delivery of principled humanitarian aid.

Every year, DG ECHO develops a set of priorities in order to co-ordinate its activities efficiently and in an impartial, needs-based approach. To ensure maximum transparency, the department's annual humanitarian priorities are available to the public. In order to establish consistency in the allocation of resources to different countries according to their respective needs, and to guarantee the credibility and transparency of humanitarian aid, the European Commission has developed a set of rigorous needs assessment tools.

Additionally, DG ECHO seeks further synergies with the EU Civil Protection Mechanism to engage with, and support, local and national government structures and response systems, including the use of specific tools such as the Civil Protection Prevention and Preparedness Missions.

== Reform ==
The former commissioner for aid, Louis Michel, had called for aid to be delivered more rapidly, to greater effect and on humanitarian principles.

The appointment of a new commissioner with a portfolio for International cooperation, humanitarian aid and crisis response corresponds to articles 214 and 196 of the Treaty of Lisbon where Humanitarian aid and Civil Protection play a sustainable role. ECHO's official name was changed to Directorate-General for Humanitarian Aid and Civil Protection. The transformation of ECHO and the movement of the Civil Protection unit from DG Environment to DG ECHO is a step forward for better cooperation and decision making in a field where rapid reaction is lifesaving.

Clare Short, former British International Development Secretary said the European Commission ran ‘the worst development agency in the world’ and branded its operations ‘an outrage and a disgrace’. Since 2012, the Commission developed an action plan and guidelines on resilience and linking between relief, rehabilitation and development (LRRD).

The Commission passed new legislation in 2013 on the EU Civil Protection Mechanism which provides better coordination and support to improve effectiveness of prevention, preparation, and response systems during disasters. The legislation establishes a voluntary pool of pre-committed response capacities and materials, a training network for first responders, and a new approach for disaster risk management from 31 participating states.

The EU Civil Protection Mechanism also established the opening of the new Emergency Response Coordination Centre (ERCC), a civil protection 'hub' for monitoring disasters and enhancing preparedness and resilience of disaster-prone countries. The most recent uses of the Civil Protection mechanism occurred during flooding in Bosnia and Herzegovina and Serbia in 2014 and evacuating EU nationals during the COVID-19 pandemic.

In 2022, the Scientific Advice Mechanism to the European Commission delivered a major piece of advice on improving strategic crisis management in the European Union. As well as summarising the historical and current provision within DG-ECHO and elsewhere, the advice recommends "that existing and future legislation and instruments should be integrated in a framework that is capable of dealing with increasingly systemic and large-scale crises in a structural way".

== European Parliament Report ==
The Committee on Development (CD) of the EP commissioned the Overseas Development Institute to undertake a project on the effectiveness of international development assistance from the European Commission in 2010. The project focused on the cases of Cambodia, Mozambique and Peru. The findings and policy suggested can be summarized as follows:

1. Harmonisation and alignment (H&A) is crucial for state capacity and should be expanded from sharing and spreading information to increasing joint activities in the short-term.
2. Donor harmonisation efforts need to be scaled up to include agreements on joint technical assistance and the streamlining of systems and procedures
3. Extremely fragmented aid systems impose unreasonably high transaction costs on the government, drains valuable resources, and fundamentally weakens state capacity.
4. EC procedures and structures remain highly complicated and bureaucratic.
5. Much of the success or failure of cooperation depends on individual interactions, specific innovators and appropriate staffing levels to carry out the tasks at hand, but the costs are also quite high.
6. Country Strategy Papers could improve aid effectiveness — but their quality is uneven.
7. Relations between HQ and delegations needs to be improved.

== See also ==
- European Commissioner for Crisis Management
- Directorate-General for Civil Protection and Emergencies (Spain)
- Office for the Coordination of Humanitarian Affairs (UN)
- Emergency management
- Civil defense by country#Europe
