= Phare =

Instruments to assist countries joining the EU

The Phare programme is one of the three pre-accession instruments financed by the European Union to assist the applicant countries of Central and Eastern Europe wishing to join the European Union in creating the conditions necessary for a market-oriented economy.

== History ==
Originally created in 1989 as the Poland and Hungary: Assistance for Restructuring their Economies (PHARE) programme, Phare expanded from Poland and Hungary to cover ten countries. It assisted eight of the ten 2004 accession member states: the Czech Republic, Estonia, Hungary, Latvia, Lithuania, Poland, Slovakia, and Slovenia, as well as those countries that acceded in 2007 (Bulgaria and Romania), in a period of massive economic restructuring and political change. Phare means 'lighthouse' in French.

Until 2000, countries of the Western Balkans (Albania, North Macedonia, and Bosnia-Herzegovina) were also beneficiaries of Phare. However, as of 2001, the CARDS programme (Community Assistance for Reconstruction, Development and Stability in the Balkans) has provided financial assistance to these countries.

Following the 1993 Copenhagen Council's invitation to Central and Eastern European countries to apply for membership, PHARE support was reoriented towards this aim, including a marked expansion of support for infrastructure investment. PHARE's total pre-accession focus was put in place in 1997, in response to the Luxembourg Council’s launching of the present enlargement process. Phare funds focus entirely on the pre-accession priorities highlighted in the Road Maps and the Accession Partnerships which establish the overall priorities the country must address to prepare for accession and the resources available to help them do so. The National Programme for the Adoption of the Acquis is the candidate country's timetable for preparing its accession. It estimates the timing and cost of the steps needed to prepare the country for membership and the implications for staff and financial resources.

== Objectives ==
1. Strengthen public administrations and institutions to function effectively inside the European Union.
2. Promote convergence with the European Union’s extensive legislation (the Community acquis) and reduce the need for transition periods.
3. Promote Economic and Social Cohesion.

These orientations were further refined in 1999 with the creation of SAPARD and ISPA, which took over rural and agricultural development (SAPARD) and infrastructural projects in the environmental and transport fields (ISPA) allowing Phare to focus on its key priorities that were not covered by these fields.

After all 10 countries which previously were eligible for the Phare programme became member states of the European Union, substantial changes were made to the scope of the Phare programme. 2003 was the final programming year for the new member states, but contracting of projects continued until 2005 and payments based on these contracts continued until 2006. In May 2004 the new member states had to take over the full responsibility for the management of the Phare programme through a process of Extended Decentralisation.

== See also ==
- Directorate-General for Enlargement (European Commission)
