= Secretariat-General of the European Commission =

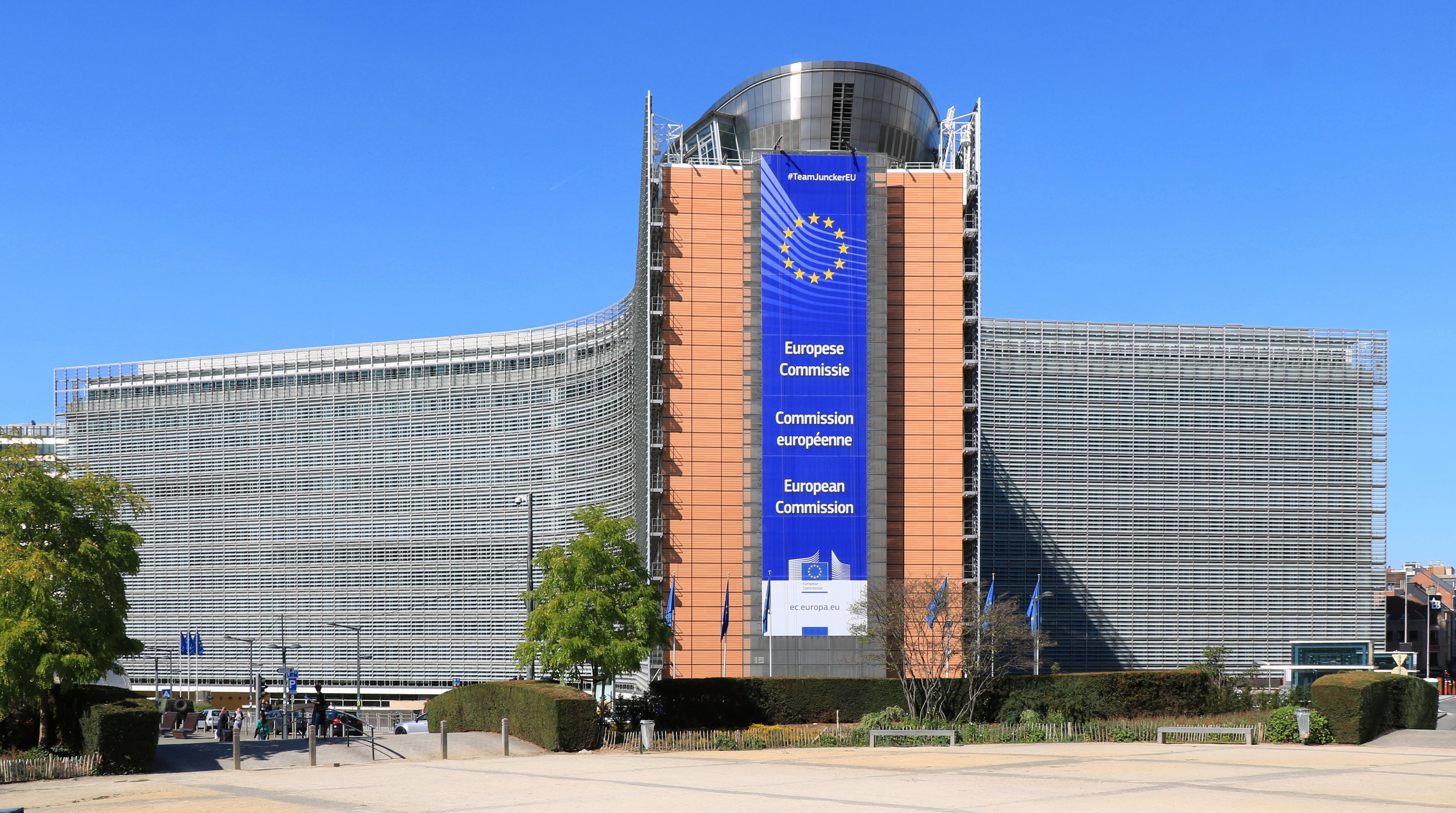
The Berlaymont Building in Brussels, headquarters of the Secretariat-General of the European Commission

The Secretariat-General (SG) is a service department of the European Commission. The SG is based in the Berlaymont in Brussels (Belgium). The SG supports the whole of the Commission, and in particular the 27 Commissioners. The head of the SG is the Secretary-General of the European Commission.

The SG, under the remit of the President, has a high degree of importance in the Commission. It organises meetings, controls the agenda and is responsible for the minutes. The President makes use of this power in their running of the Commission.

== See also ==
- General Secretariat of the Council of the European Union
