= Diplomatic missions of the European Union =

EU diplomatic missions

European Union Countries with EU delegations

The member states of the European Union are aligned in their foreign policy on many issues. The EU is the world's largest economic union, customs union and donor of humanitarian and development assistance and thus has an extensive network of delegations around the world mainly operating in the framework of External Relations, for which the European Commission is the main decision body. The EU also represents shared political and security viewpoints held by its member states, as articulated in the Common Foreign and Security Policy.

The EU's predecessor, the European Coal and Steel Community, opened its first mission in London in 1955, after three years non-EU countries began to accredit their missions in Brussels to the Community. The US had been a fervent supporter of the ECSC's efforts from the beginning, and Secretary of State Dean Acheson sent Jean Monnet a dispatch in the name of President Truman confirming full US diplomatic recognition of the ECSC. A US ambassador to the ECSC was accredited soon thereafter, and he headed the second overseas mission to establish diplomatic relations with the Community institutions.

The number of delegates began to rise in the 1960s following the merging of the executive institutions of the three European Communities into a single Commission. Until recently some states had reservations accepting that EU delegations held the full status of a diplomatic mission. Article 20 of the Maastricht Treaty requires the Delegations and the Member States' diplomatic missions to "co-operate in ensuring that the common positions and joint actions adopted by the Council are complied with and implemented".

Management of the EU External Relations is conducted by the European External Action Service which reports to the High Representative for Foreign Affairs. Delegates are generally sent only to capital cities and cities hosting multilateral bodies.

The EU missions work separately from the work of the missions of its member states; however, in some circumstances it may share resources and facilities. In Abuja, the EU mission shares its premises with a number of member states. The European Commission also maintains representation in each of the member states. For details on diplomatic representation, see Foreign relations of the European Union#Diplomatic representation.

== Europe ==
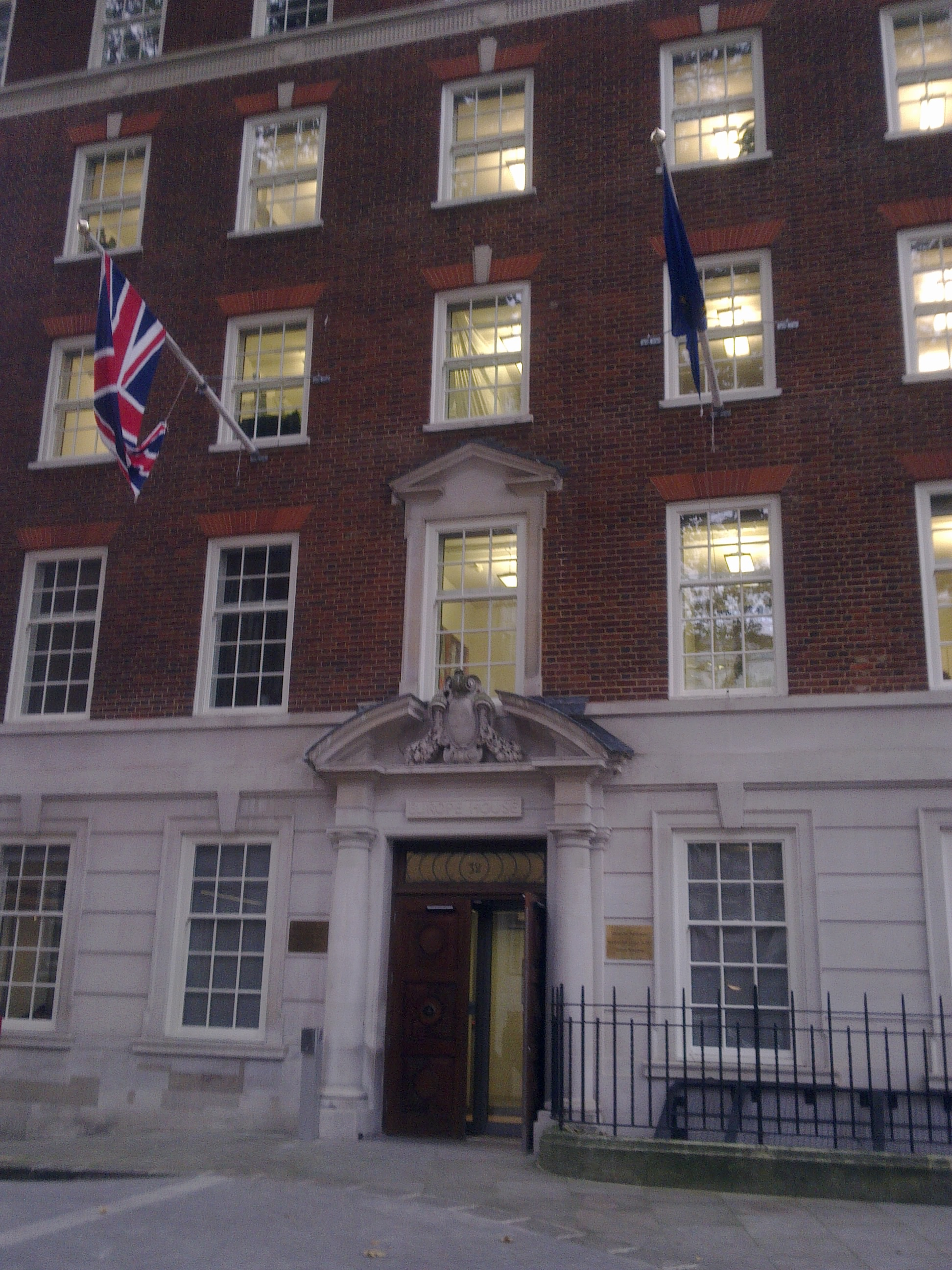
European Union Delegation in London

- Albania
  - Tirana (Delegation)
- Armenia
  - Yerevan (Delegation (Note: As part of the process of establishment of the European External Action Service envisioned in the recently ratified Treaty of Lisbon, on 1 January 2010 all former European Commission delegations were renamed into European Union delegations and till the end of the month 54 of the missions were transformed into embassy-type missions that employ greater powers than the regular delegations. These upgraded delegations have taken on the role previously carried out by the national embassies of the member state holding the rotating Presidency of the Council of the European Union.))
- Azerbaijan
  - Baku (Delegation)
- Belarus
  - Minsk (Delegation)
- Bosnia and Herzegovina
  - Sarajevo (Delegation)
- Georgia
  - Tbilisi (Delegation)
- Iceland
  - Reykjavík (Delegation)
- Kosovo
  - Pristina (European Commission Liaison Office)
  - Mitrovica (Office)
- Moldova
  - Chișinău (Delegation)
- Montenegro
  - Podgorica (Delegation)
- North Macedonia
  - Skopje (Delegation)
- Norway
  - Oslo (Delegation)
- Russia
  - Moscow (Delegation)
- Serbia
  - Belgrade (Delegation)
- Switzerland
  - Bern (Delegation)
- Turkey
  - Ankara (Delegation)
- Ukraine
  - Kyiv (Delegation)
- United Kingdom
  - London (Delegation)

== Africa ==
- Algeria
  - Algiers (Delegation)
- Angola
  - Luanda (Delegation)
- Benin
  - Cotonou (Delegation)
- Botswana
  - Gaborone (Delegation)
- Burkina Faso
  - Ouagadougou (Delegation)
- Burundi
  - Bujumbura (Delegation)
- Cameroon
  - Yaoundé (Delegation)
- Cape Verde
  - Praia (Delegation)
- Central African Republic
  - Bangui (Delegation)
- Chad
  - N'Djamena (Delegation)
- Comoros
  - Moroni (Delegation)
- Congo-Brazzaville
  - Brazzaville (Delegation)
- Congo-Kinshasa
  - Kinshasa (Delegation)
- Djibouti
  - Djibouti (Delegation)
- Egypt
  - Cairo (Delegation)
- Eritrea
  - Asmara (Delegation)
- Eswatini
  - Mbabane (Delegation)
- Ethiopia
  - Addis Ababa (Delegation)
- Gabon
  - Libreville (Delegation)
- Gambia
  - Banjul (Delegation)
- Ghana
  - Accra (Delegation)
- Guinea
  - Conakry (Delegation)
- Guinea-Bissau
  - Bissau (Delegation)
- Ivory Coast
  - Abidjan (Delegation)
- Kenya
  - Nairobi (Delegation)
- Lesotho
  - Maseru (Delegation)
- Liberia
  - Monrovia (Delegation)
- Libya
  - Tripoli (Delegation)
- Madagascar
  - Antananarivo (Delegation)
- Malawi
  - Lilongwe (Delegation)
- Mali
  - Bamako (Delegation)
- Mauritania
  - Nouakchott (Delegation)
- Mauritius
  - Port Louis (Delegation)
- Morocco
  - Rabat (Delegation)
- Mozambique
  - Maputo (Delegation)
- Namibia
  - Windhoek (Delegation)
- Niger
  - Niamey (Delegation)
- Nigeria
  - Abuja (Delegation)
- Rwanda
  - Kigali (Delegation)
- Senegal
  - Dakar (Delegation)
- Sierra Leone
  - Freetown (Delegation)
- Somalia
  - Mogadishu (Delegation)
- South Africa
  - Pretoria (Delegation)
- South Sudan
  - Juba (Delegation)
- Sudan
  - Khartoum (Delegation)
- Tanzania
  - Dar es Salaam (Delegation)
- Togo
  - Lomé (Delegation)
- Tunisia
  - Tunis (Delegation)
- Uganda
  - Kampala (Delegation)
- Zambia
  - Lusaka (Delegation)
- Zimbabwe
  - Harare (Delegation)

== Americas ==
Delegation of the European Union in Asunción

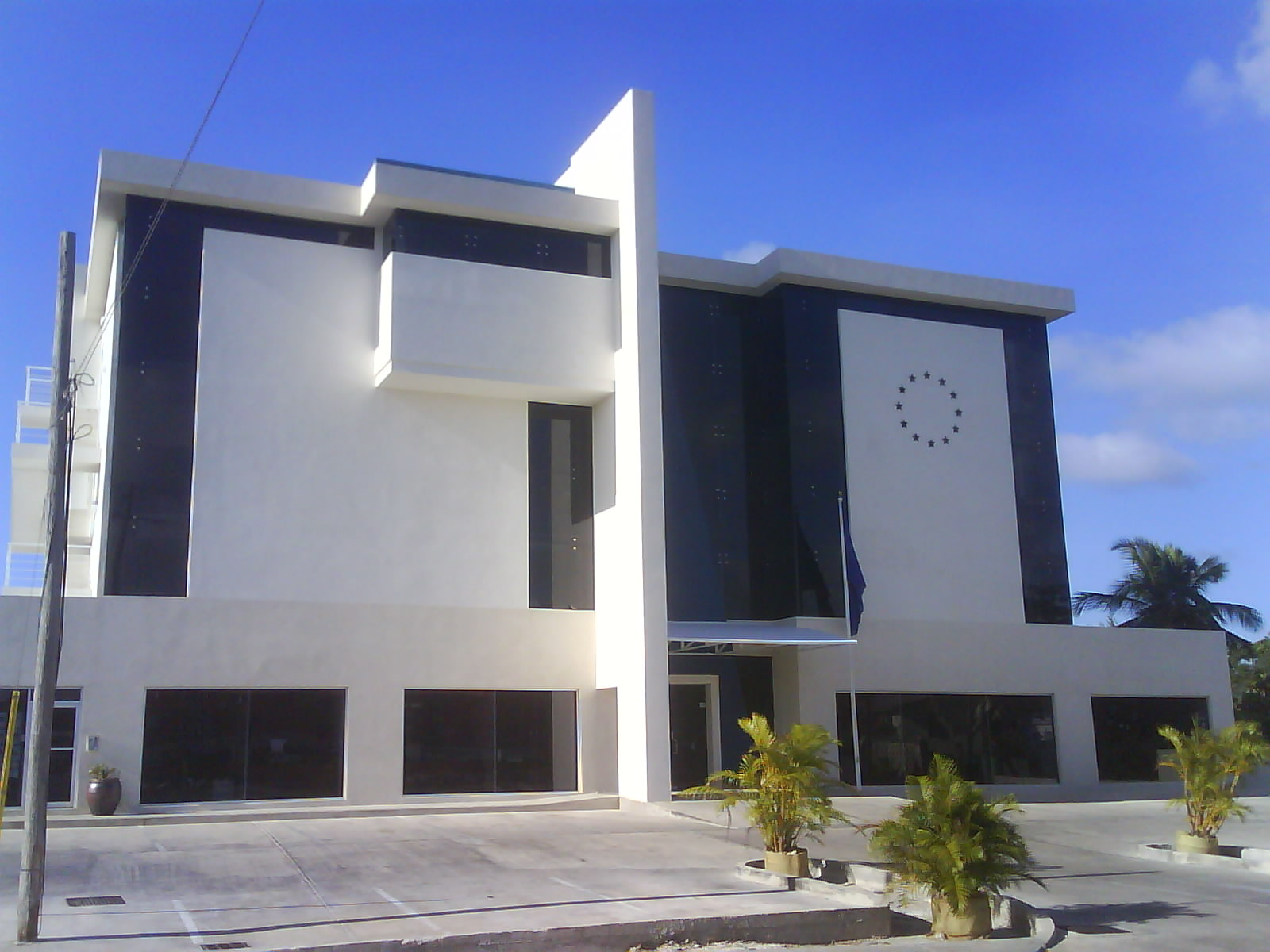
European Commission's Eastern Caribbean branch office in Barbados

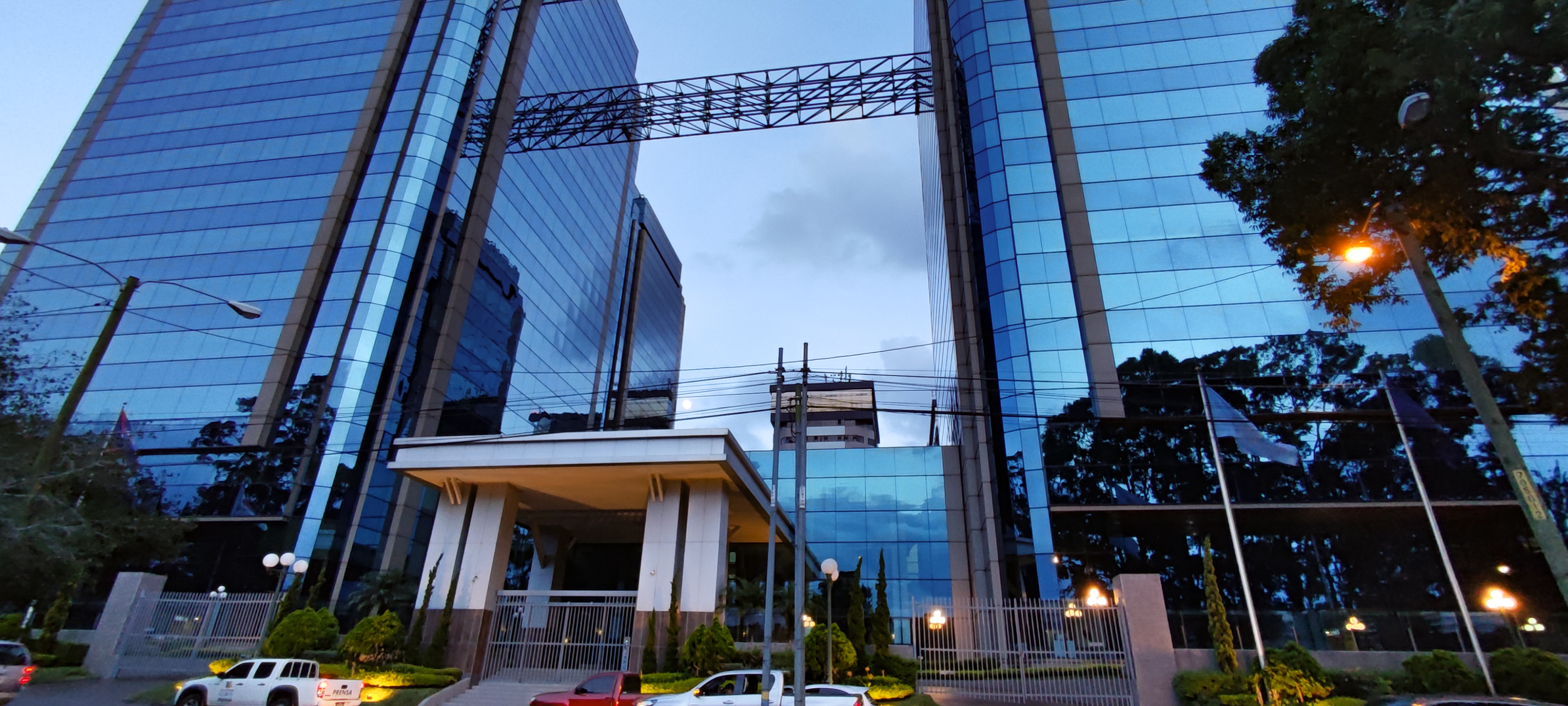
Building hosting the Delegation of the European Union in Guatemala City

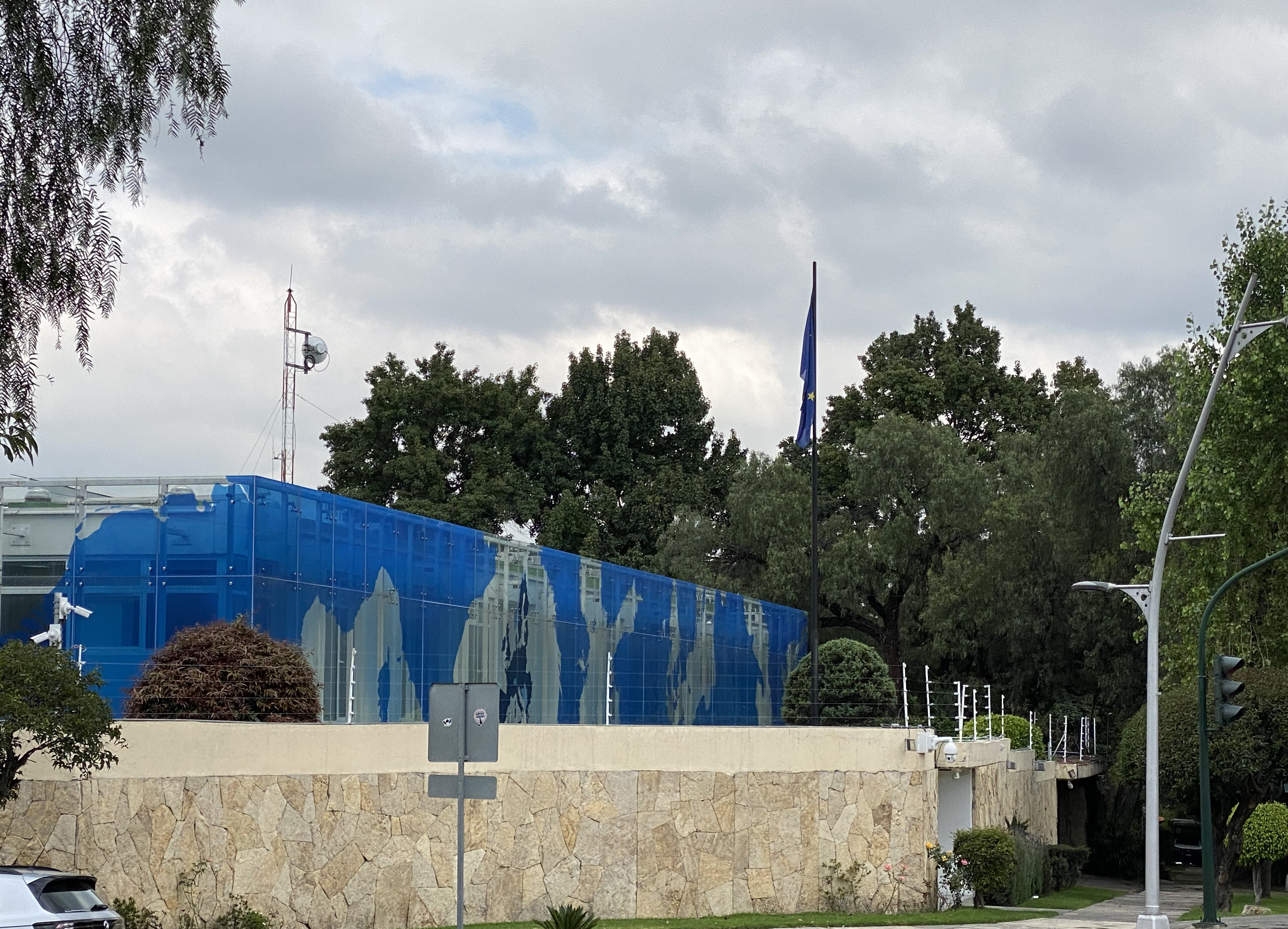
Delegation of the European Union in Mexico City

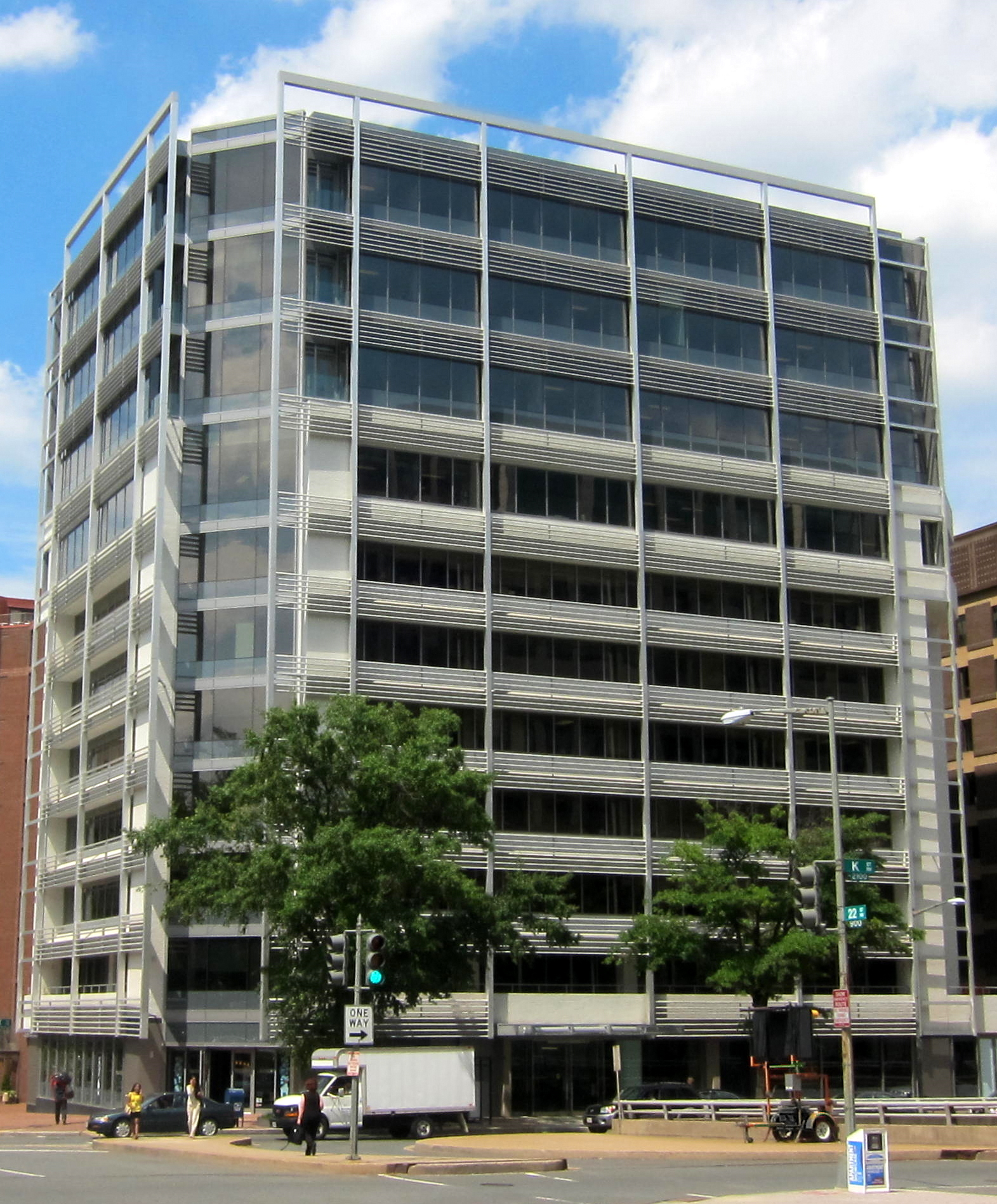
European Union Delegation in Washington, D.C.

- Argentina
  - Buenos Aires (Delegation)
- Barbados
  - Bridgetown (Delegation)
- Bolivia
  - La Paz (Delegation)
- Brazil
  - Brasília (Delegation)
- Canada
  - Ottawa (Delegation)
- Chile
  - Santiago de Chile (Delegation)
- Costa Rica
  - San Jose (Delegation)
- Colombia
  - Bogotá (Delegation)
- Cuba
  - Havana (Delegation)
- Dominican Republic
  - Santo Domingo (Delegation)
- Ecuador
  - Quito (Delegation)
- El Salvador
  - San Salvador (Delegation)
- Guatemala
  - Ciudad de Guatemala (Delegation)
- Guyana
  - Georgetown (Delegation)
- Haiti
  - Port-au-Prince (Delegation)
- Honduras
  - Tegucigalpa (Delegation)
- Jamaica
  - Kingston (Delegation)
- Mexico
  - Mexico City (Delegation)
- Nicaragua
  - Managua (Delegation)
- Panama
  - Panama City (Delegation)
- Paraguay
  - Asunción (Delegation)
- Peru
  - Lima (Delegation)
- Trinidad and Tobago
  - Port of Spain (Delegation)
- United States
  - Washington, D.C. (Delegation)
  - San Francisco (Office)
- Uruguay
  - Montevideo (Delegation)
- Venezuela
  - Caracas (Delegation)

== Asia ==
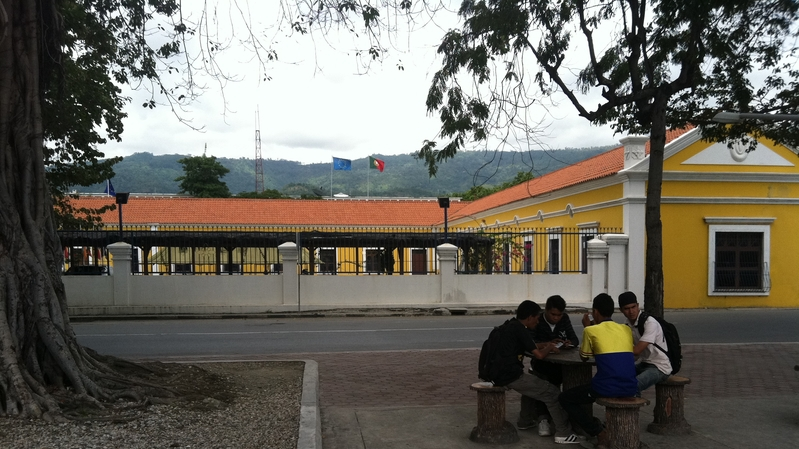
Casa Europa in Dili, East Timor

- Afghanistan
  - Kabul (Delegation)
- Bangladesh
  - Dhaka (Delegation)
- Cambodia
  - Phnom Penh (Delegation)
- China
  - Beijing (Delegation)
  - Hong Kong (Office)
  - Macau (Office)
- East Timor
  - Dili (Delegation)
- India
  - New Delhi (Delegation)
- Indonesia
  - Jakarta (Delegation)
- Iraq
  - Baghdad (Delegation)
- Israel
  - Tel Aviv (Delegation)
- Japan
  - Tokyo (Delegation)
- Jordan
  - Amman (Delegation)
- Kazakhstan
  - Astana (Delegation)
  - Almaty (Office)
- Kuwait
  - Kuwait City (Delegation)
- Kyrgyzstan
  - Bishkek (Delegation)
- Laos
  - Vientiane (Delegation)
- Lebanon
  - Beirut (Delegation)
- Malaysia
  - Kuala Lumpur (Delegation)
- Mongolia
  - Ulaanbaatar (Delegation)
- Myanmar
  - Yangon (Delegation)
- Nepal
  - Kathmandu (Delegation)
- Pakistan
  - Islamabad (Delegation)
- Palestine
  - East Jerusalem (Technical Assistance Office)
- Philippines
  - Manila (Delegation)
- Qatar
  - Doha (Delegation)
- Saudi Arabia
  - Riyadh (Delegation)
- Singapore
  - Singapore (Delegation)
- South Korea
  - Seoul (Delegation)
- Sri Lanka
  - Colombo (Delegation)
- Syria
  - Damascus (Delegation)
- Republic of China (Taiwan)
  - Taipei (Economic & Trade Office)
- Tajikistan
  - Dushanbe (Delegation)
- Thailand
  - Bangkok (Delegation)
- Turkmenistan
  - Ashgabat (Delegation)
- United Arab Emirates
  - Abu Dhabi (Delegation)
  - Dubai (Delegation)
- Uzbekistan
  - Tashkent (Delegation)
- Vietnam
  - Hanoi (Delegation)

== Oceania ==
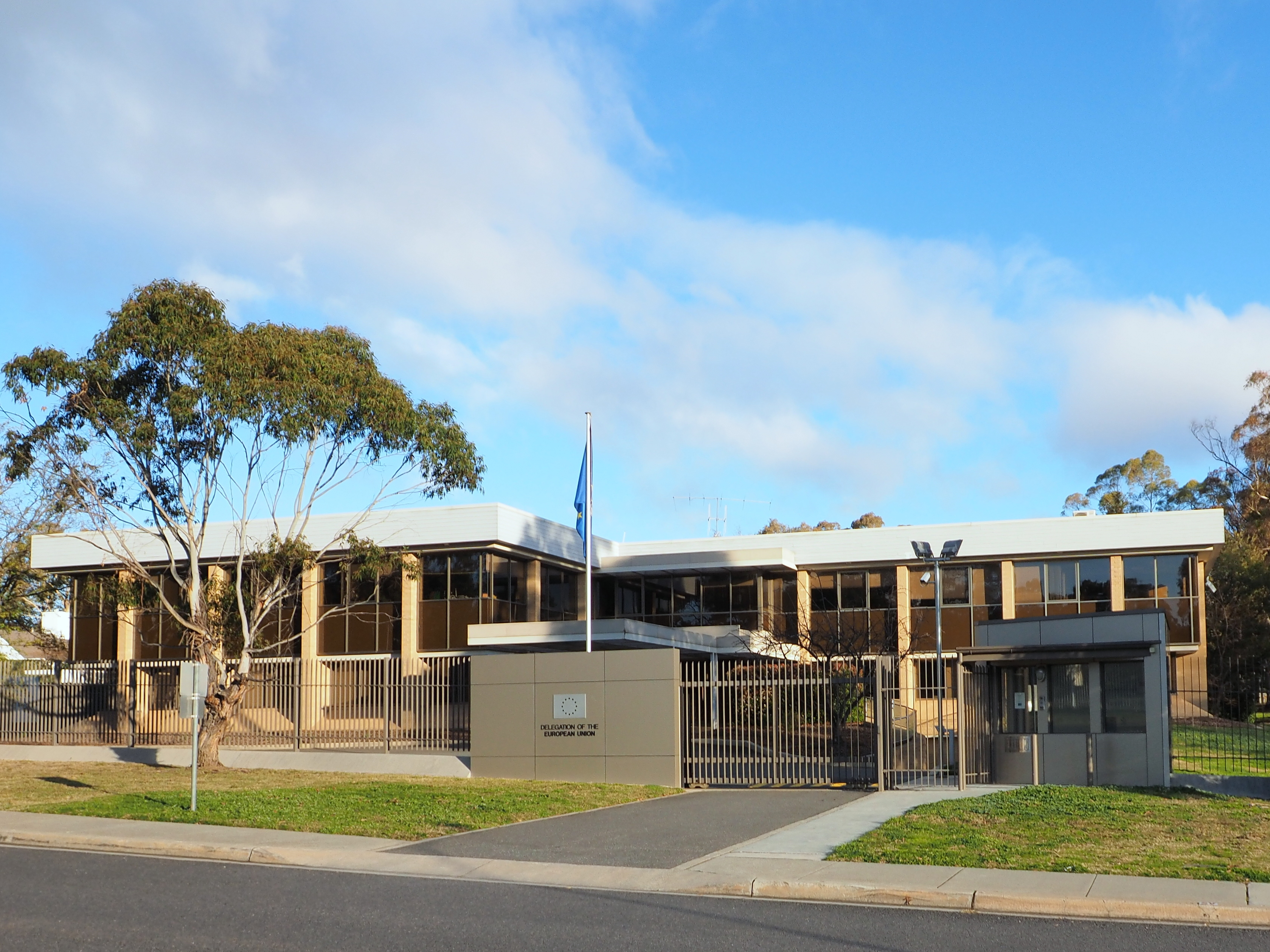
The Delegation of the European Union to Australia

- Australia
  - Canberra (Delegation)
- Fiji
  - Suva (Delegation)
- New Zealand
  - Wellington (Delegation)
- Papua New Guinea
  - Port Moresby (Delegation)
- Samoa
  - Apia (Delegation)
- Solomon Islands
  - Honiara (Delegation)
- Vanuatu
  - Port Vila (Delegation)

== Multilateral organisations ==
- Addis Ababa (Delegation to the African Union)
- Geneva (Delegation to UN organisations and the World Trade Organization)
- Jakarta (Delegation to ASEAN)
- New York City (Delegation to the United Nations)
- Paris (Delegation to UNESCO and the Organisation for Economic Co-operation and Development)
- Rome (Delegation to the Holy See, Order of Malta, San Marino and UN organisations: Food and Agriculture Organization, WFP, IFAD)
- Strasbourg (Delegation to the Council of Europe)
- Vienna (Delegation to the international organisations in Vienna: IAEA, UNODC, UNIDO and the Organization for Security and Co-operation in Europe)

== Non-resident Delegation ==
Resident in Bridgetown, Barbados

- Antigua and Barbuda
- Dominica
- Grenada
- Saint Kitts and Nevis
- Saint Lucia
- Saint Vincent and the Grenadines

Resident in Suva, Fiji

- Kiribati
- Marshall Islands
- Micronesia
- Nauru
- Palau
- Tonga
- Tuvalu

== Missions to open ==
- Iran
- Oman

== See also ==
- Accreditations and Responsibilities of EU delegations – for non-resident missions
- Delegations of the European Parliament
- Delegation of the European Union to Canada
- Delegation of the European Union to the United Kingdom
- Delegation of the European Union to the United Nations
- Delegation of the European Union to the United States
- European External Action Service
- Foreign relations of the European Union
- List of diplomatic missions to the European Union
- List of European Union ambassadors
- CARIFORUM
