= Stefano Sannino =

Italian diplomat and civil servant

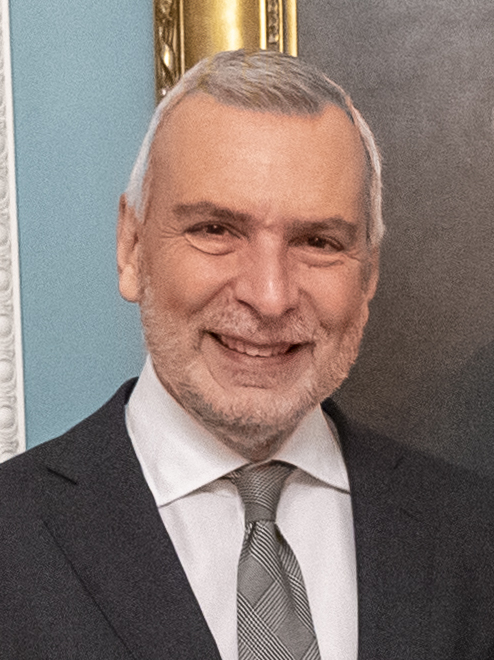
- Stefano Sannino (2023)

Secretary General, European External Action Service
- In office 1 January 2021 – January 2025
- Preceded by: Helga Schmid
- Succeeded by: Belén Martínez Carbonell

Italian Ambassador to Spain
- In office 16 November 2016 – 2020
- Prime Minister: Matteo Renzi
- Preceded by: Pietro Sebastiani
- Succeeded by: Riccardo Guariglia

Personal details
- Born: 24 December 1959 (age 66) Portici, Italy
- Education: University of Naples Federico II

Stefano Sannino (born 24 December 1959 in Portici) is an Italian diplomat and European civil servant.

== Career ==
After studying political science at the University of Naples, Sannino entered the Italian diplomatic service in 1986. He served as deputy chief of mission at the Italian embassy in Belgrade (1994–96), before being seconded to the Italian government as head of office of the secretary of state for foreign affairs in the first Prodi government (1996–98). In 1998–2001, Sannino was chief of staff to Italy's trade ministers Piero Fassino, and then Enrico Letta. He then went back to diplomacy, and to Belgrade, as head of the OSCE mission in the Federal Republic of Yugoslavia (2001–02).

Sannino began his career at the European Commission in 2002 as an adviser for external relations and trade in the cabinet of the then President of the European Commission Romano Prodi, together with Sandro Gozi. He was Director for Crisis Management and Representative of the Commission to the Political and Security Committee (2004–2006), before following Prodi in his second term as Italy's Prime Minister in 2006–08, as diplomatic adviser.

Back in Brussels in 2008, Sannino served as Director for relations with Latin America (2008–2009), and Deputy Director-General for External Relations in charge of Asia and Latin America (2009–2010). He then moved to the Directorate-General for Enlargement of the European Commission, where he was Deputy Director-General from 2010 to 2011 and Director-General from April 2011 to July 2013. He left this post to become Italy's Permanent Representative to the EU in 2013, appointed by the new Prime Minister Enrico Letta.

In January 2016, Italy's Prime Minister Matteo Renzi decided to replace Sannino with the Deputy Minister for Industry, Carlo Calenda. The move is controversial, as Calenda is the first non-diplomat to serve in the post of Permanent Representative to the EU, and had only recently joined Renzi's PD. Sannino was instead appointed as Italian ambassador to Spain. (Calenda will leave the post merely two months later, appointed by Renzi as new Minister for Economic Development)

In February 2020, the new EU High Representative for Foreign and Security Policy, Josep Borrell, appointed Sannino as Assistant Secretary-General for Economic and Global Affairs of the European External Action Service. In December 2020, he was appointed new Secretary General of the European External Action Service, to replace Helga Schmid, starting from 2021. He was replaced by Belén Martínez Carbonell in January 2025.

As of 1 February 2025 he leads Directorate-General for the Middle East, North Africa and the Gulf within the European Commission.

In December 2025, Sannino was detained by Belgian police during a raid on the EU's foreign service and the College of Europe. According to the European Public Prosecutor's Office (EPPO), the operation is part of an ongoing investigation focused on "suspected fraud related to EU-funded training for junior diplomats."

== Other activities ==
- European Council on Foreign Relations (ECFR), Member

== Personal life ==
Sannino was married to the daughter of a former Italian diplomat. She died after Sannino's posting as the Head of OSCE's Mission in Serbia in 2002. Sannino is married with Catalan Santiago Mondragón Vial. He received the Transexualia 2016 prize, for his support to the social inclusion of trans persons in Spain, and the LGBT Andalucía prize (together with the former US Ambassador to Spain, James Costos) for his efforts in the fight against homophobia. In 2018, he raised the rainbow flag on the Italian Embassy in the occasion of the Madrid Pride.

== Honors ==
Grand Officer of the Order of Merit of the Italian Republic – December 27, 2022

== See also ==
- Ministry of Foreign Affairs (Italy)
- Foreign relations of Italy
- European External Action Service
