= Directorate-General for Budget =

The Directorate-General for Budget (DG BUDG) is a Directorate-General of the European Commission.

The task of the Directorate-General for Budget is to secure from the budgetary authority - the European Parliament and the Council of the European Union (Council of Ministers) - the resources needed to implement the European Union's policies, to encourage sound management of European Community funds and to account for the use of appropriations. The current Director-General is Stéphanie Riso.

== See also ==
- European Commissioner for Budget and Administration
