= Committee on Agriculture =

Committee on Agriculture or Committee for Agriculture can refer to:

- United States House Committee on Agriculture
- United States Senate Committee on Agriculture, Nutrition and Forestry
- European Parliament Committee on Agriculture and Rural Development
- Special Committee on Agriculture (SCA), an administrative body of the European Union that prepares the work and tasks of the Agriculture and Fisheries
- Standing Committee on Agriculture, Australia
- Canada–United States Consultative Committee on Agriculture
- Canadian House of Commons Standing Committee on Agriculture and Agri-Food
- Committee for Agriculture, Environment and Rural Affairs, Northern Ireland
- Standing Committee on Agriculture, Animal Husbandry and Food Processing (Parliament of India)
