= EFCA =

EFCA may refer to:

- Evangelical Free Church of America, a group of evangelical Christian congregations in the United States
- Employee Free Choice Act, proposed United States federal legislation
- European Fisheries Control Agency, an agency of the European Union (EU) based in Vigo, Spain
- Environmental full-cost accounting, a method of cost accounting that traces direct costs and allocates indirect costs by collecting and presenting information about the possible environmental costs and benefits
