= ECCP =

ECCP may refer to:

- Eminent Chinese of the Ch'ing Period, a biographical dictionary of the Qing dynasty
- Energy and Climate Change Policy, a program of the Government of Canada
- European Centre for Conflict Prevention, a Dutch non-governmental organisation
- European Climate Change Programme, an EU framework for implementing the Kyoto Protocol
- European Cluster Collaboration Platform, a European online hub for industry clusters
- European Coordination of Committees and Associations for Palestine, a network dedicated to freedom and justice for Palestinians
- Examination of Clinical Counselor Practice, administered by the National Board for Certified Counselors
- White House Office of Energy and Climate Change Policy, a United States government entity
