= Directorate-General for Agriculture, Fisheries, Social Affairs and Health =

The Directorate-General for Agriculture, Fisheries, Social Affairs and Health is a directorate-general of the Council of the European Union that prepares the work and tasks of the Agriculture and Fisheries Council.

== See also ==
- Special Committee on Agriculture
- Committee of Permanent Representatives
- European Parliament Committee on Agriculture and Rural Development
- European Parliament Committee on Fisheries
- European Commissioner for Agriculture and Rural Development
  - Directorate-General for Agriculture and Rural Development
- European Commissioner for Maritime Affairs and Fisheries
  - Directorate-General for Maritime Affairs and Fisheries
- Community Plant Variety Office
- European Food Safety Authority
- European Fisheries Control Agency
