= María Salas =

Mary or María Salas may refer to:

- María Marcos Cedillo Salas (1910–1933), Mexican aviator
- María Salas Larrazábal (1922–2008), Spanish writer
- Mary Salas (born 1948), American legislator and mayor from California
- María Angeles Benítez Salas, Spanish official of European Union since 1983
- María Salas (Paralympian) (born 1969), Mexican shot putter and javelin thrower
- María Paula Salas (born 2002), Costa Rican footballer
