= Nathalie Loiseau =

French politician and diplomat (born 1964)

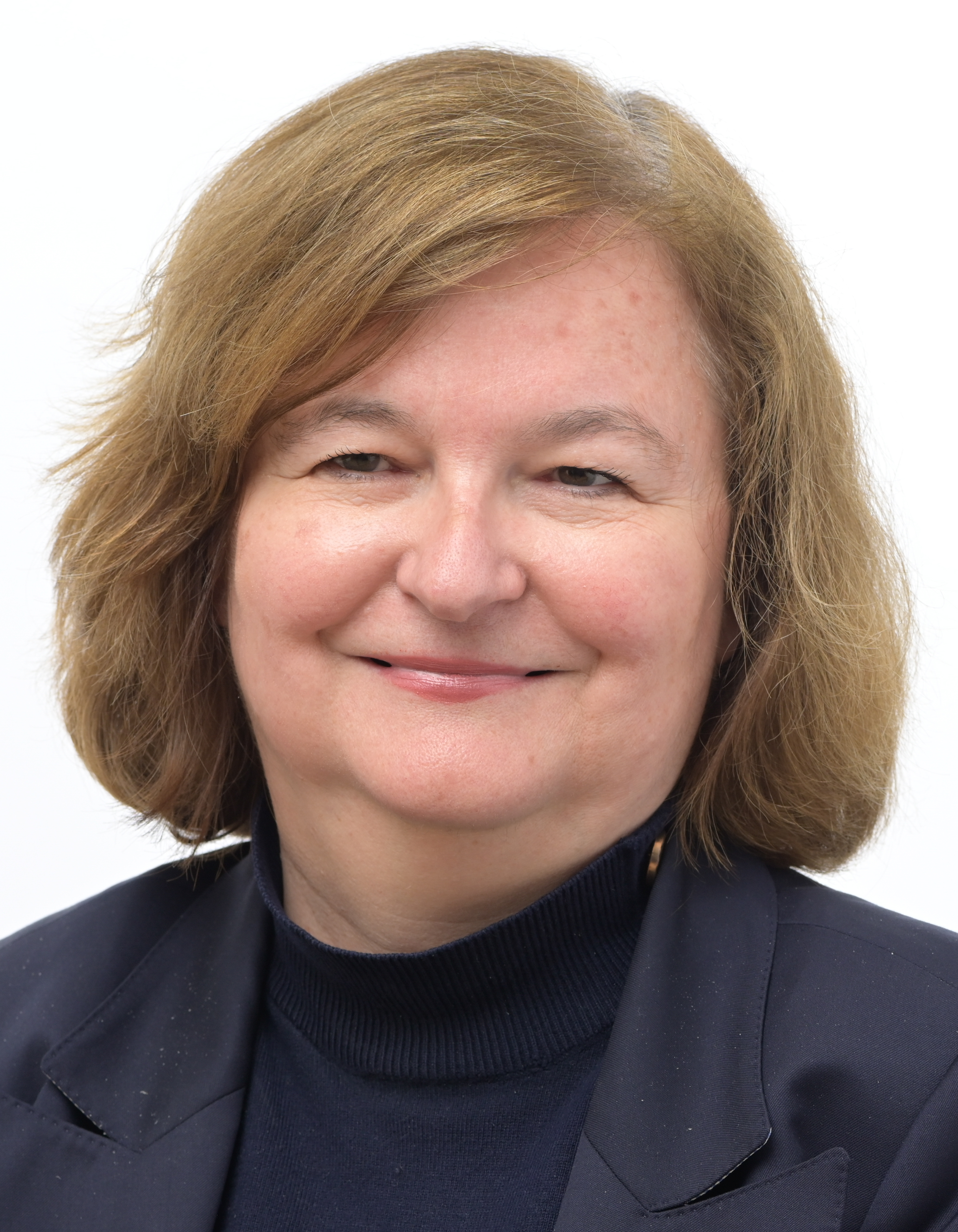
- Official portrait, 2024

Member of the European Parliament
- Incumbent
- Assumed office 2 July 2019
- Parliamentary group: Renew Europe
- Constituency: France

Minister for European Affairs
- In office 21 June 2017 – 27 March 2019
- Prime Minister: Édouard Philippe
- Preceded by: Marielle de Sarnez
- Succeeded by: Amélie de Montchalin

Director of the École nationale d'administration
- In office 3 October 2012 – 21 June 2017
- Preceded by: Bernard Boucault
- Succeeded by: Patrick Gérard

Personal details
- Born: Nathalie Lydie Jeanne Ducoulombier; 1 June 1964 (age 61) Neuilly-sur-Seine, France
- Party: HOR (since 2021)
- Other political affiliations: LREM (2017–2021)
- Spouse: Bertrand Loiseau (m. 1992)
- Children: 4
- Education: Lycée Carnot
- Alma mater: Sciences Po; Inalco

Nathalie Lydie Jeanne Loiseau (French: [natali lwazo]; born 1 June 1964) is a French politician, diplomat and academic administrator who has served as a Member of European Parliament since 2019. Previously she was director of the École nationale d'administration (ENA) from 2012 to 2017 and served as the French Minister for European Affairs from 21 June 2017 to 27 March 2019. She was the top candidate of the La République En Marche electoral list in the 2019 European elections.

== Early life ==
Nathalie Loiseau was born on 1 June 1964 in Neuilly-sur-Seine, France. Her father was a corporate consultant in mergers and acquisitions.

Loiseau graduated from Sciences Po in 1983. In 1984, she appeared on a list of candidates for a students' union linked to the far-right Groupe Union Défense; she later said that she had agreed to this as a favor to a friend and knowing nothing about the union. She also studied Chinese language at the Institut national des langues et civilisations orientales.

== Career in diplomacy ==
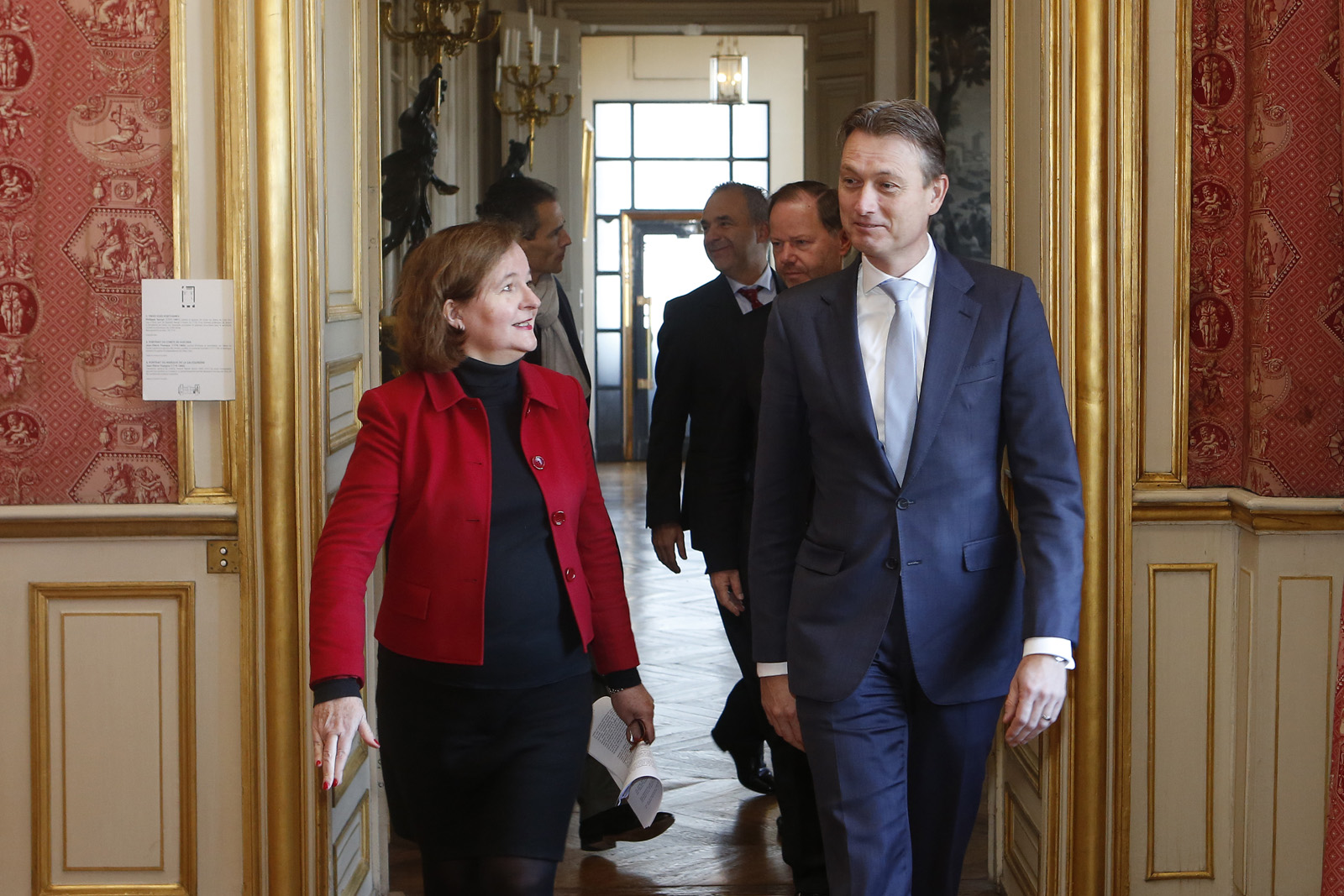
Nathalie Loiseau with Dutch Foreign Minister Halbe Zijlstra, 2017

Loiseau joined the French foreign service in 1986. She served as a diplomat in Indonesia from 1990 to 1992. She was an advisor to Foreign Minister Alain Juppé from 1993 to 1995. She later served diplomatic missions in Dakar, Senegal and Rabat, Morocco. She served as the Communications Director at the Embassy of France, Washington, D.C. from 2002 to 2007. She was the head of Human Resources at the Ministry of Foreign Affairs from 2009 to 2011, and as its chief of staff from 2011 to 2012.

Loiseau was the director of the École nationale d'administration (ENA) between 2012 and 2017.

== Political career ==
On 21 June 2017, Loiseau succeeded Marielle de Sarnez as the French Minister for European Affairs.

Loiseau has been a Member of the European Parliament since the 2019 European elections. She has since been a member of the Committee on Foreign Affairs and its Subcommittee on Security and Defence, the latter of which she chaired from 2019 to 2024. In 2020, she also joined the Special Committee on Foreign Interference in all Democratic Processes in the European Union.

In addition to her committee assignments, Loiseau is part of the Parliament's delegations for relations with the Maghreb countries and the Arab Maghreb Union; to the Parliamentary Assembly of the Union for the Mediterranean; and for relations with the NATO Parliamentary Assembly. She is also a member of the European Parliament Intergroup on Children’s Rights the European Parliament Intergroup on LGBT Rights and the MEPs Against Cancer group. Since 2021, she has been chairing the Parliament's delegation to the EU-UK Parliamentary Assembly, which provides parliamentary oversight over the implementation of the EU–UK Trade and Cooperation Agreement.

Loiseau was re-elected as an MEP following the 2024 European Parliament election. She was selected by the European Union as the chief of mission of its observation team to monitor the February 2025 Kosovan parliamentary election.

== Political positions ==
In a 2022 letter to European Commissioner for the Environment, Oceans and Fisheries Virginijus Sinkevičius, Loiseau – together with Pierre Karleskind and Stéphanie Yon-Courtin – urged the EU to take measures to end British water treatment facilities’ discharges of raw sewage into shared waters, part of what they argued was an unacceptable lowering of environmental standards since Brexit.

Also in 2022, Loiseau and Bart Groothuis wrote a letter to local officials in Strasbourg, criticizing a deal between Chinese technology company Nuctech and Strasbourg Airport to provide airport scanning systems, arguing the firm would get access to data on its travelers, including EU lawmakers.

== Recognition ==
In March 2024, Loiseau was one of twenty MEPs to be given a "Rising Star" award at The Parliament Magazine's annual MEP Awards

== Personal life ==
Loiseau is married and has four children. She is a Roman Catholic, and a feminist.

In March 2019, Loiseau posted a joke to her private Facebook page about owning a cat which she had named 'Brexit', saying that "He wakes me up every morning meowing to death because he wants to go out, and then when I open the door he stays put, undecided, and then glares at me when I put him out." The quote was reprinted by Le Journal du Dimanche, and in response to the widespread international media coverage Loiseau clarified that she does not own a cat, and her comments were intended as a joke.

== Works ==
- Loiseau, Nathalie (2014). Choisissez tout. Paris: JC Lattès. ISBN 9782709644846. OCLC 892945168.
- Loiseau, Nathalie (2017). La démocratie en BD. Paris: Casterman. ISBN 9782203132337.
