= Canton of Caen-2 =

Coordinates: 49.187°N 0.392°W

Caen-2
- Canton
- Interactive map of Caen-2
- Country: France
- Region: Normandy
- Department: Calvados
- No. of communes: {{{nbcomm}}}

Government
  - Representatives (2021–2028): Patrick Jeannenez; Marie-Christine Quertier
- Population (2023): 30,672
- INSEE code: 14 06

The canton of Caen-2 is an administrative division of the Calvados department, northwestern France. Its borders were modified at the French canton reorganisation which came into effect in March 2015. Its seat is in Caen.

== Composition ==
It consists of the following communes:

1. Authie
2. Caen (partly)
3. Carpiquet
4. Saint-Contest
5. Saint-Germain-la-Blanche-Herbe
6. Villons-les-Buissons

== Councillors ==
Election	Councillors	Party	Occupation
2015	Patrick Jeannenez	LR	Councillor of Caen
2015	Stéphanie Yon-Courtin	LR	Mayor of Saint-Contest
2021	Patrick Jeannenez	LR	Councillor of Caen
2021	Marie-Christine Quertier	DVD	Director of the Regional Cancer Screening Center

== Pictures of the canton ==
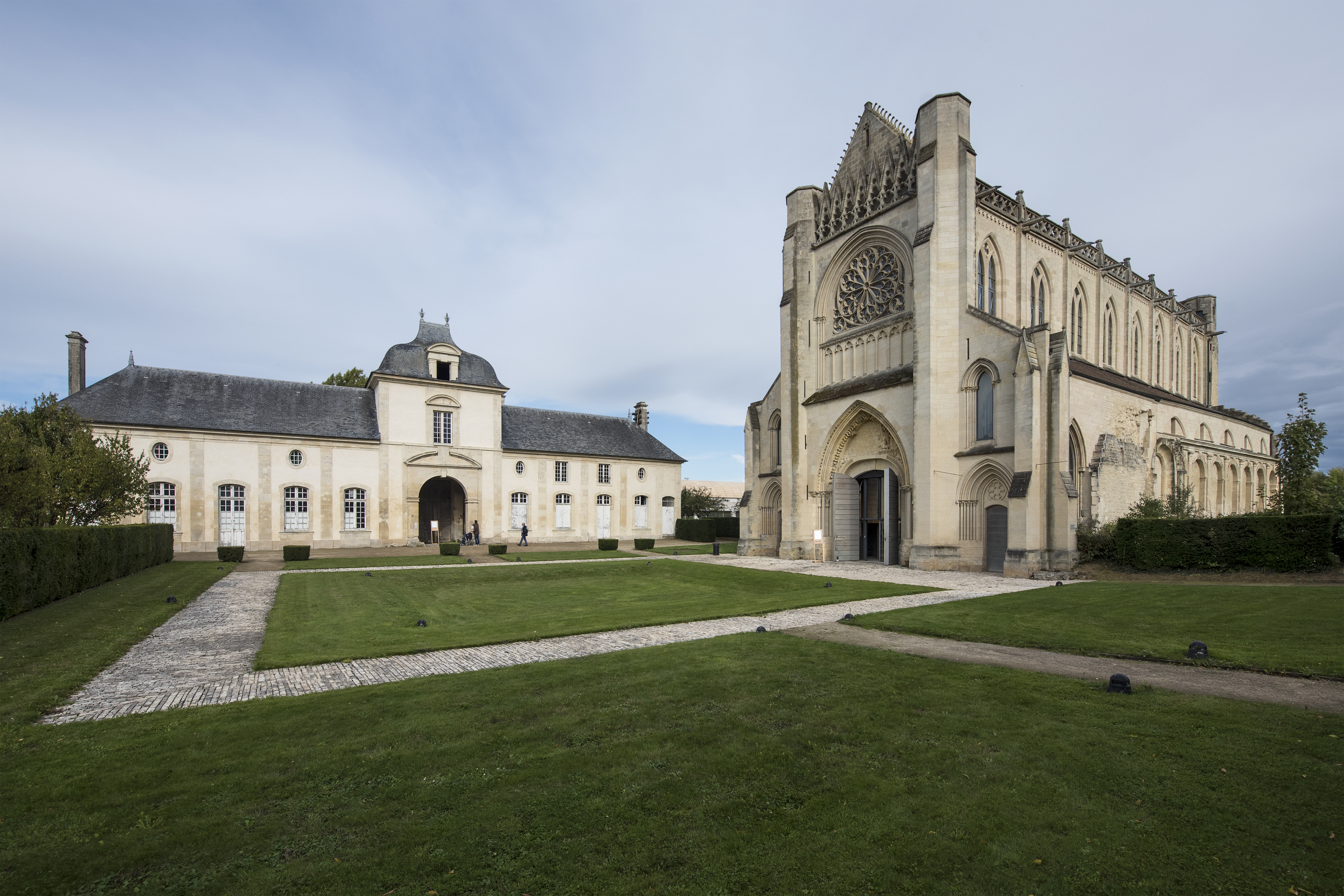
Ardenne Abbey

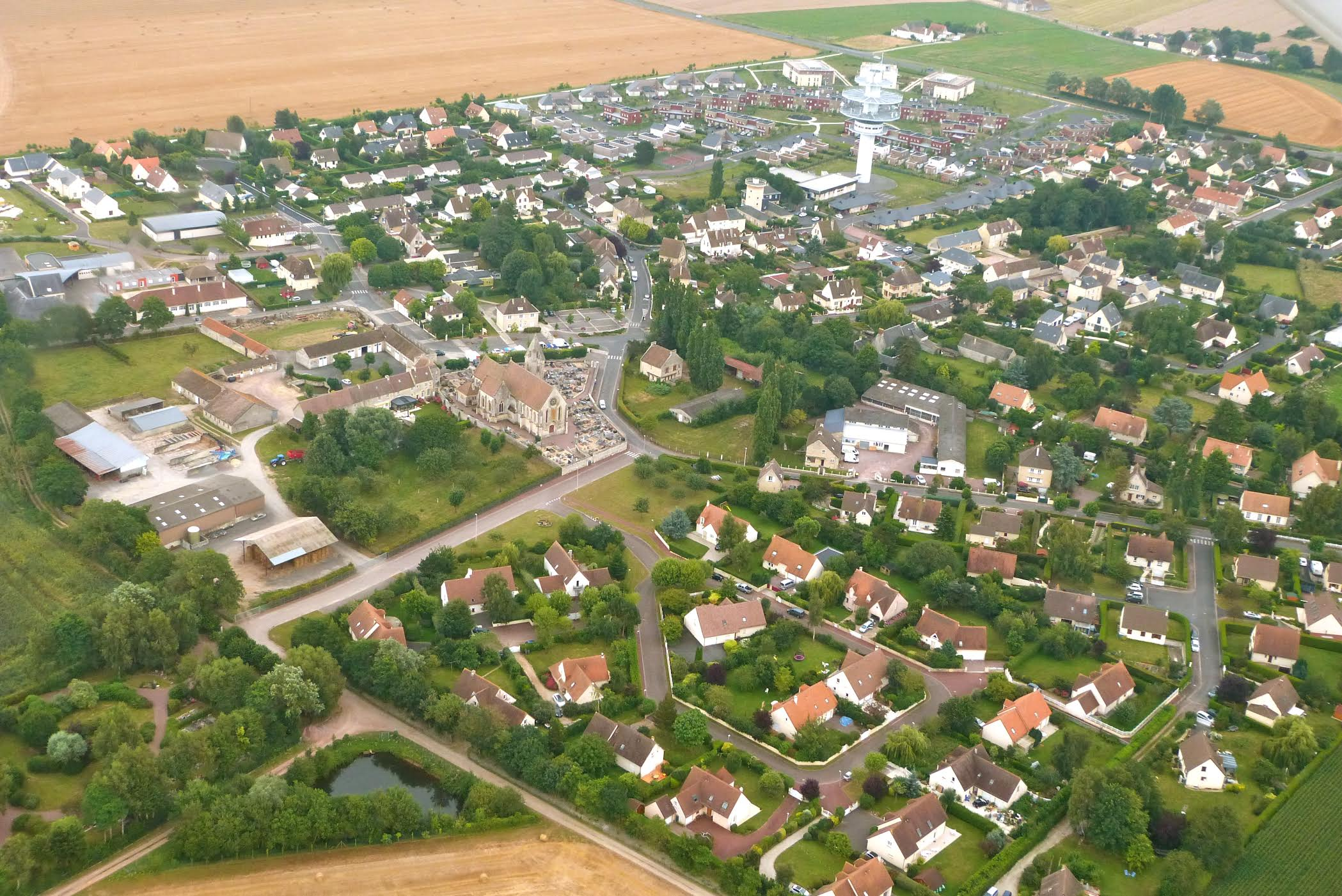
View of Saint-Contest

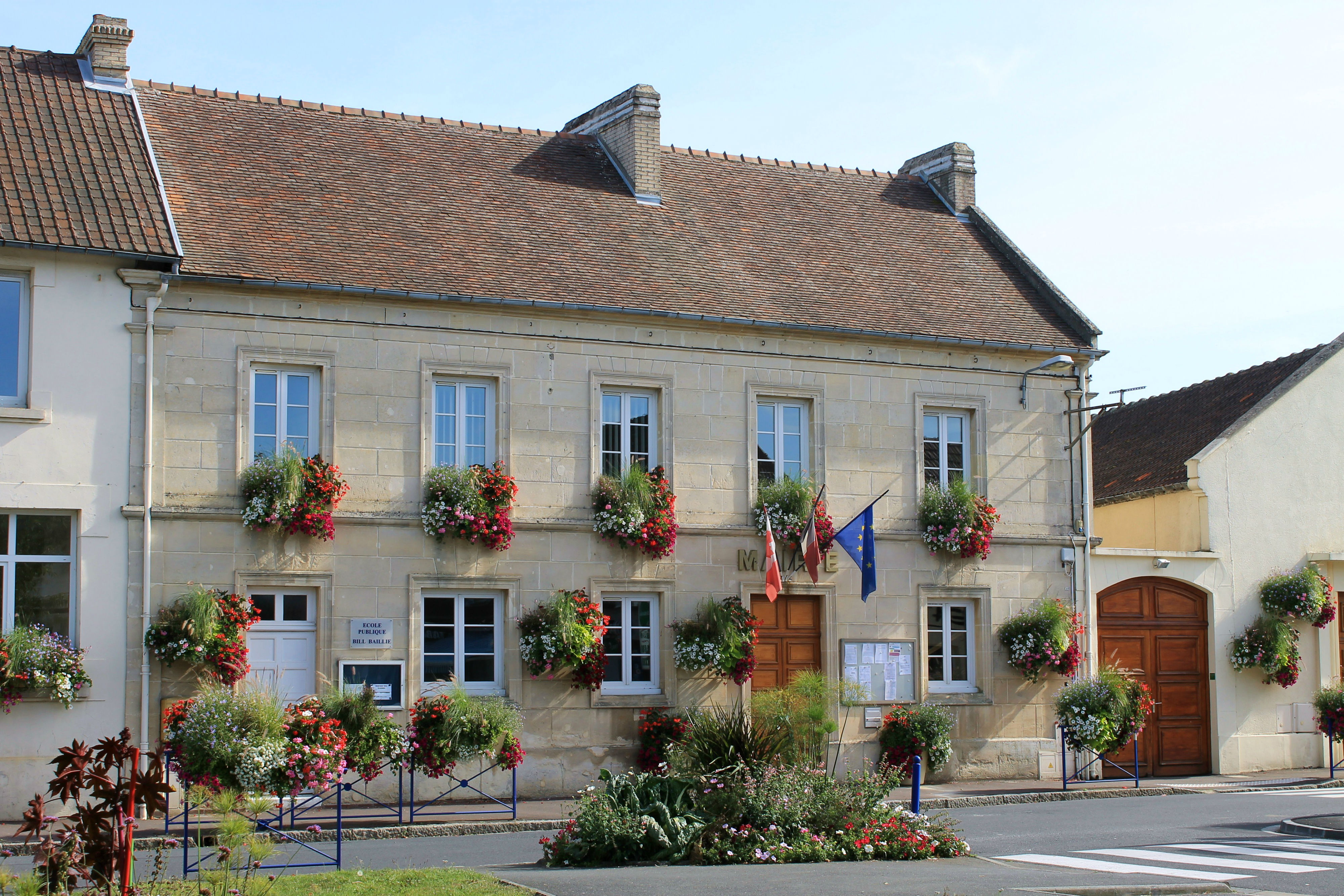
Authie' Town Hall
