= Pierre Karleskind =

French oceanographer and politician (born 1979)

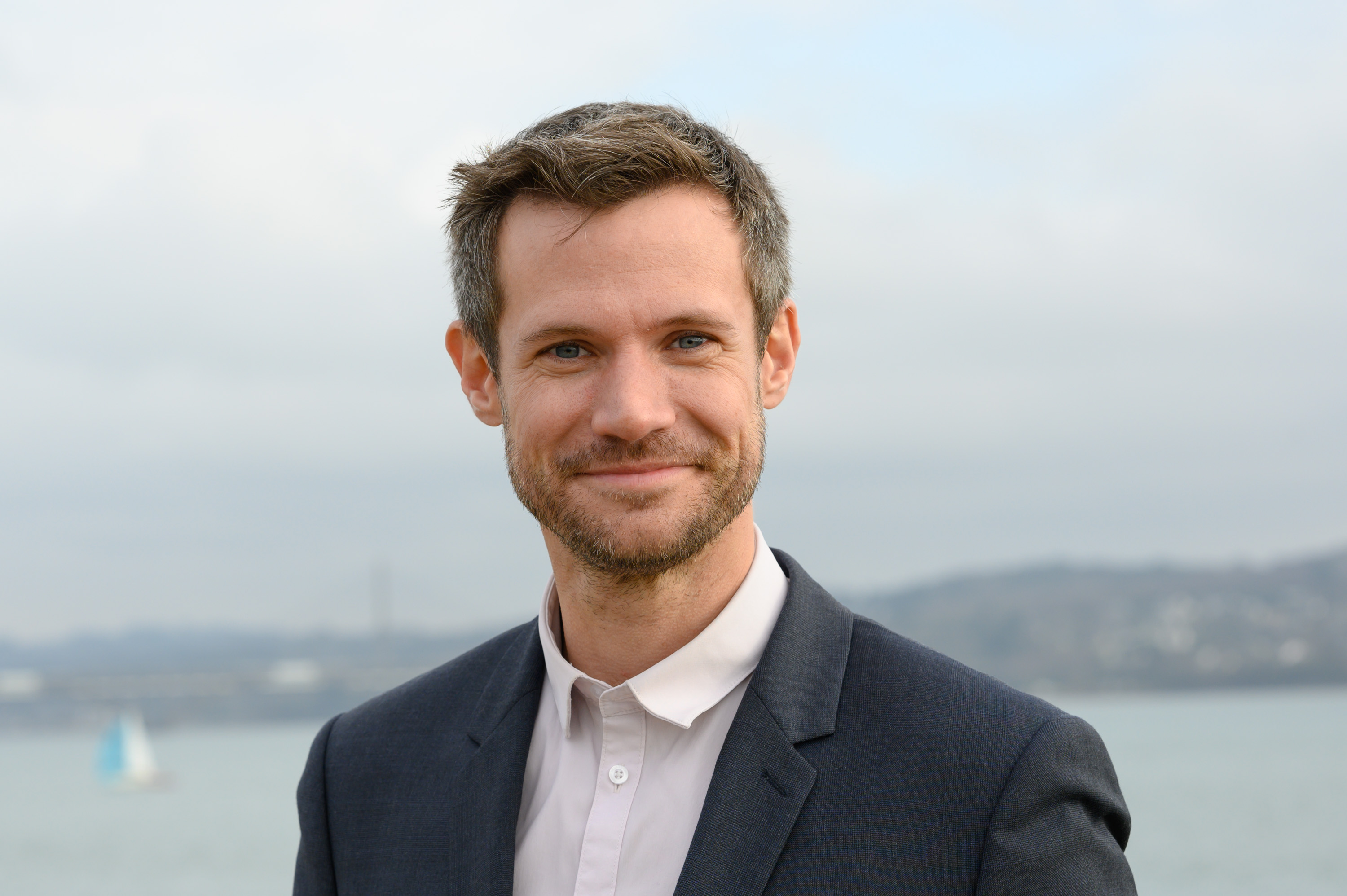

Member of the European Parliament for France
- In office 2 July 2019 – 15 July 2024

Member of the Regional Council of Brittany
- In office 17 December 2015 – 1 July 2021
- President: Loïg Chesnais-Girard

Personal details
- Born: 19 October 1979 (age 46) Melun, France
- Party: PS (2005-2016); Renaissance (since 2016)
- Education: École polytechnique ENSTA ParisTech; European University Institute of the Sea
- Profession: Oceanographer

Pierre Karleskind (born 19 October 1979) is a French oceanographer and politician of La République En Marche! (LREM) who served as a Member of the European Parliament from 2019 to 2024.

== Political career ==
In parliament, Karleskind served on the Committee on the Internal Market and Consumer Protection and as member of the Committee on Fisheries. In 2020, he became the chairman of the Committee on Fisheries.

In addition to his committee assignments, Karleskind was a member of the European Parliament Intergroup on LGBT Rights, the European Parliament Intergroup on Climate Change, Biodiversity and Sustainable Development, the European Parliament Intergroup on Seas, Rivers, Islands and Coastal Areas, and the MEPs Against Cancer group.

In March 2024, Karleskind was one of twenty MEPs to be given a "Rising Star" award at The Parliament Magazine's annual MEP Awards

== Political positions ==
Karleskind mobilised 64 MEPs to officially refer the police’s mass arrest of LGBT activists in Poland to the European Commission.

In a 2022 letter to European Commissioner for the Environment, Oceans and Fisheries Virginijus Sinkevičius, Karleskind – together with Stéphanie Yon-Courtin and Nathalie Loiseau – urged the EU to take measures to end British water treatment facilities’ discharges of raw sewage into shared waters, part of what they argued was an unacceptable lowering of environmental standards since Brexit.
