= Authie =

Authie is the name of several places in France:

- Authie, Calvados, commune of the Calvados département
- Authie, Somme, commune of the Somme département
- Authie (river), a river in northern France
