= Directorate-General for Agriculture and Rural Development =

The Directorate-General for Agriculture and Rural Development (DG AGRI) is a Directorate-General of the European Commission. The DG AGRI is responsible for the European Union policy area of agriculture and rural development. The work of the DG AGRI is closely linked with the Common Agricultural Policy (CAP). In 2020 it had 851 employees.

The Director-General (since April 2020 - until May 2025) was Wolfgang Burtscher, with Mihail Dumitru serving as Deputy DG.

Christophe Hansen was appointed European Commissioner for Agriculture and Rural Development in the first von der Leyen Commission in 2024.

== Mission ==
The mission statement of DG Agri is closely linked to the Common Agricultural Policy (CAP). The DG's current concrete concerns include :

- Managing and developing the CAP
- Reinforcing rural development policy as the "second pillar of the CAP"
- Safeguarding the European model of agriculture
- Conducting the enlargement process

== Leadership and staff ==
The Directorate-General for Agriculture and Rural Development has a staff of about 1000 people.

=== Commissioner ===
The European Commissioner for Agriculture and Rural Development have been

- Phil Hogan (2014–2019)
- Janusz Wojciechowski (2019–2024)
- Christophe Hansen (2024-)

=== Directors General ===
- José Manuel Silva Rodríguez (1999–2005)
- Jean-Luc Demarty (2005–2010)
- José Manuel Silva Rodríguez (2010–2013)
- Jerzy Bogdan Plewa (2013–2019)
- María Angeles Benítez Salas (2020, acting)
- Wolfgang Burtscher (2020–2025)
- Mihail Dumitru (2025, acting)

== Structure ==
The DG AGRI encompasses 12 Directorates, all headquartered in Brussels:

- A: International Affairs I, (in particular WTO negotiations)
- B: International Affairs II, (in particular enlargement)
- C: Economics of Agricultural Markets and single CMO
- D: Direct Support, Market Measures, Promotion
- E: Rural Development Programmes I
- F: Rural Development Programmes II (SAPARD)
- G: Horizontal Aspects of Rural Development
- H: Sustainability and quality of agriculture and rural development
- I: Internal Resource Management
- J: Audit of Agricultural Expenditure
- K: Relations with other Institutions; Communication and Documentation
- L: Economic Analyses, Perspectives and Evaluation
- M: Agricultural Legislation

== See also ==
- European Commissioner for Agriculture
- Common Agricultural Policy
- Agriculture and Fisheries Council (Council of the European Union)
- Directorate-General for Agriculture, Fisheries, Social Affairs and Health
- European Parliament Committee on Agriculture and Rural Development
