= Carpiquet =

- Commune
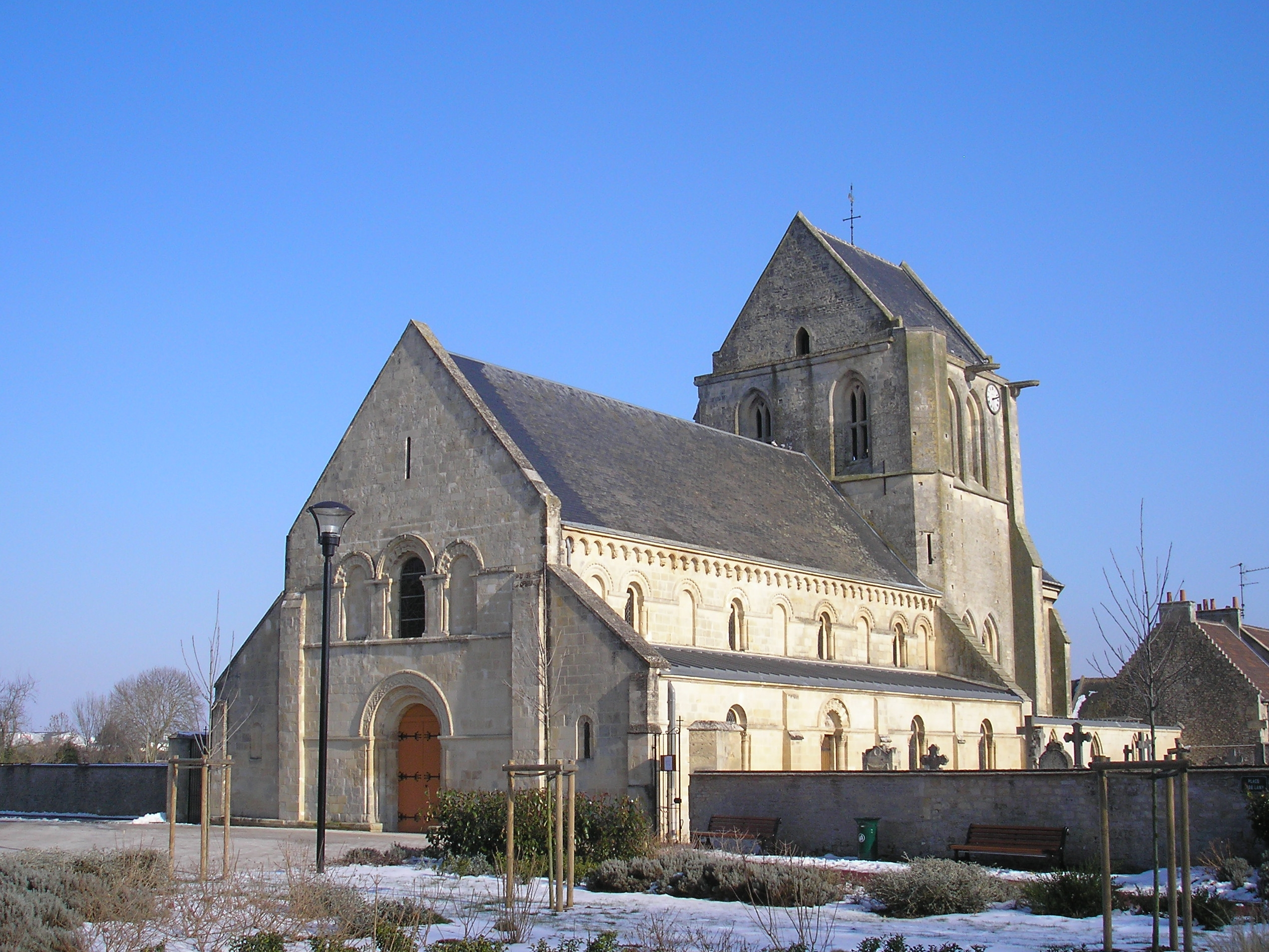
- The church in Carpiquet
- Location of Carpiquet
- Location within France Location within Normandy
- Coordinates: 49°11′11″N 0°26′36″W
- Country: France
- Region: Normandy
- Department: Calvados
- Arrondissement: Caen
- Canton: Caen-2
- Intercommunality: CU Caen la Mer

Government
  - Mayor (2020–2026): Pascal Sérard
- Area^{1}: 5.88 km^{2} (2.27 sq mi)
- Elevation: 64 m (210 ft)
- Highest elevation: 74 m (243 ft)
- Lowest elevation: 45 m (148 ft)
- Population (2023): 3,428
  - Density: 583/km^{2} (1,510/sq mi)
- Time zone: UTC+01:00 (CET)
  - Summer (DST): UTC+02:00 (CEST)
- INSEE/Postal code: 14137 /14650
- ^{1} French Land Register data, which excludes lakes, ponds, glaciers > 1 km^{2} (0.386 sq mi or 247 acres) and river estuaries.

Carpiquet (French pronunciation: [kaʁpikɛ]) is a commune in the Calvados department in the Normandy region in northwestern France. Caen – Carpiquet Airport is located in Carpiquet.

== Geography ==
Carpiquet is on the western side of the Caen metropolitan area. The town is divided into four distinct areas:

- the town centre;
- the commercial area along the Ligne de Paris - Caen and Route nationale 13 to the north;
- the Bellevue area to the east;
- the Caen - Carpiquet Airport to the west.

== History ==
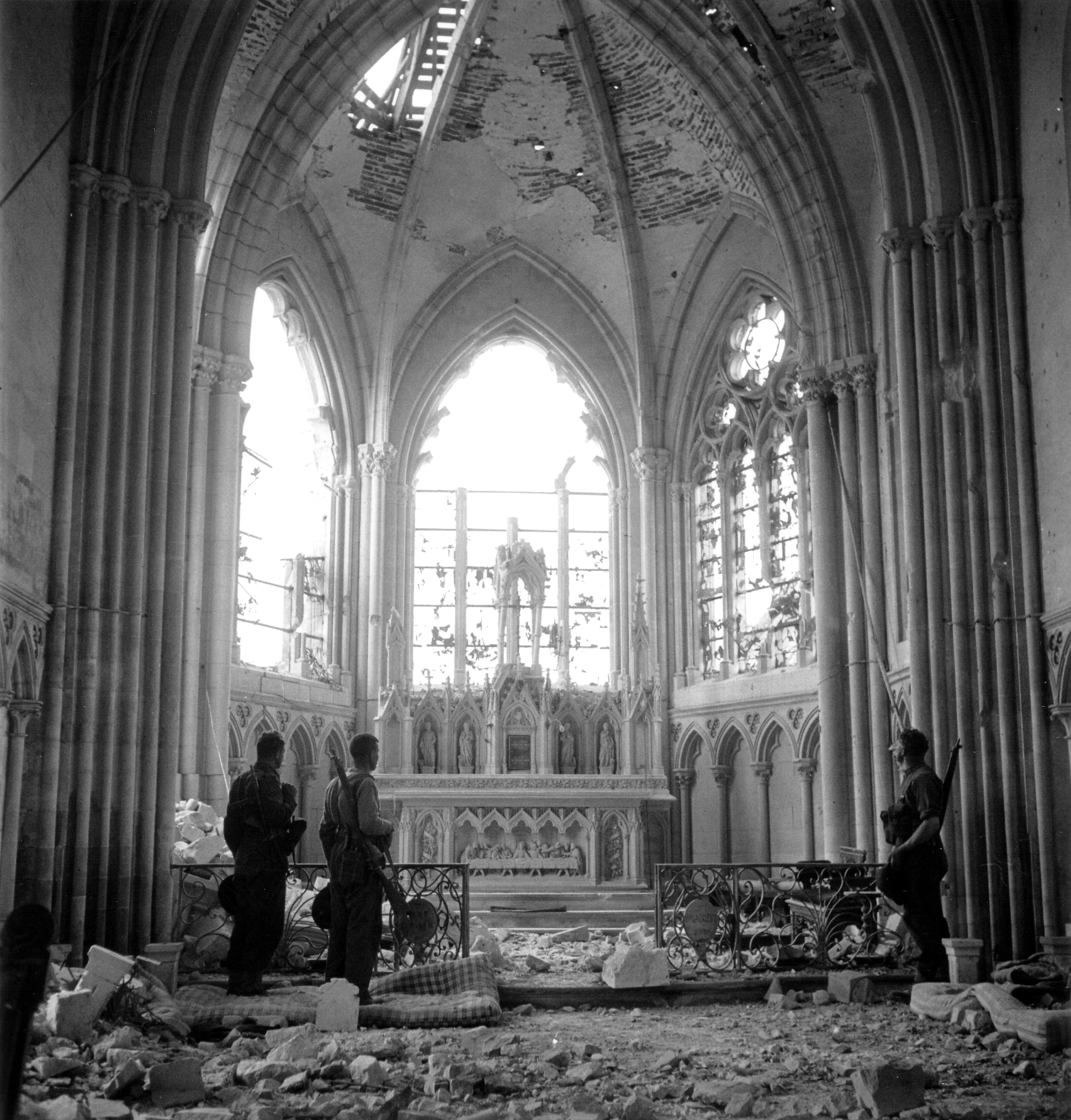
Unidentified Canadian Infantry in the bombed out Medieval Eglise St. Martin in Carpiquet, near Caen, July 12, 1944. Photo: Ken Bell

The Carpiquet Airport was one of the objectives of the 3rd Canadian Infantry Division during the Normandy Campaign. The village was fought over between June and July 1944 in several battles with the 12th SS Panzer Division Hitlerjugend and 1st SS Panzer Division Leibstandarte SS Adolf Hitler, notably during the Battle for Caen. It and the airport were finally taken in early July during Operation Windsor.

== Population ==
Historical population
Year	Pop.	±% p.a.
1968	1,315	—
1975	1,207	−1.22%
1982	1,650	+4.57%
1990	1,519	−1.03%
1999	1,861	+2.28%
2007	2,140	+1.76%
2012	2,387	+2.21%
2017	2,607	+1.78%
2023	3,428	+4.67%
Source: INSEE

== Points of interest ==
=== National heritage sites ===
The Commune has two buildings and areas listed as a Monument historique

- Église Saint-Martin 12th century church listed as a monument in 1927.
- Double entrance door remains of a 14th century door way.

== Economy ==
Chalair Aviation, an airline, has its head office on the grounds of Caen – Carpiquet Airport in Carpiquet.

== Sport ==
Carpiquet has a swimming pool, the aquatic center Sirena, which has a 25metre pool and features such as waterslides.

== Twin towns – sister cities ==
Carpiquet is twinned with the following:

- Waigolshausen, Germany since 2018
- North Baddesley, England since 1993 - shared with the commune of Authie
- Miramichi, Canada since 2022

== See also ==
- Communes of the Calvados department
