= Authie, Calvados =

Authie
- Commune
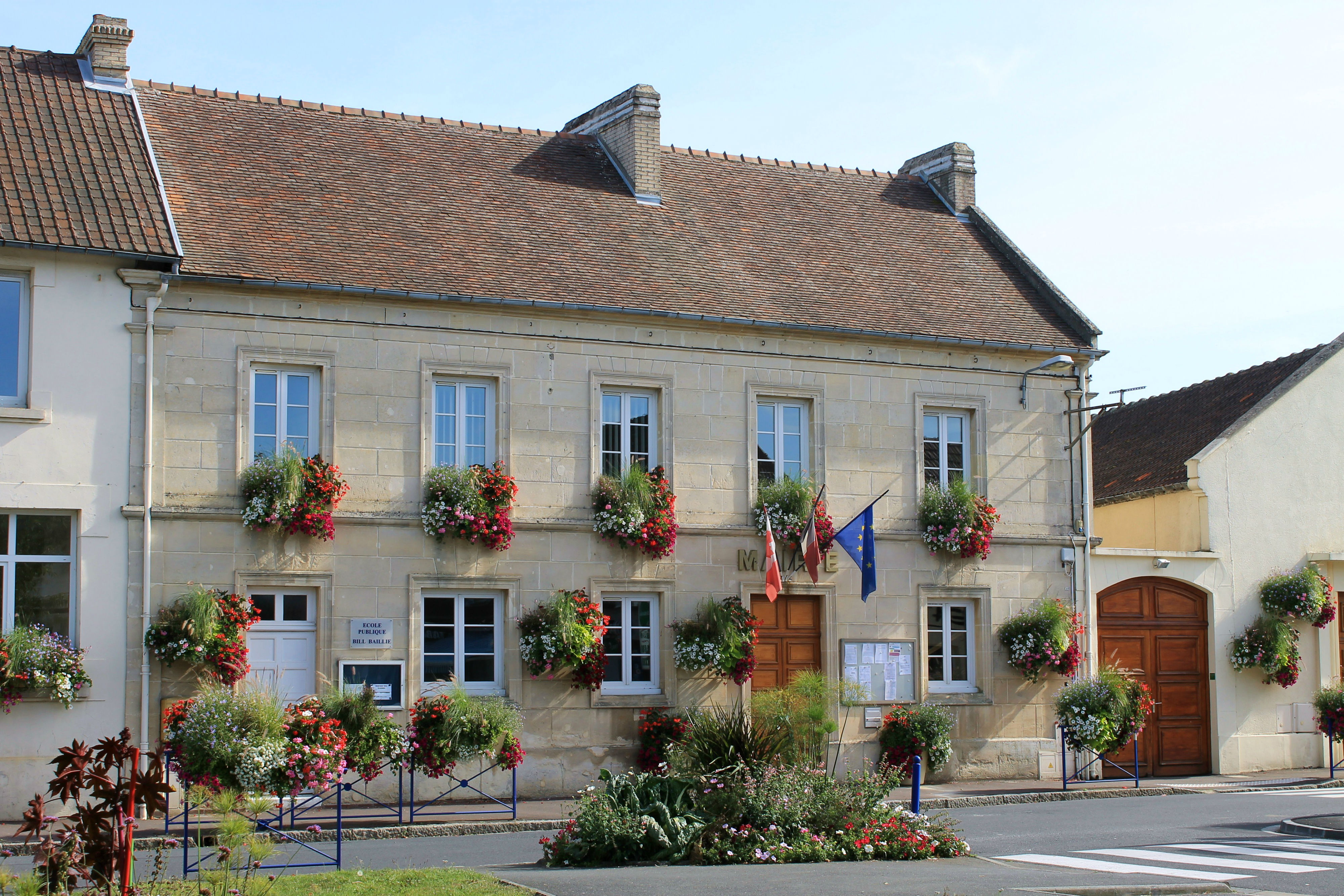
- Authie Town Hall
- Location of Authie
- Location within France Location within Normandy
- Coordinates: 49°12′24″N 0°25′50″W
- Country: France
- Region: Normandy
- Department: Calvados
- Arrondissement: Caen
- Canton: Caen-2
- Intercommunality: CU Caen Mer

Government
  - Mayor (2020–2026): Olivier Simar
- Area^{1}: 3.21 km^{2} (1.24 sq mi)
- Elevation: 65 m (213 ft)
- Highest elevation: 73 m (240 ft)
- Lowest elevation: 60 m (200 ft)
- Population (2023): 1,707
  - Density: 532/km^{2} (1,380/sq mi)
- Time zone: UTC+01:00 (CET)
  - Summer (DST): UTC+02:00 (CEST)
- INSEE/Postal code: 14030 /14280
- ^{1} French Land Register data, which excludes lakes, ponds, glaciers > 1 km^{2} (0.386 sq mi or 247 acres) and river estuaries.

Authie (French pronunciation: [oti]) is a commune in the Calvados department in the Normandy region of north-western France.

The commune has been awarded one flower by the National Council of Towns and Villages in Bloom in the Competition of cities and villages in Bloom.

== Geography ==
Authie is located some 6 km (4 mi) north-west of the centre of Caen. Access to the commune is by road D220 from Villons-les-Buissons in the north-east which passes through the centre of the commune and the village and continues to Carpiquet in the south. The D220C also goes south-east from the village to the urban area of Caen. There are also the hamlets of Hameau de Saint-Louet, Franqueville, Fermie du Calvaire, and Cussy in the commune. Apart from the large residential area the commune is entirely farmland.

== Toponymy ==
The name of the town is attested in the forms Alteium in 1227 and Auteya in 1264.

Albert Dauzat matched Authie with Authie in Somme department (Altegiam 830) on the coastal river Authie (Alteia 723) and considers it primarily as a hydronym but does not provide any further explanation.

According to René Lepelley this toponym is based on the pre-Celtic element alt in an unknown sense and is close to Authou in Pont-Authou.

François de Beaurepaire sees a Gallic (Celtic) element in the alt in Authou.

The Gallic term Attegia was recognized by Xavier Delamarre in Atheist-type names - e.g. Athis in the sense of "cabin or hut".

This analyses to ad- (pre-verb) and tegia meaning "house" (cf. Old Irish teg, old Welsh tig, Welsh Ty, Old Breton tig, and Breton ti all meaning "house").

It is likely that Authie contains the same element tegia preceded by another prefix. From a phonetic point of view there is a palatalization of the intervocalic consonant where [g] becomes [j] and then an Amuïssement or attenuation of [j]>[∅], a recurrent phenomenon in phonetics.

The same author explains that Arthies (Artegiae 680) may come from *Are-tegia which is a possible solution for Authie, knowing that [r] regularly becomes [l] before a consonant.

The name Altavilla is either a medieval romanization of a place named Hauteville as in Hauteville in Manche department and therefore does not relate to Authie. It may be a scribal error for *Alteia Villa or *Villa Alteia which mentions a villa, i.e. a rural area in medieval Latin, in a place called Alteia which is Authie.

== History ==
In 1832 Authie (466 inhabitants in 1831) absorbed Saint-Louet-près-Authie (9 people) in the west of its territory.

The commune was liberated on 8 June 1944 but was largely destroyed in the bombing.

== Administration ==
List of Successive Mayors

From	To	Name
1983	2020	Joël Pizy
2020	2026	Olivier Simar

=== Twinning ===
Authie has twinning associations with:

- North Baddesley (United Kingdom) since 1993. It is shared with the commune of Carpiquet.

== Demography ==
The inhabitants of the commune are known as Althavillais or Althavillaises in French.

Historical population

Year	Pop.	±% p.a.
1793	650	—
1821	571	−0.46%
1846	630	+0.39%
1872	434	−1.42%
1901	361	−0.63%
1926	294	−0.82%
1946	202	−1.86%
1954	348	+7.04%
1962	414	+2.19%

Year	Pop.	±% p.a.
1968	514	+3.67%
1975	571	+1.51%
1982	645	+1.76%
1990	780	+2.40%
1999	983	+2.60%
2007	1,349	+4.04%
2012	1,487	+1.97%
2017	1,595	+1.41%
2023	1,707	+1.14%

Source: EHESS and INSEE

== Culture and heritage ==
=== Civil heritage ===
The commune has one site that is registered as an historical monument:

- An Ornamental Garden in the Château of Authie (18th century)
- The Monument to the Canadians dedicated to the victims of the taking of the village in 1944

=== Religious heritage ===
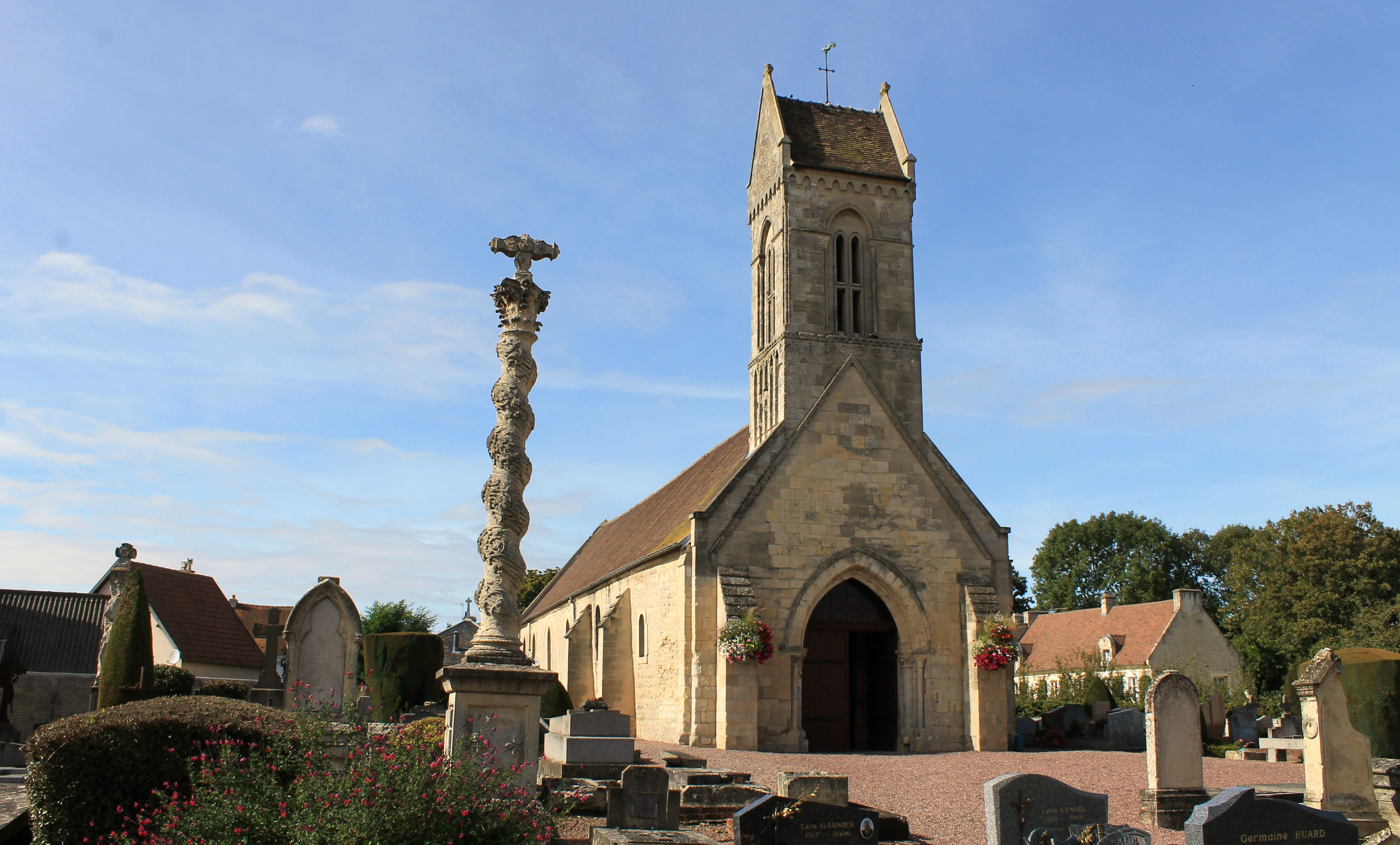
The Church of Saint Vigor

The commune has two religious buildings and structures that are registered as historical monuments:

- The Church of Saint Vigor (12th century)
- A Cemetery Cross (18th century)

The Church contains one item that is registered as an historical object:

- A Bronze Bell (1704)
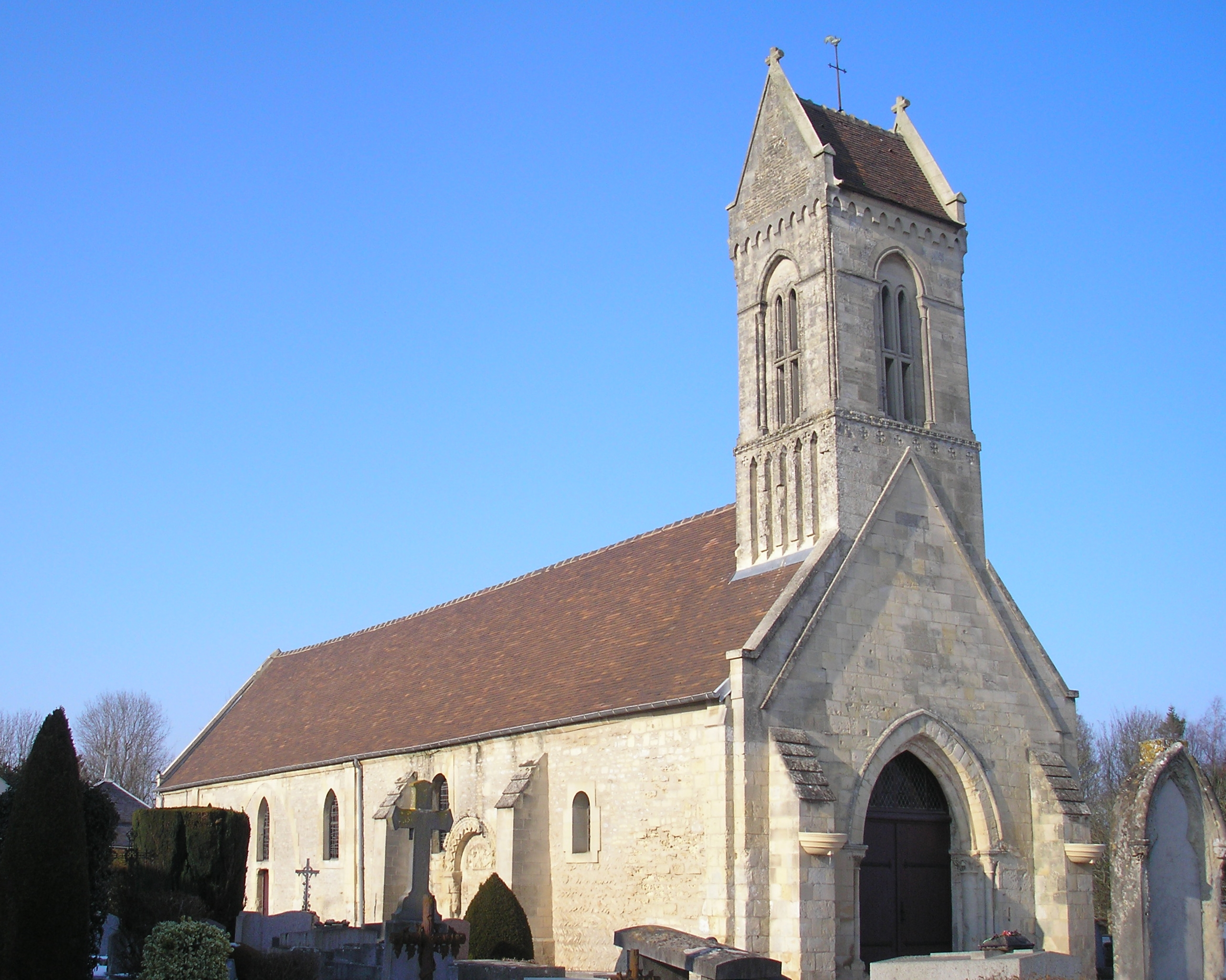
Saint Vigor church

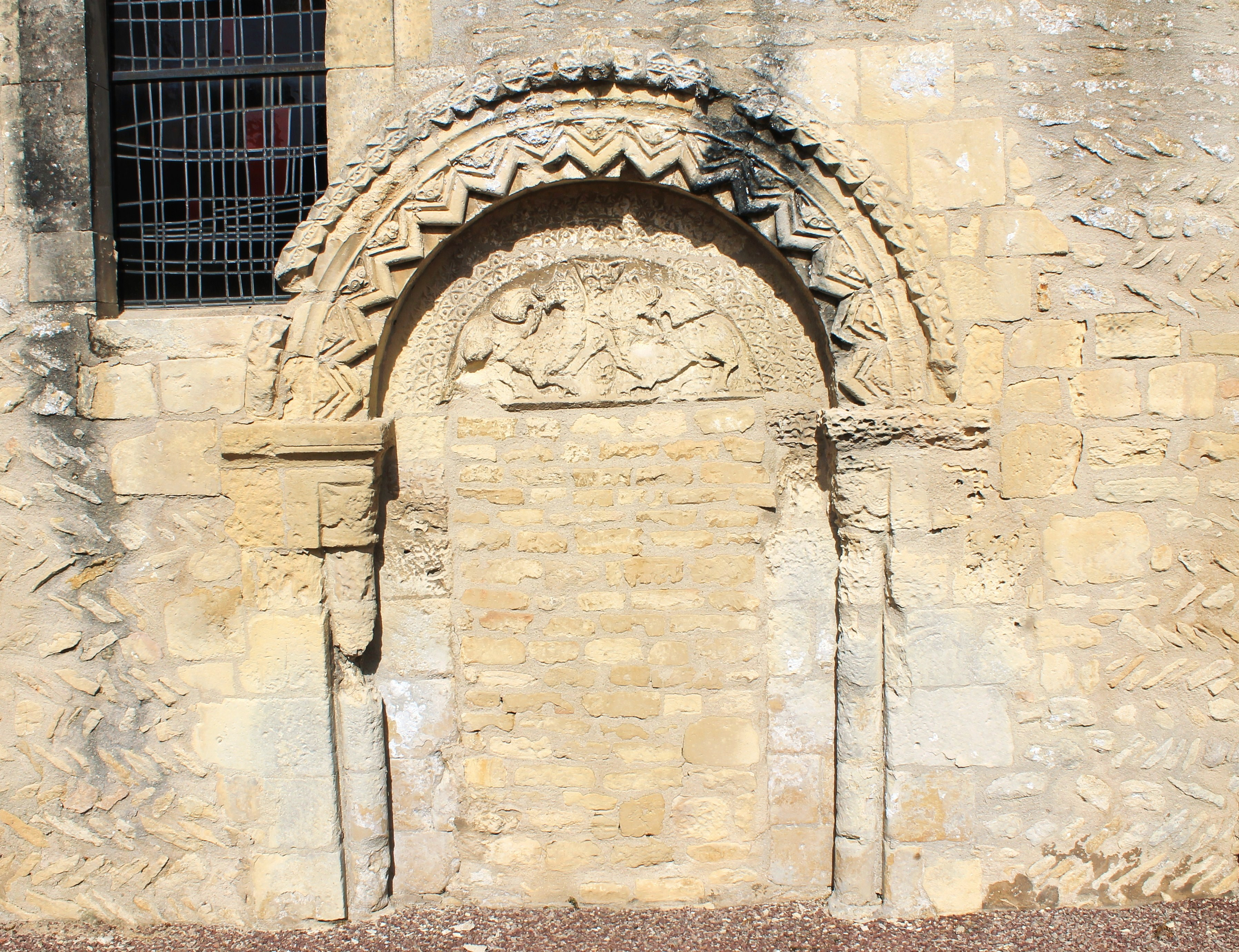
Saint-Vigor Portal

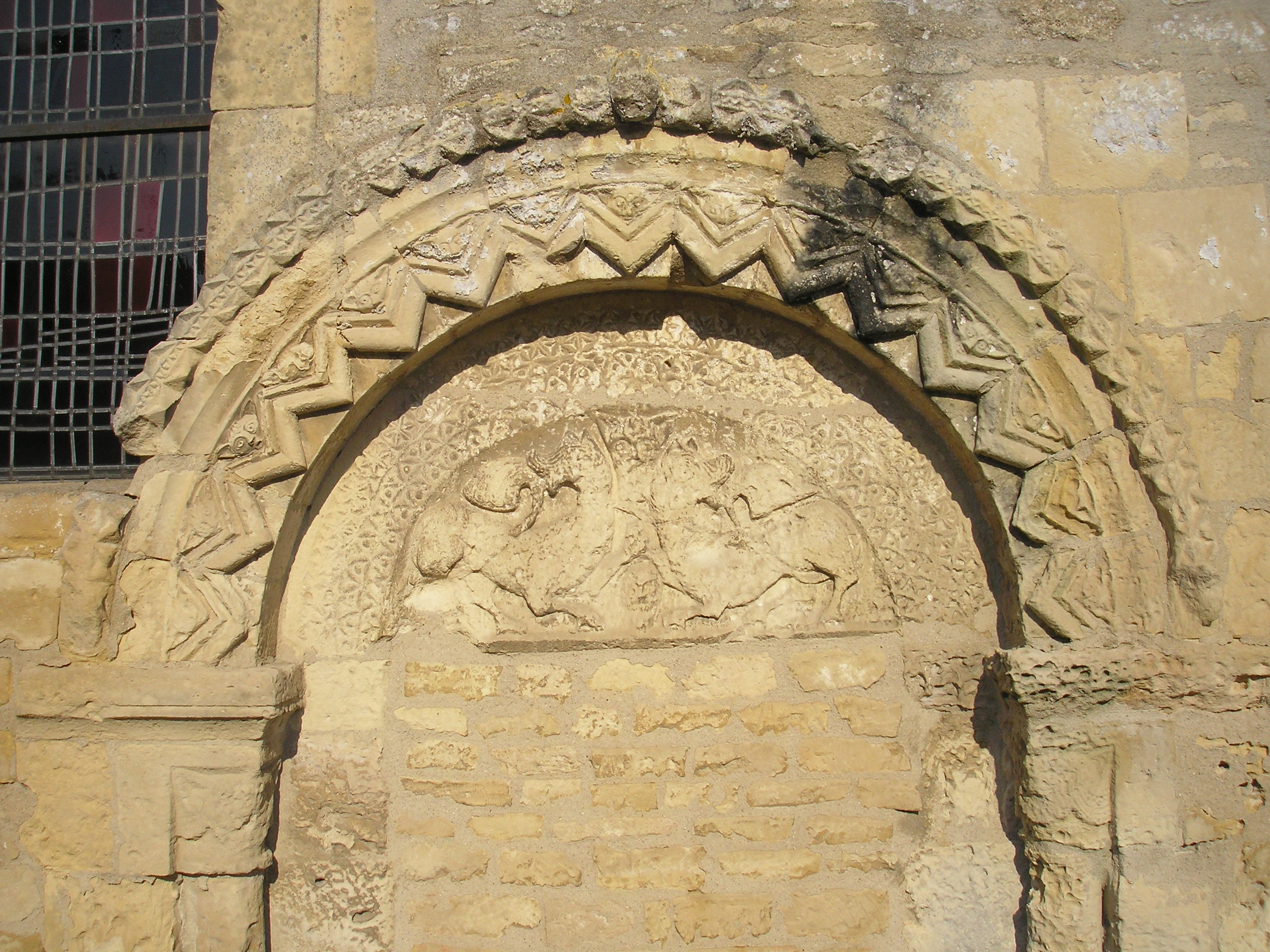
Detail on the Portal

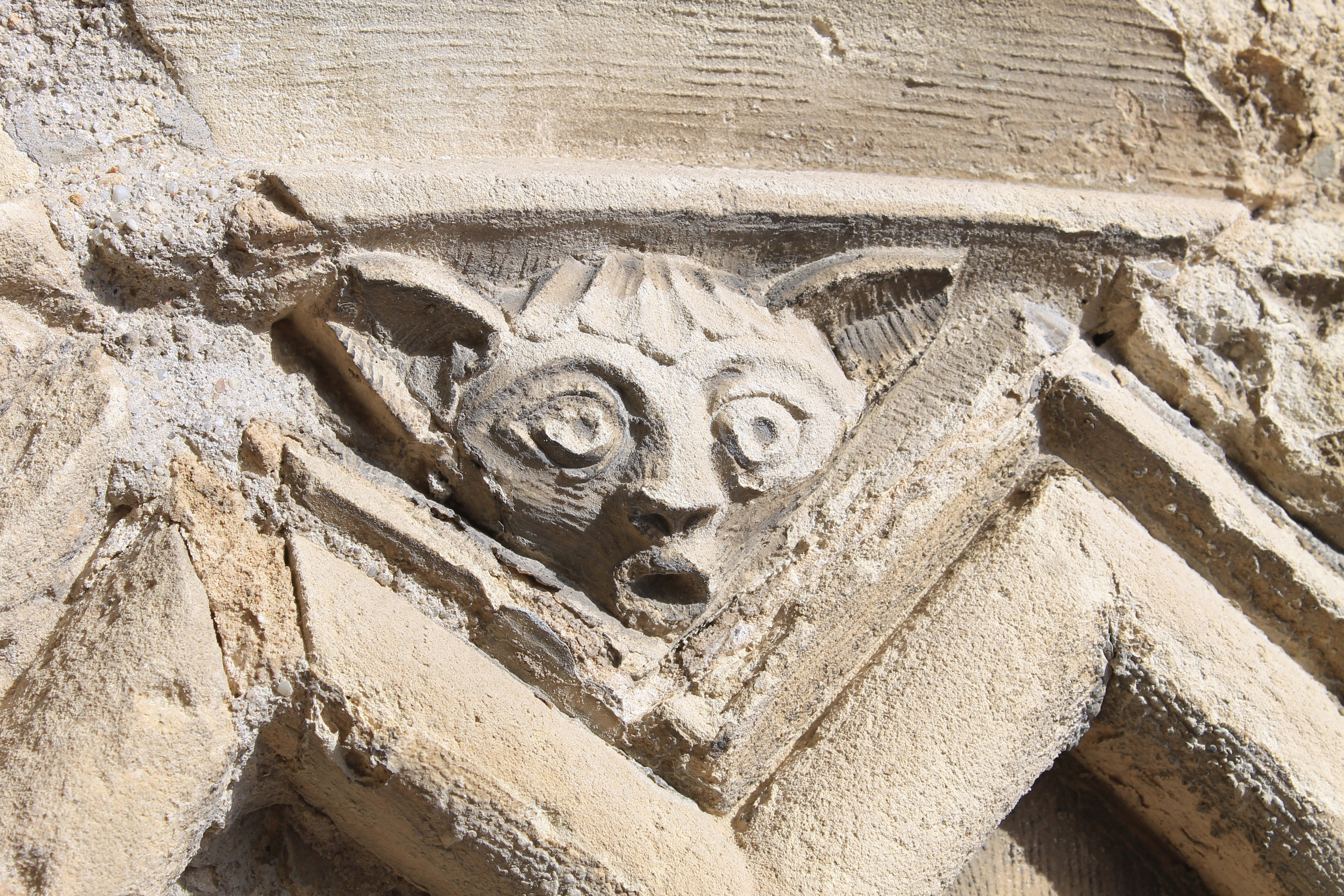
A detail on the church

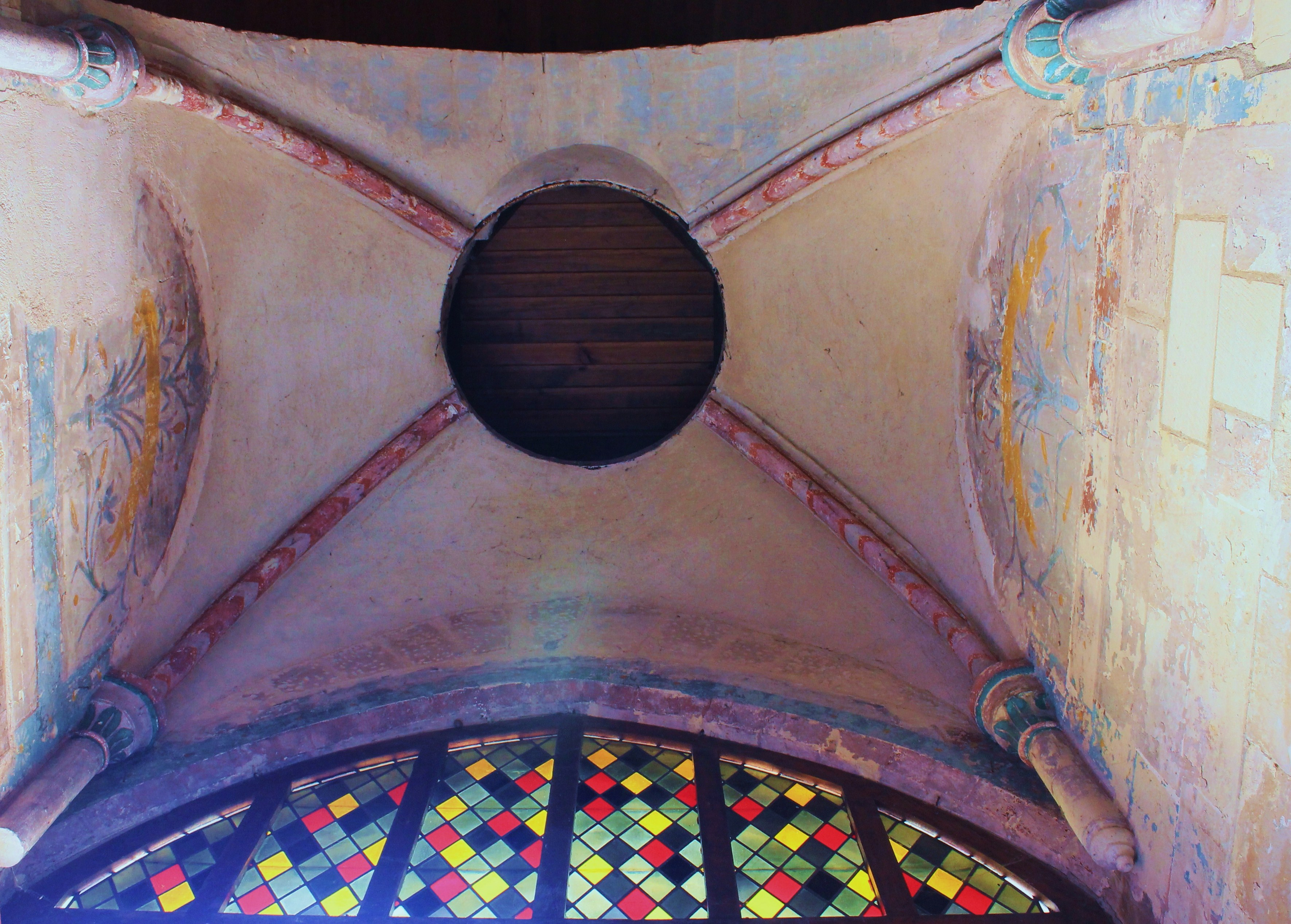
The Vault in the church

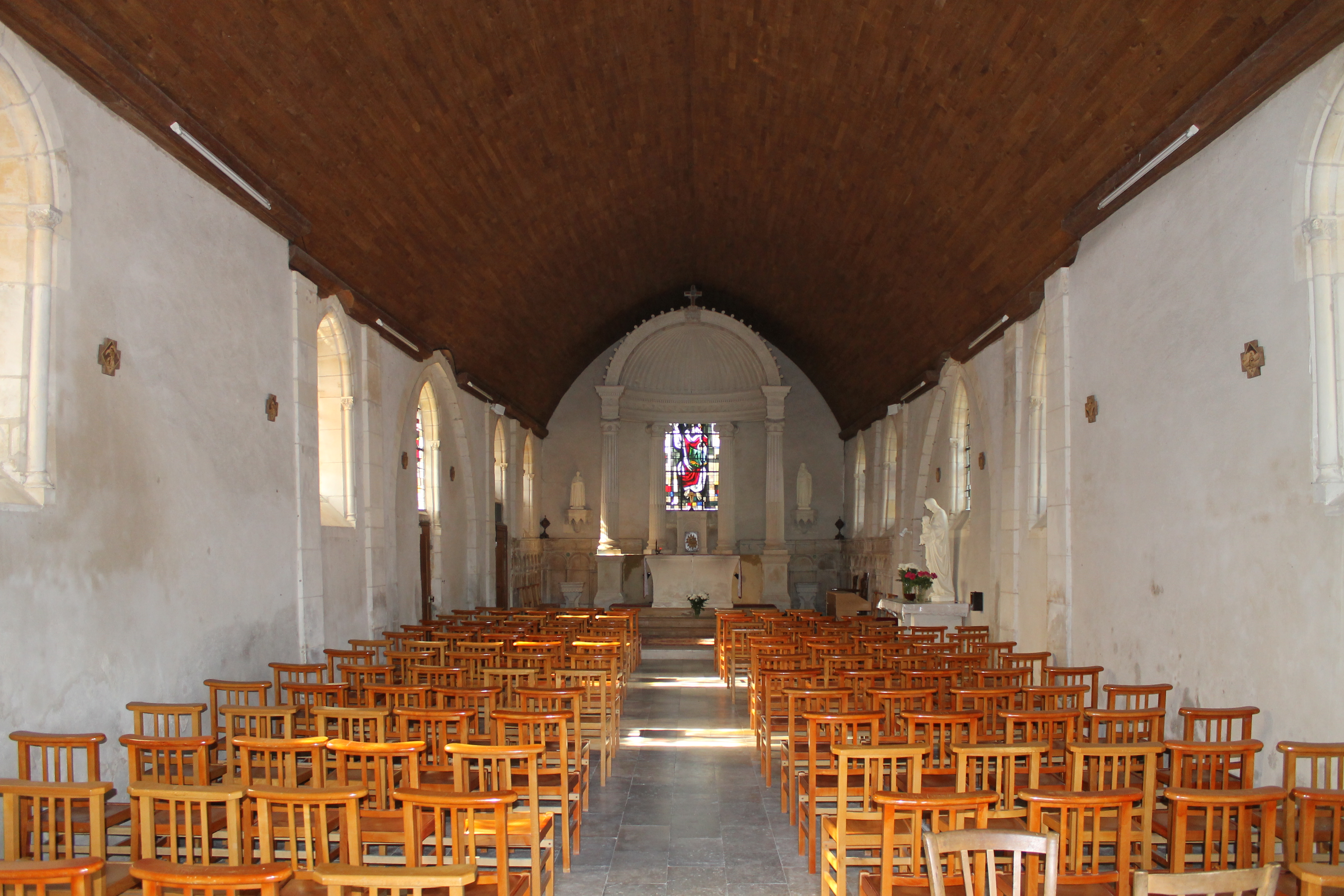
The Nave of the church

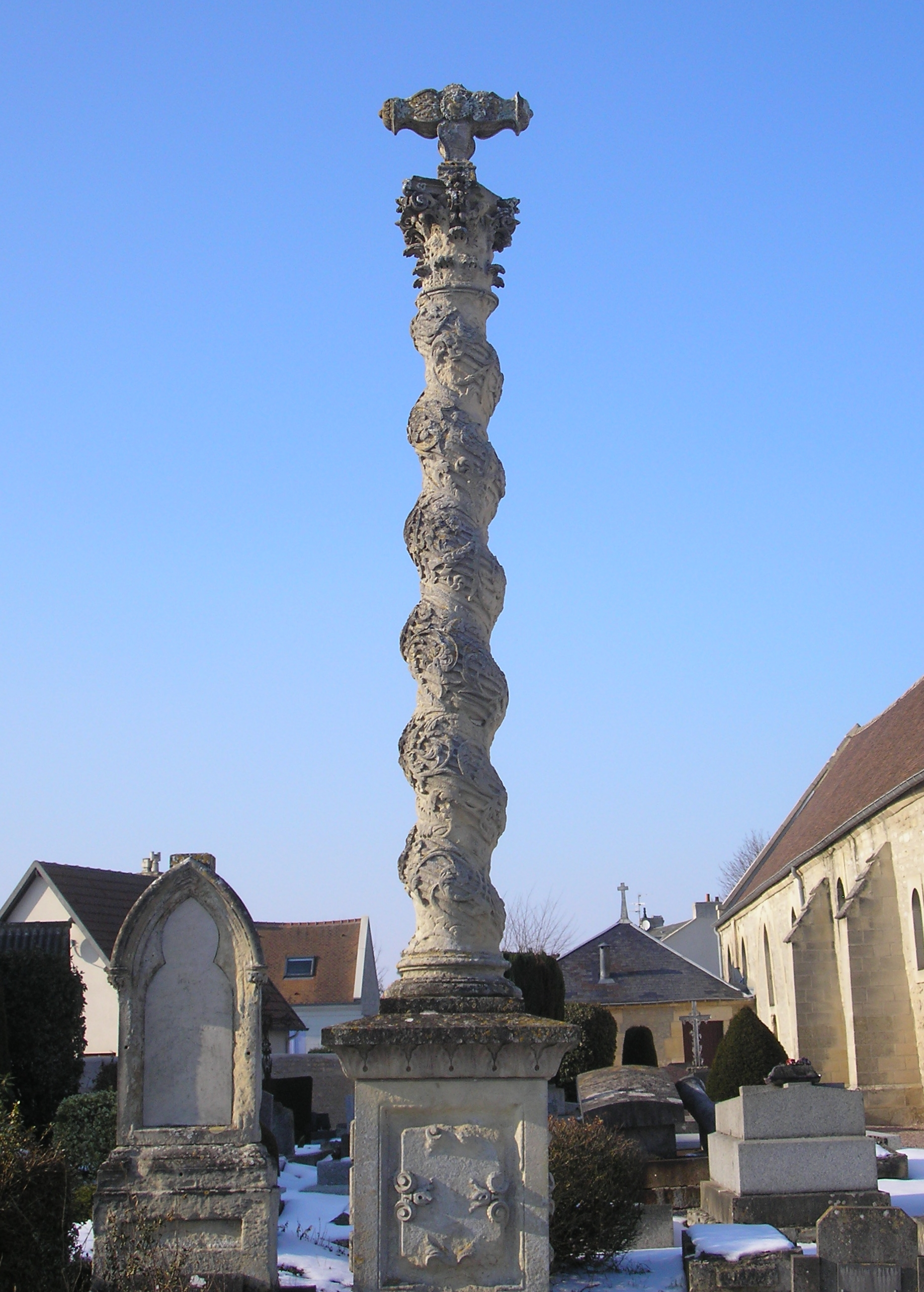
The Cemetery Cross

== See also ==
- Communes of the Calvados department

=== External links ===
- Authie on Géoportail, National Geographic Institute (IGN) website (in French)
- Authie on the 1750 Cassini Map
