= Bernard Boucault =

French public official

- Preceded by: Marielle de Sarnez

Director of the École nationale d'administration
- In office 2007 – 3 October 2012
- Preceded by: Nathalie Loiseau

Personal details
- Born: 17 July 1948 (age 77)

Bernard Boucault (born 17 July 1948) is a French public official. He was previously director of the École nationale d'administration. He was head of the Paris police from 2012 until 2015. He has been involved in several high-profile police actions, involving protestors in 2013 and the Football Championship of France concerning Paris Saint-Germain F.C. in 2013.

== Personal life ==
Boucault was attacked in 2014. In 2016, several French government officials were banned from Wikipedia for attempting to modify his biography.

== Awards ==
- France: Commander of the Legion of Honour (31 December 2012)
- France: Officer of the National Order of Merit (15 November 1997)
- Mexico: Plaque rank of the Order of the Aztec Eagle (26 September 2016)
