= Directorate-General for Maritime Affairs and Fisheries =

The Directorate-General for Maritime Affairs and Fisheries (DG MARE) is a Directorate-General of the European Commission, responsible for the policy area of fisheries, the Law of the Sea and Maritime Affairs of the European Union. The current director-general is Charlina Vitcheva.

In 2020 it had 308 employees.

== Mission ==
The mission of DG MARE is to:

- ensure that the ocean resources are used sustainably and that coastal communities and the fishing sector have a prosperous future
- promote maritime policies and stimulate a sustainable blue economy
- promote ocean governance at international level

== Structure ==
The DG MARE encompasses 5 Directorates, all headquartered in Brussels:

- A: Maritime Policy & Blue Economy
- B: International Ocean Governance & Sustainable Fisheries
- C: Fisheries Policy Atlantic, North Sea, Baltic & Outermost Regions
- D: Fisheries Policy Mediterranean & Black Sea
- E: General Affairs & Resources

== See also ==
- European Commissioner for Environment, Oceans and Fisheries
- Common Fisheries Policy
- Agriculture and Fisheries Council (Council of the European Union)
  - Directorate-General for Agriculture, Fisheries, Social Affairs and Health
- European Parliament Committee on Fisheries
- European Fisheries Control Agency
