= European Parliament Committee on Fisheries =

European Parliament committee

Committee on Fisheries
- Abbreviation: PECH
- Type: Standing committee
- Legislature: European Parliament
- Parliamentary term: 10th European Parliament
- Chair: Carmen Crespo Díaz; EPP, Spain
- Vice-Chairs: Paulo do Nascimento Cabral (EPP); Giuseppe Milazzo (ECR); Stéphanie Yon-Courtin (Renew); Jessica Polfjärd (EPP)
- Members: 27
- Political composition: EPP: 7 · S&D: 5 · ECR: 4 · Renew: 3 · PfE: 3 · Greens/EFA: 2 · The Left: 2 · ESN: 1
- Jurisdiction: Common fisheries policy, conservation of marine resources, fisheries management, aquaculture, seafood markets and international fisheries agreements
- Counterpart: Agriculture and Fisheries Council
- Website: Official website

The Committee on Fisheries (PECH) is a standing committee of the European Parliament. It is responsible for the Common Fisheries Policy, the conservation and management of marine biological resources, fisheries and aquaculture, the market in fishery and aquaculture products, and the European Union's international fisheries agreements.

The committee examines legislation affecting fishing fleets, coastal communities, seafood markets and marine ecosystems. Its work seeks to reconcile the environmental sustainability of fish stocks with the economic and social viability of the fisheries and aquaculture sectors.

== Responsibilities ==
The committee is responsible for the operation, development and management of the Common Fisheries Policy. Its remit includes conservation measures, the management of fisheries and fishing fleets, marine and applied fisheries research, aquaculture, seafood markets and the financial instruments supporting the sector.

Its responsibilities include:

- the operation and development of the Common Fisheries Policy;
- the conservation of fishery resources and the sustainable management of fish stocks;
- management of fishing fleets and measures affecting fishing capacity;
- marine and applied fisheries research;
- the common organisation of the market in fishery and aquaculture products;
- processing, marketing, traceability and labelling of seafood products;
- structural policy in the fisheries and aquaculture sectors;
- implementation of the European Maritime, Fisheries and Aquaculture Fund;
- the integrated maritime policy insofar as it concerns fishing activities;
- sustainable fisheries partnership agreements with non-EU countries;
- relations with regional fisheries management organisations; and
- implementation of international obligations in the field of fisheries.

The committee also scrutinises the European Commission and EU agencies involved in fisheries management, particularly the European Fisheries Control Agency.

== Common Fisheries Policy ==
The Common Fisheries Policy provides the main legal framework for EU fisheries management. Its objectives include ensuring that fishing and aquaculture activities are environmentally sustainable over the long term while also producing economic, social and employment benefits and contributing to food supplies.

The committee plays a central role in legislation concerning fishing opportunities, technical conservation measures, control and enforcement, fisheries data, fleet policy and the reform of the Common Fisheries Policy. It also considers the effects of climate change, invasive species, fuel prices, generational renewal and competition from imported seafood on the sector.

== International fisheries policy ==
The European Union participates in regional fisheries management organisations and concludes sustainable fisheries partnership agreements with non-EU countries. These agreements provide EU vessels with regulated access to fisheries resources while including financial support for fisheries governance and development in partner countries.

PECH considers such agreements under the consent procedure and follows the EU's implementation of international fisheries obligations.

== Chairs ==
The following table lists the chairs of the committee since 1997.

Name	Political group	Member state	Took office	Left office
Carmen Fraga Estévez	EPP	Spain	1997	1999
Daniel Varela Suanzes-Carpegna	EPP–ED	Spain	1999	2002
Struan Stevenson	EPP–ED	United Kingdom	2002	2004
Philippe Morillon	ALDE	France	2004	2009
Carmen Fraga Estévez	EPP	Spain	2009	2012
Gabriel Mato	EPP	Spain	2012	2014
Alain Cadec	EPP	France	2014	2019
Chris Davies	Renew Europe	United Kingdom	2019	2020
Pierre Karleskind	Renew Europe	France	2020	2024
Carmen Crespo Díaz	EPP	Spain	2024	Incumbent

== Members ==
=== 10th Parliament, 2024–2029 ===
The committee currently has 27 full members. Its current composition is shown below, with the chair and vice-chairs indicated in italics.

European People's Party	Progressive Alliance of Socialists and Democrats	European Conservatives and Reformists	Renew Europe
Carmen Crespo Díaz, Spain, Chair; Paulo do Nascimento Cabral, Portugal, Vice-Chair; Jessica Polfjärd, Sweden, Vice-Chair; Niclas Herbst, Germany; Isabelle Le Callennec, France; Francisco José Millán Mon, Spain; Željana Zovko, Croatia	Sakis Arnaoutoglou, Greece; Thomas Bajada, Malta; André Franqueira Rodrigues, Portugal; Nicolás González Casares, Spain; Giuseppe Lupo, Italy	Giuseppe Milazzo, Italy, Vice-Chair; Stephen Nikola Bartulica, Croatia; Nora Junco García, Spain; Bert-Jan Ruissen, Netherlands	Stéphanie Yon-Courtin, France, Vice-Chair; Asger Christensen, Denmark; Emma Wiesner, Sweden
Patriots for Europe	Greens–European Free Alliance	The Left	Europe of Sovereign Nations
Ton Diepeveen, Netherlands; France Jamet, France; António Tânger Corrêa, Portugal	Isabella Lövin, Sweden; Ana Miranda Paz, Spain	Emma Fourreau, France; Anja Hazekamp, Netherlands	Siegbert Frank Droese, Germany

==== Substitute members ====
Substitute members of the 10th Parliament (click “show” to expand)

The committee's substitute members are listed below.

European People's Party	Progressive Alliance of Socialists and Democrats	European Conservatives and Reformists	Renew Europe
Magdalena Adamowicz, Poland; Bartosz Arłukowicz, Poland; Fredis Beleris, Greece; Marco Falcone, Italy; Willemien Koning, Netherlands; Susana Solís Pérez, Spain; Javier Zarzalejos, Spain	Sofie Eriksson, Sweden; Sérgio Gonçalves, Portugal; Idoia Mendia, Spain; Eric Sargiacomo, France	Carlo Ciccioli, Italy; Piotr Müller, Poland; Sander Smit, Netherlands; Kristoffer Storm, Denmark	Oihane Agirregoitia Martínez, Spain; Karin Karlsbro, Sweden; Michal Wiezik, Slovakia
Patriots for Europe	Greens–European Free Alliance	The Left	Europe of Sovereign Nations
Anna Maria Cisint, Italy; Csaba Dömötör, Hungary; Séverine Werbrouck, France	Mélissa Camara, France; Rasmus Nordqvist, Denmark	Sebastian Everding, Germany; Luke Ming Flanagan, Ireland	Volker Schnurrbusch, Germany

== Research support ==
The committee is supported by the European Parliament's Policy Department for Structural and Cohesion Policies. It provides studies, briefings and analyses on fisheries management, aquaculture, seafood markets, marine ecosystems, international fisheries agreements and the social and economic conditions of coastal communities.

Research prepared for the committee is published through the Parliament's supporting-analyses database and the European Parliament Think Tank.

== See also ==
- Common Fisheries Policy
- European Maritime, Fisheries and Aquaculture Fund
- European Fisheries Control Agency
- European Commissioner for Fisheries and Oceans
- Directorate-General for Maritime Affairs and Fisheries
- Agriculture and Fisheries Council
- Regional fisheries management organisation
- European Fishery MLS
