= Saint-Contest =

- Commune
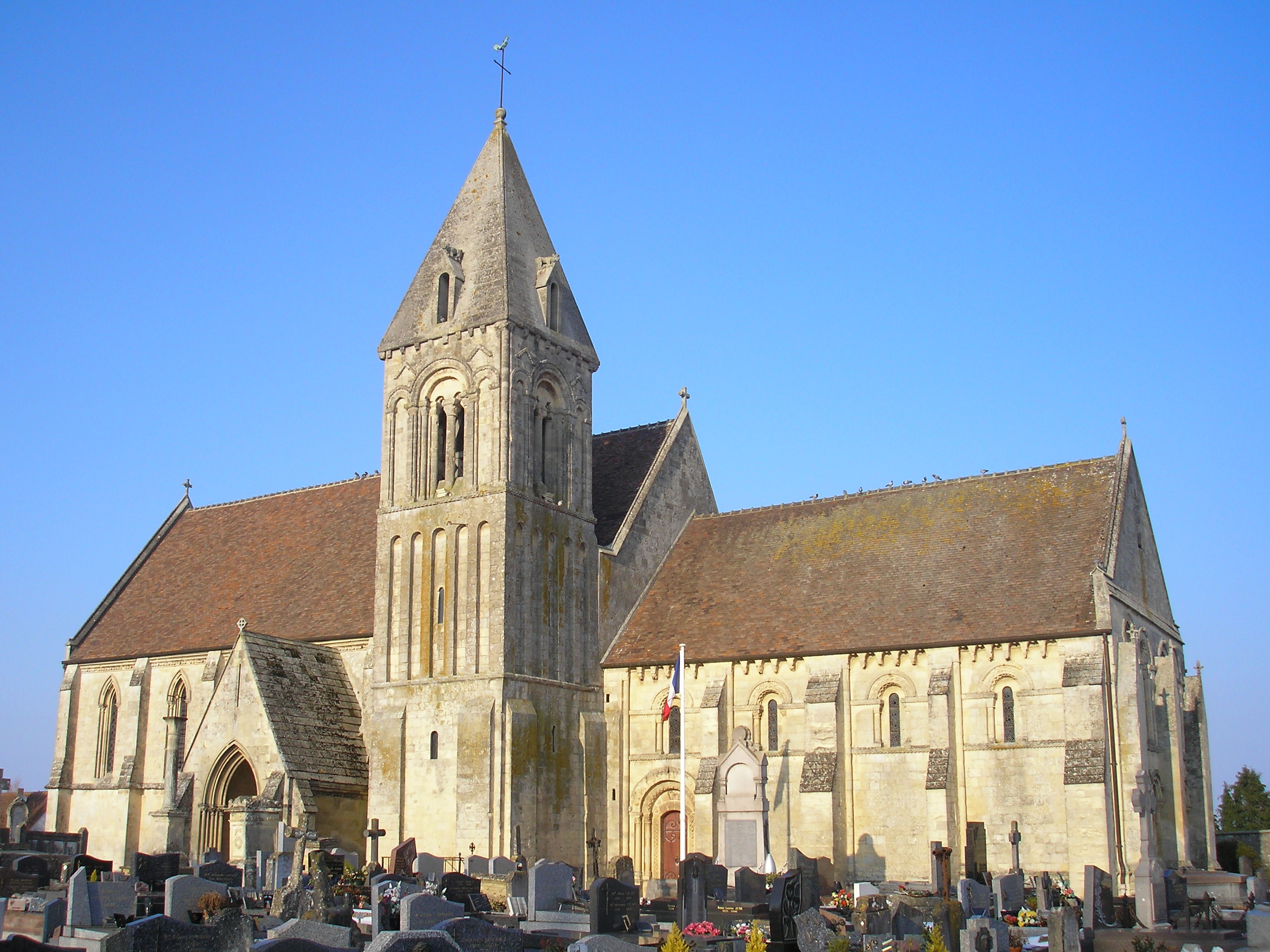
- Church of Saint-Contest
- Location of Saint-Contest
- Location within France Location within Normandy
- Coordinates: 49°12′52″N 0°24′01″W
- Country: France
- Region: Normandy
- Department: Calvados
- Arrondissement: Caen
- Canton: Caen-2
- Intercommunality: Caen la Mer

Government
  - Mayor (2020–2026): Jean-Marc Philippe
- Area^{1}: 8.05 km^{2} (3.11 sq mi)
- Elevation: 77 m (253 ft)
- Highest elevation: 77 m (253 ft)
- Lowest elevation: 54 m (177 ft)
- Population (2023): 2,465
  - Density: 306/km^{2} (793/sq mi)
- Time zone: UTC+01:00 (CET)
  - Summer (DST): UTC+02:00 (CEST)
- INSEE/Postal code: 14566 /14280
- ^{1} French Land Register data, which excludes lakes, ponds, glaciers > 1 km^{2} (0.386 sq mi or 247 acres) and river estuaries.

Saint-Contest (French pronunciation: [sɛ̃ kɔ̃tɛ]) is a commune in the Calvados department in the Normandy region in northwestern France.

== History ==
Excavations at the Clos de Bitot site in 1984 uncovered four Gaulish kilns and evidence of domestic animal use, particularly dogs. Additionally, a Roman villa was identified through aerial photography in 1987, suggesting significant historical occupation.

The name Saint-Contest is derived from Saint Contest, who served as the Bishop of Bayeux between 480 and 513. The local church, dating back to the 11th century, was granted to the Abbey of Ardenne in 1207 by Gautier d'Aignaux, the then lord of Saint-Contest.

The commune was a strategic point during Operation Charnwood in July 1944, leading to extensive damage and loss of life.

== Population ==
Historical population

Year	Pop.	±% p.a.
1793	455	—
1800	455	+0.00%
1806	868	+11.37%
1821	890	+0.17%
1831	897	+0.08%
1836	926	+0.64%
1841	955	+0.62%
1846	933	−0.47%
1851	894	−0.85%
1856	885	−0.20%
1861	840	−1.04%
1866	857	+0.40%
1872	757	−2.05%
1876	711	−1.56%
1881	707	−0.11%
1886	683	−0.69%
1891	660	−0.68%
1896	567	−2.99%
1901	503	−2.37%

Year	Pop.	±% p.a.
1906	493	−0.40%
1911	457	−1.51%
1921	431	−0.58%
1926	462	+1.40%
1931	504	+1.76%
1936	558	+2.06%
1946	418	−2.85%
1954	573	+4.02%
1962	647	+1.53%
1968	766	+2.85%
1975	810	+0.80%
1982	1,100	+4.47%
1990	1,541	+4.30%
1999	1,989	+2.88%
2007	2,351	+2.11%
2012	2,493	+1.18%
2017	2,517	+0.19%
2023	2,465	−0.35%

Source: EHESS and INSEE (1968-2023)

== Administration ==
=== Mayors of Saint-Contest ===
From	To	Name	Party
2001	2008	Michel Charpentier	Independent
2008	2014	Denis Desynder	Independent
2014	2020	Stéphanie Yon-Courtin	DVD

== International relations ==
Saint-Contest is twinned with:

- Marchwood, near Southampton, Hampshire, United Kingdom.

== Notable people ==
- François-Dominique Barberie de Saint-Contest (1701–1754): Marquis of Saint-Contest and Minister of Foreign Affairs from 1751 to 1754.

== See also ==
- Buron
- Communes of the Calvados department
