= Agriculture and Fisheries Council =

Configuration of the Council of the European Union

The Agriculture and Fisheries Council (AGRIFISH) is one of the configurations of the Council of the European Union and is composed of the agriculture and fisheries ministers of the 27 European Union member states. Its competencies include the Common Agricultural Policy (CAP) and the Common Fisheries Policy (CFP), among others.

== Composition ==
Agrifish is composed of the agriculture and fisheries ministers of the 27 European Union member states. While most member states send one minister for both sectors, others send one minister for agriculture and another for fisheries.

The European Commissioner for Agriculture and Rural Development and the European Commissioner for Maritime Affairs and Fisheries also participate in the meetings.

== Tasks ==
The agriculture part of the Council covers legislation relating to:

- the Common Agricultural Policy (CAP);
- internal market rules;
- forestry;
- organic production;
- quality of production and food and feed safety; and
- harmonisation of rules concerning veterinary matters, animal welfare, plant health, animal feed, seeds and pesticides.

The fisheries part of the Council covers legislation relating to:

- the Common Fisheries Policy (CFP);
- fisheries;
- the setting of annual Total Allowable Catches (TACs);
- quotas for each species; and
- fishing effort limits.

== Legislative procedure ==
Since the entry into force of the Lisbon Treaty, the Council takes its decisions on most agriculture and fisheries legislation in co-decision with the European Parliament according to the ordinary legislative procedure, except with respect to decisions on annual fishing opportunities where the Council decides on its own.

== Administration ==
The work and tasks of the Council concerning agriculture is prepared by the Special Committee on Agriculture (SCA), composed of senior agriculture officials from the member states and European Commission. The work and tasks of the Council concerning fisheries is prepared by the Committee of Permanent Representatives (COREPER), composed of fisheries experts from the member states and European Commission.

Within the Council Secretariat, the work and tasks of the Council is prepared by the Directorate-General for Agriculture, Fisheries, Social Affairs and Health.

== See also ==
- European Parliament Committee on Agriculture and Rural Development
- European Parliament Committee on Fisheries
- European Commissioner for Agriculture and Rural Development
  - Directorate-General for Agriculture and Rural Development
- European Commissioner for Maritime Affairs and Fisheries
  - Directorate-General for Maritime Affairs and Fisheries
- Community Plant Variety Office
- European Food Safety Authority
- European Fisheries Control Agency
