= Special Committee on Agriculture =

The Special Committee on Agriculture (SCA) is an administrative body of the European Union that prepares the work and tasks of the Agriculture and Fisheries Council (a configuration of the Council of the European Union) concerning agriculture, similar to the role of the Committee of Permanent Representatives (COREPER) for other Council configurations.

The SCA was established by a decision of representatives of Member States’ governments in May 1960. There has never been a specific reference to it in any of the Treaties.

== See also ==
- Directorate-General for Agriculture, Fisheries, Social Affairs and Health
