= Villons-les-Buissons =

- Commune
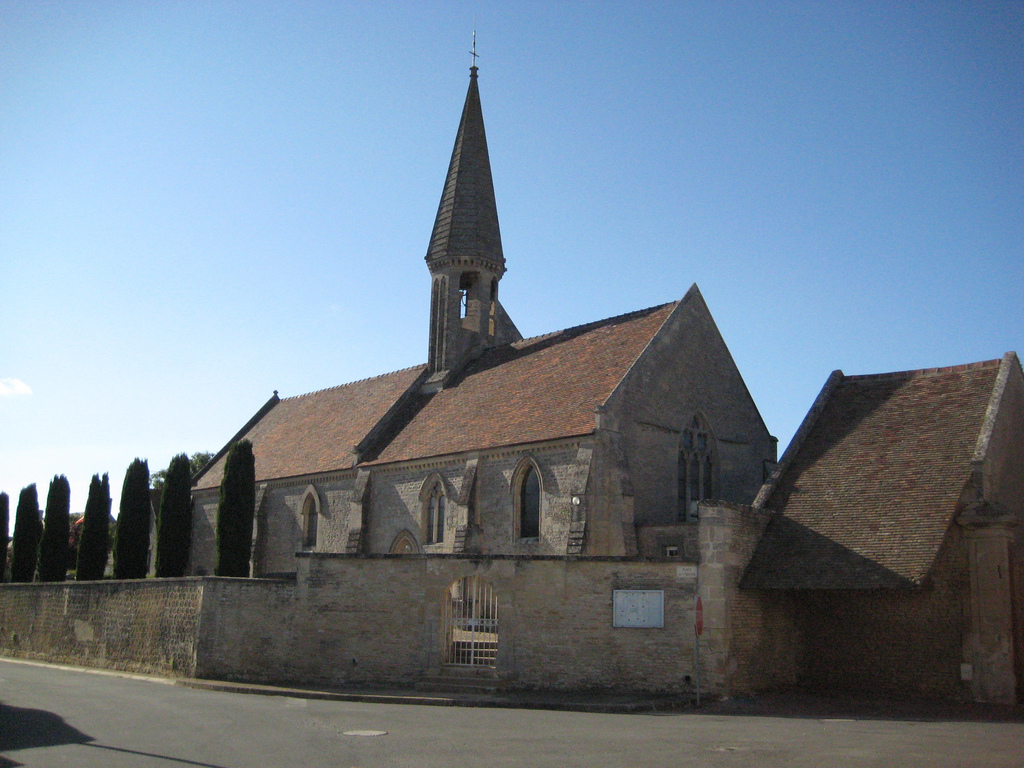
- The church in Villons-les-Buissons
- Location of Villons-les-Buissons
- Location within France Location within Normandy
- Coordinates: 49°14′28″N 0°24′29″W
- Country: France
- Region: Normandy
- Department: Calvados
- Arrondissement: Caen
- Canton: Caen-2
- Intercommunality: CU Caen la Mer

Government
  - Mayor (2020–2026): Patrick de Bruyn
- Area^{1}: 3.76 km^{2} (1.45 sq mi)
- Elevation: 71 m (233 ft)
- Highest elevation: 75 m (246 ft)
- Lowest elevation: 58 m (190 ft)
- Population (2023): 848
  - Density: 226/km^{2} (584/sq mi)
- Time zone: UTC+01:00 (CET)
  - Summer (DST): UTC+02:00 (CEST)
- INSEE/Postal code: 14758 /14610
- ^{1} French Land Register data, which excludes lakes, ponds, glaciers > 1 km^{2} (0.386 sq mi or 247 acres) and river estuaries.

Villons-les-Buissons (French pronunciation: [vijɔ̃ le bɥisɔ̃]) is a commune in the Calvados department in the Normandy region in northwestern France.

== Population ==
Historical population
Year	Pop.	±% p.a.
1968	178	—
1975	376	+11.27%
1982	438	+2.20%
1990	550	+2.89%
1999	554	+0.08%
2007	684	+2.67%
2012	713	+0.83%
2017	749	+0.99%
2023	848	+2.09%
Source: INSEE

== See also ==
- Communes of the Calvados department
