= María Angeles Benítez Salas =

Spanish lawyer

María Angeles Benítez Salas is a Spanish lawyer and high-ranking official of the European Commission. She has served as Deputy Director-General of the Directorate-General for Agriculture and Rural Development from 2016 to 2021 and as acting Director-General in 2020. As such she was the top European civil servant in charge of European agricultural and rural development policy. In 2021 she became the head of the Representation of the European Commission in Spain.

== Career ==
She earned her law degree at the University of Granada between 1975 and 1980 and attended the College of Europe where she earned a master's in European law between 1981 and 1982 (Johan Willem Beyen Promotion). She earned a further degree in European law at the Université libre de Bruxelles in 1983. She joined the European Commission as a trainee in 1983. She was deputy head of the Bureau of European Policy Advisers 2013–2014 and deputy head of the European Commission's think-tank, the European Political Strategy Centre, 2014–2016, before she was appointed the deputy director-general of the Directorate-General for Agriculture and Rural Development in 2016. At the start of 2020 she succeeded Jerzy Bogdan Plewa as acting Director-General, and was succeeded in April 2020 by Wolfgang Burtscher.
