= European Fisheries Control Agency =

Agency of the European Union

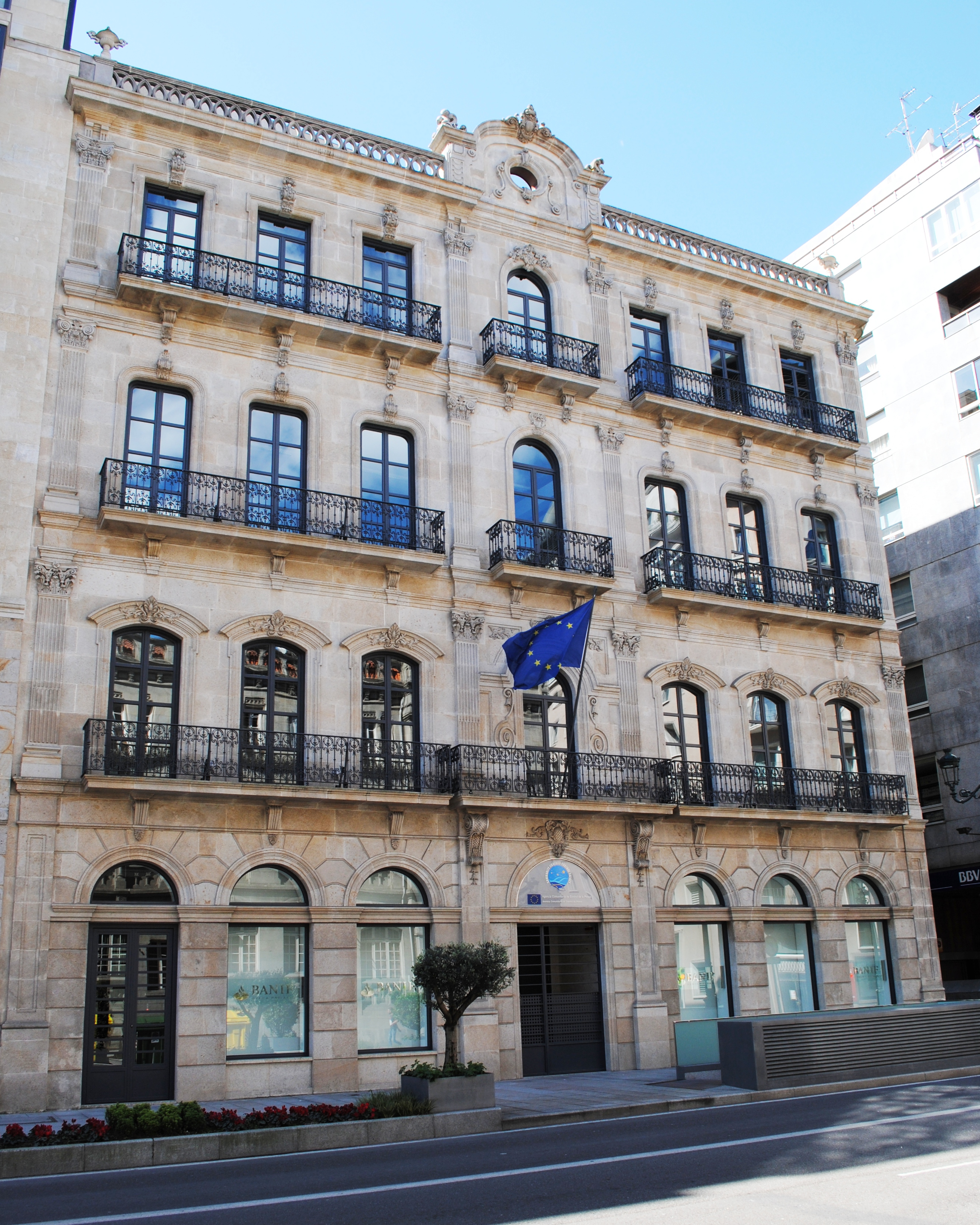
- The Odriozola building, housing the EFCA's headquarters

Agency overview
- Formed: 1 February 2006
- Preceding agency: European Fisheries Control Agency (EFCA)
- Jurisdiction: European Union
- Headquarters: Vigo, Spain
- Employees: 104
- Agency executive: Susan Steele, Executive Director
- Key document: Regulation (EU) 2019/473
- Website: www.efca.europa.eu/en

Map
- European Fisheries Control Agency (European Union)

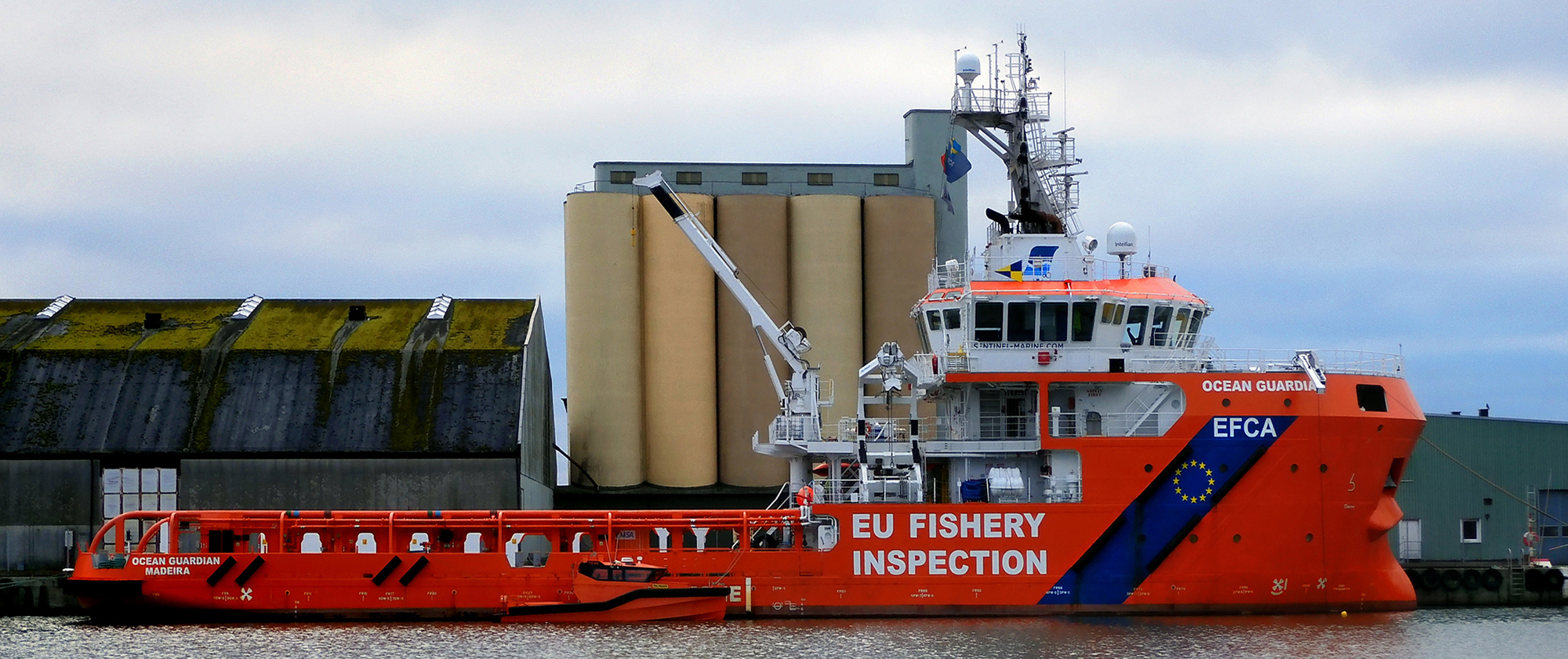
A vessel from the European Fisheries Control Agency in Ystad harbor on November 15, 2023

The European Fisheries Control Agency (EFCA) is the agency of the European Union (EU) that co-ordinates the national operational activities in the area of fisheries, and assists the member states in their application of the Common Fisheries Policy (CFP). The agency is based in Vigo (province of Pontevedra), Spain.

== History ==
The Community Fisheries Control Agency (CFCA) was established pursuant to Council Regulation (EC) No 768/2005 of 26 April 2005 which entered into force on 10 June 2005. The Administrative Board was constituted at its first meeting held on 1 February 2006. Effective 1 January 2012, the agency was renamed as the European Fisheries Control Agency. Relevant legislation was codified with Regulation (EU) 2019/473.

== Mission and objectives ==
The agency’s mission is to promote the highest common standards for control, inspection and surveillance under the Common Fisheries Policy (CFP). EFCA brokers operational cooperation between EU countries, and assists them and the Commission. It organises and coordinates cooperation between national control and inspection activities and trains national inspectors and trainers, to ensure that CFP rules are respected and applied effectively and consistently.

According to its founding regulation, the EFCA objective is ‘to organize operational coordination of fisheries control and inspection activities by the Member States and to assist them to cooperate so as to comply with the rules of the CFP in order to ensure its effective and uniform application’.

The added value of the work of the agency lies in its contribution to a European-wide level playing field for the fishing industry, and towards sustainable fisheries by enhancing compliance with existing conservation and management measures to the benefit of present and future generations.

The Agency, in cooperation with the European Border and Coast Guard Agency and the European Maritime Safety Agency, each within its mandate, supports the national authorities carrying out coast guard functions.

== Organisational structure ==
=== Administrative board ===
EFCA is governed by an administrative board, which consists of six representatives of the European Commission and one representative per member state. The agency is managed by an executive director.

The board sets the agency's priorities and work program, adopts its budget once it has been approved by the European Parliament and the Council, reports to the member states and the European institutions and appoints the executive director. In addition, the board adopts a multi-annual approach and a staff policy plan, and sets indicators to monitor the implementation of the work plan.

Board members are appointed on an individual basis for a renewable five-year term. They all have relevant experience and expertise in the field of fisheries control and inspection.

The board elects a chairperson and a deputy chairperson from among its members for a renewable three-year term. Meetings are usually held twice a year.

The executive director is responsible for the execution of the agency's operational activities and general management. He drafts the annual budget proposal and work program following consultation with the commission and national authorities. He answers to the administrative board. The executive director is appointed for a renewable five-year term.

=== Advisory board ===
The advisory board advises the executive director of the Agency and ensures close cooperation with stakeholders. The advisory board is composed of representatives of the advisory councils, on the basis of one representative designated by each advisory council. The meetings of the advisory board are chaired by the executive director.

A representative of the advisory board takes part in the deliberations of the administrative board meetings without the right to vote. The advisory board representative in the EFCA administrative board is appointed in accordance with the yearly rotation system agreed by its members.

The advisory councils are stakeholdered organisations composed of representatives from the industry and other groups of interest. In addition to the seven existing advisory councils below, the new CFP foresees the creation of four new advisory councils for the Black Sea, Aquaculture, Markets and Outermost regions.

- Baltic Sea Advisory Council (BSAC)
- South Western Waters Advisory Council (SWWAC)
- Long Distance Advisory Council (LDAC)
- Mediterranean Advisory Council (MEDAC)
- Pelagic Advisory Council (Pelagic AC)
- North Western Waters Advisory Council (NWWAC)
- North Sea Advisory Council (NSAC)

The advisory councils provide the European Commission and EU countries with recommendations on fisheries management matters.

== Activities ==
=== EU operations ===
The Agency coordinates activities on land and in Union and international waters, as appropriate. This is done through the joint deployment plans (JDPs), the vehicle through which the EFCA organizes the deployment of national human and material means of control and inspection pooled by Member States. The deployment of pooled national means is coordinated by the EFCA through coordination centers in charge in a Member State or the presence of national coordinators is at EFCA premises.

While Member States are responsible for applying the rules on their own territory, in waters under their sovereignty and jurisdiction and on fishing vessels flying their flag, wheresoever their activity is carried out, the Agency has been designed to act as a facilitator enhancing cooperation and ensuring that legislation is implemented in a systematic, uniform and effective way.

=== International operations ===
EFCA supports the European Union in the international dimension of the Common Fisheries Policy and the fight against Illegal Unregulated and Undeclared (IUU) activities. According to the CFP regulation, the Agency assists the Union in cooperating with third countries and international organisations dealing with fisheries, including RFMOs, to strengthen operational coordination and compliance.

Sustainable fisheries agreements with non-European Union countries are negotiated and concluded by the Commission on behalf of the European Union. At the request of the Commission, the European Fisheries Control Agency provides capacity building support on fisheries control and inspection to these countries with which the European Union has a sustainable fisheries partnership agreement.

In accordance with its mandate, the European Fisheries Control Agency assists Member States to fulfill their obligations by organizing workshops and seminars for national administrations on the implementation of the IUU Regulation. EFCA also supports the European Commission as requested in evaluation missions to third countries in the framework of the IUU Regulation.

During 2016, the coordination of the ongoing Joint Deployment Plans (JDPs) and other operational plans in support of the Member States, including the international dimension, reached close to 19,500 inspections (from 17,000 in 2015) which identified 665 suspected infringements.

== Pennant ==
Pennant of fishery inspection vessels

Despite not having a civil ensign, the EU's Fishery Inspection teams display a blue and yellow pennant. The pennant is flown by inspection vessels in EU waters. The flag is triangular and quartered blue and yellow according to Annex XXVIII to Commission Implementing Regulation (EU) No 404/2011. There are no other variants or alternative flags used by the EU (in contrast to countries which have presidential, naval and military variants).

== See also ==
- European Commissioner for Maritime Affairs and Fisheries
  - Directorate-General for Maritime Affairs and Fisheries
- Agriculture and Fisheries Council (Council of the European Union)
  - Directorate-General for Agriculture, Fisheries, Social Affairs and Health
- European Parliament Committee on Fisheries
