= Stéphanie Yon-Courtin =

French lawyer and politician (born 1974)

Stéphanie Yon-Courtin MEP
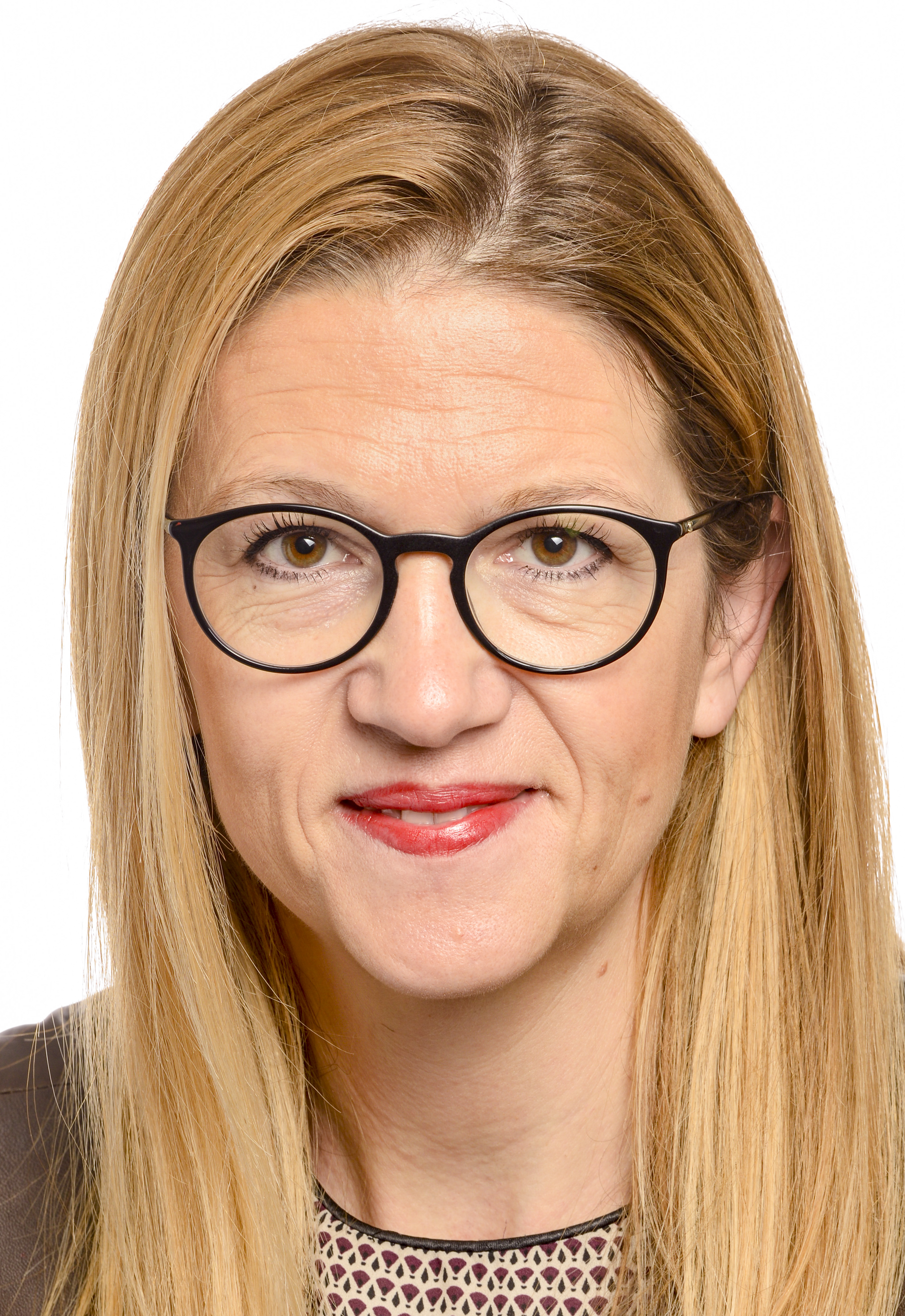

Member of the European Parliament for France
- Incumbent
- Assumed office 2 July 2019

Member of the Regional Council of Normandy
- Incumbent
- Assumed office 2 July 2021
- President: Hervé Morin

Member of the Departmental council of Calvados
- In office 2 April 2015 – 1 July 2021
- President: Jean-Léonce Dupont

Mayor of Saint-Contest
- In office 4 April 2014 – 28 June 2019
- Preceded by: Denis Desynder
- Succeeded by: Jean-Marc Philippe

Personal details
- Born: 28 March 1974 (age 52) Coutances, France
- Party: Renaissance (since 2019); The Republicans (2015-18)
- Education: University of Caen Normandy; University of Bristol
- Profession: Lawyer

Stéphanie Yon-Courtin (born 28 March 1974) is a French lawyer and politician of Renaissance who has been serving as a Member of the European Parliament since 2019.

== Early career ==
In the late 1990s, Yon-Courtin spent nearly two years working at the European Commission. before moving to law firms Freshfields Bruckhaus Deringer and Allen & Overy. She later worked as advisor to France's Competition Authority from 2007 until 2010.

== Political career ==
Ahead of the 2017 French legislative election, Yon-Courtin ran for the Republicans' nomination in Calvados.

Since entering the European Parliament, Yon-Courtin has been serving on the Committee on Economic and Monetary Affairs. In this capacity, she is the parliament's rapporteur on competition law and the 2021 Digital Markets Act.

In addition to her committee assignments, Yon-Courtin chairs the Parliament's delegation for relations with Canada. She is also a member of the European Parliament Intergroup on Artificial Intelligence and Digital, the European Parliament Intergroup on Children's Rights, the European Parliament Intergroup on Climate Change, Biodiversity and Sustainable Development, the European Parliament Intergroup on Seas, Rivers, Islands and Coastal Areas and the MEPs Against Cancer group.

Yon-Courtin was re-elected as an MEP in 2024.

== Political positions ==
In a 2022 letter to European Commissioner for the Environment, Oceans and Fisheries Virginijus Sinkevičius, Yon-Courtin – together with Pierre Karleskind and Nathalie Loiseau – urged the EU to take measures to end British water treatment facilities’ discharges of raw sewage into shared waters, part of what they argued was an unacceptable lowering of environmental standards since Brexit.
