= Canada–United States Consultative Committee on Agriculture =

The Canada–United States Consultative Committee on Agriculture (CCA) is a binational panel of government officials, formed in April 1999, to improve cooperation and discuss differences on issues related to agricultural trade between the two countries. The CCA meets twice yearly.
