= European Climate Change Programme =

EU environmental program

The European Climate Change Programme (ECCP) was launched in June 2000 by the European Union's European Commission, with the purpose of avoiding dangerous climate change.

The goal of the ECCP is to identify, develop and implement all the necessary elements of an EU strategy to implement the Kyoto Protocol. All EU countries' ratifications of the Kyoto Protocol were deposited simultaneously on 31 May 2002. The ECCP involved all the relevant stakeholders working together, including representatives from Commission's different departments, the member states, industry and environmental groups.

The European Union Emissions Trading System for greenhouse gases (EU ETS) is perhaps the most significant contribution of the ECCP, and the EU ETS is the largest greenhouse gas emissions trading scheme in the world.

In 1996 the EU adopted a target of a maximum 2 °C rise in global mean temperature, compared to pre-industrial levels. Since then, European Leaders have reaffirmed this goal several times. Due to only minor efforts in global Climate change mitigation it is highly likely that the world will not be able to reach this particular target. The EU might then be forced to accept a less ambitious target or to change its climate policy paradigm.

== Vehicles ==
Under the framework of the European Climate Change Programme, the European Commission was to present in mid-as of 2006 a Communication to the European Parliament and European Council on a revised Community strategy to reduce CO_{2} emissions from light-duty vehicles. This review will be based on a thorough impact assessment of the existing Community target of a new car fleet average emission of 120 CO_{2} g/km and of the possible measures that could form part of a revised strategy based on an integrated approach to CO_{2} emissions reductions.

On 7 February 2007, the European Commission announced plans for new legislation requiring the average carbon dioxide emissions of the vehicles produced in 2012 to be no more than 130 g/km. This is a bit more than the goal of 120, which corresponds to 4.5 L/100 km for diesel and 5 L/100 km for gasoline engines.

In March 2011, the European Commission presented the EU Transport Roadmap, which shows pathways to achieve a 60% cut in greenhouse gases from all modes of transport by 2050.

In May 2022, some countries in the European Union strongly reduced the price for traveling on public transport, among others, because this is a relatively climate-friendly mode of transportation: Germany, Austria, Ireland, Italy. Germany reduced the price to 9 euro. In some cities the price was cut by more than 90%. The national rail company of Germany committed to increase the number of trains and extend lines to new destinations. The use of trains significantly increased so that "ticket websites have crashed upon the release of the tickets."

=== The "yellow vest" protest and the lessons from it ===
In 2019 the yellow vests movement rose in France. One of the main reasons was the high price for fuel, introduced by Emmanuel Macron's government as part of the program to curb emissions from vehicles. Another cause was the reduction of the speed limit with the purpose of saving 200 lives per year. The causes of the anger were the heavy reliance of the rural populations on cars and the disproportionality of the tax: the poor who are the less guilty for the emissions were hit harder. The Macron government cancelled the original plans for a fuel tax, hurting the aim of reducing effects of climate change.

Many think that the lesson should be: reduce the emissions from vehicles not by tax that hurt the poorest, but by more fairer taxes, making alternatives, for example by bicycle lanes, bus lanes, and lower prices of train travel.

== See also ==
- Directorate-General for Climate Action (European Commission)
- Climate of Europe#Climate targets
- Climate target
- Energy policy of the European Union
- Fit for 55
- Making Sweden an Oil-Free Society
- Renewable energy in the European Union
- Indian Youth Climate Network
