= European Commissioner for Fisheries and Oceans =

Member of the EU Commission

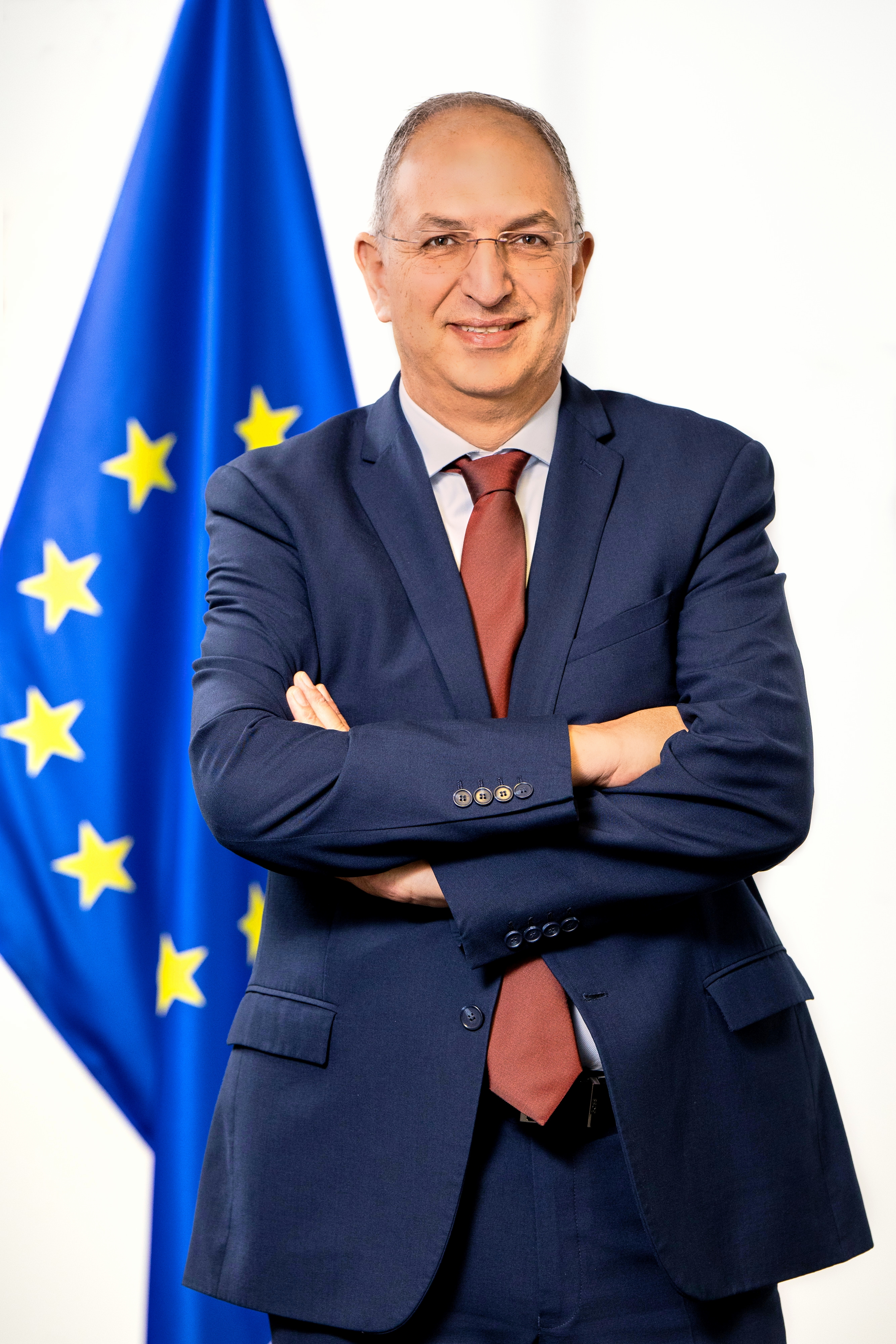
- Incumbent; Costas Kadis since 1 December 2024
- Appointer: President of the European Commission
- Term length: 5 years
- Inaugural holder: Costas Kadis
- Website: https://commission.europa.eu/about/organisation/college-commissioners/costas-kadis_en

The European Commissioner for Fisheries and Oceans is a member of the European Commission. The current Commissioner is Costas Kadis.

== Fisheries ==
The portfolio includes policies such as the Common Fisheries Policy, which is largely a competence of the European Union rather than the members. The Union has 66,000 km of coastline and the largest Exclusive Economic Zone in the world, covering 25 million km^{2}. They also participate in meetings of the Agriculture and Fisheries Council (Agrifish) configuration of the Council of the European Union.

== Former commissioners ==
=== Karmenu Vella ===
2014–2019 the Commissioner was Karmenu Vella of Malta. In his hearing before the Committee on the Environment, Public Health and Food Safety and the Committee on Fisheries, and in his introductory statement to the European Parliament, Vella listed as his priorities Green Growth, protection of natural capital, and safeguarding the Union's citizens from environment related pressures and risks to health.

=== Stavros Dimas ===
During his hearing with the European Parliament, Stavros Dimas announced four main priorities for his term in office: climate change, biodiversity, public health and sustainability; Highlighting the importance of the Kyoto Protocol, the Natura 2000 project, the REACH directive, and the need to better enforce existing EU environmental legislation. On Dimas' website he lists the following key policy areas; Air, Biotechnology, Chemicals, Civil Protection and Environmental Accidents, Climate Change, Environmental Technologies, Health, International Issues and Enlargement, Nature and Biodiversity, Noise, Soil, Sustainable Development, Urban Environment, Waste and Water.

At the UN's Buenos Aires talks on climate change in December 2004 he attempted to negotiate mandatory emissions reductions to follow the expiration of Kyoto in 2012. This met with opposition from the US, whose representatives refused to discuss it.

Dimas oversaw the introduction of the EU's emissions trading scheme that took effect on 1 January 2005, despite emissions reduction plans from Poland, Italy, the Czech Republic and Greece not having been approved on time. He also sought to include companies operating aircraft under the emissions trading regime.

In February 2007 the commissioner put forward his plans to increase fuel efficiency standards of cars so that emissions are no more than 130g of CO_{2} per km, down from 162g/km in 2005. This caused anger from the European car industry which was stoked by the Commissioner requesting a Japanese car, a Toyota Prius, instead of a European make, due to the Toyota's better environmental standards.

In response to the refusal of countries to ratify the Kyoto Protocol, such as the United States and Australia (the latter of which exchanged viewpoints with the EU on the matter), the EU has been looking to tax products imported from those countries not taking low-carbon policies on board (Border Tax Adjustments). (Australia subsequently ratified the Kyoto Protocol, at the Bali COP in December 2007.)

=== Carlo Ripa di Meana ===
Carlo Ripa di Meana was appointed Environment Commissioner in 1990, which coincided with increased public interest and awareness in environmental issues. Ripa di Meana's appointment took place at the same time as that of a new Directorate-General, Brinkhorst. They both tried to change the image of DG XI (now DG Environment) in charge of environmental issues and make it a more mainstream actor. According to Schön-Quinlivan the then president of the commission, Jacques Delors, did not appreciate Ripa di Meana's political style and their relationship became strained. Ripa di Meana was eventually replaced by Karel Van Miert for a period of six months until a full-time replacement could be found. Van Miert supported what had been done before him and described environmental policy as 'one of our most successful policies, and one of the best understood'.

=== Joe Borg ===
Commissioner Borg was approved by the European Parliament in 2004 and served until 2010. His two main priorities were "setting the European Union on the path towards a European Maritime Policy" and "securing the ecological, economic and social sustainability of the European fishing and aquaculture industry" On 7 June 2006 the European Commission published a green paper on a future Maritime Policy and opened a consultation that ended in June 2007 . The green paper addressed a number of issues such as sustainable development, protection of the environment, skills and employment, technology and resources, coastal safety and tourism, financial support and heritage. On 10 October 2007 the European Commission presented its vision for an integrated maritime policy with a detailed action plan The Commission came under fire in May 2007 for not penalising French fishermen for over-fishing the threatened bluefin tuna by 65% while backing penalties on Irish fishermen for over-fishing mackerel.

== List of commissioners ==
=== Environment ===
#	Name	Country	Period	Commission
1	Carlo Ripa di Meana	Italy	1990–1992	Delors Commission
2	Karel Van Miert	Belgium	1992–1993	Delors Commission
3	Ioannis Paleokrassas	Greece	1993–1995	Delors Commission
4	Ritt Bjerregaard	Denmark	1995–1999	Santer Commission
5	Margot Wallström	Sweden	1999–2004	Prodi Commission
6	Stavros Dimas	Greece	2004–2010	Barroso Commission I
7	Janez Potočnik	Slovenia	2010–2014	Barroso Commission II

=== Agriculture, Rural Development and Fisheries ===
A single portfolio including the former – and future – portfolio of the EU Commissioner for Agriculture.

#	Name	Country	Period	Commission
1	Franz Fischler	Austria	1999–2004	Prodi Commission
2	Sandra Kalniete	Latvia	2004	Prodi Commission

=== Maritime Affairs and Fisheries ===
(or Fisheries and Maritime Affairs)

#	Name	Country	Period	Commission
3	Joe Borg	Malta	2004–2010	Barroso Commission I
4	Maria Damanaki	Greece	2010–2014	Barroso Commission II

=== Environment, Maritime Affairs and Fisheries ===
#	Name	Country	Period	Commission
5	Karmenu Vella	Malta	2014–2019	Juncker Commission
6	Virginijus Sinkevičius	Lithuania	2019-2024	von der Leyen Commission I

=== Fisheries and Oceans ===
#	Name	Country	Period	Commission
7	Costas Kadis	Cyprus	since 2024	von der Leyen Commission II

== See also ==
=== Environment ===
- Directorate-General for the Environment
- EU environmental policy
- European Environment Agency
- Coordination of Information on the Environment
- Global warming and Kyoto Protocol:
  - European Climate Change Programme
  - European Union Emission Trading Scheme
  - Renewable energy in the European Union
  - Transport in the European Union
- Water supply and sanitation in the European Union
  - Water Framework Directive
- REACH regulation
- Geography of the European Union
  - Natura 2000
  - Common Agricultural Policy

=== Fisheries ===
- Directorate-General for Maritime Affairs and Fisheries
- Common Fisheries Policy
- Agriculture and Fisheries Council (Council of the European Union)
  - Directorate-General for Agriculture, Fisheries, Social Affairs and Health
- European Parliament Committee on Fisheries
- European Fisheries Control Agency
