= Slovenia and the European Union =

European Union–Slovenia relations

- Slovenia: European Union

Slovenia has been a member of the European Union since 2004.

== History ==
Slovenia joined the European Union during the Great Enlargement of 2004, together with Cyprus, the Czech Republic, Estonia, Hungary, Latvia, Lithuania, Malta, Poland, and Slovakia.

=== Accession and further integration ===
Slovenia filed its request to join EU in 1996, just four years after becoming an independent state. On June 10, 1996, Slovenia signed the Accession Agreement with the EU. On March 31, 1998, Slovenia formally began its membership negotiations, adjusting its laws to acquis, and reforming its political system to fulfill the Copenhagen criteria. On February 1, 1999, Slovenia officially becomes an EU associate member, and ends its accession negotiations in 2002.

Prior to joining the EU a referendum was held in Slovenia in which almost 90 % of voters voted in favor of EU membership.

Slovenia held its first election to the European Parliament on June 13, 2003. First elected MEPs were Ljudmila Novak, Lojze Peterle, Jelko Kacin, Mojca Drčar Murko, Miha Brejc, Romana Jordan Cizelj and Borut Pahor.

On January 1, 2007, Slovenia becomes the first members state of the 2004 enlargement to adopt Euro as its official currency. On December 27, 2007, Slovenia also joins the Schengen Area.

From January 1, 2008, until June 30, 2008, Slovenia held its first presidency of the Council of the European Union, as the first new member after 2004 enlargement.

== Slovenia in EU institutions ==
=== Slovenia in the Council of the EU ===
Slovenia is represented in the Council of the European Union by the Government. Usually ministers represent the state, but also state secretaries, permanent representative or deputy permanent representative can represent Slovenia in the meetings.

==== Current representation ====
Configuration	Responsible ministry
General Affairs (GAC)	Ministry of Foreign and European Affairs (general)
General Affairs (GAC)	Ministry of Cohesion and Regional Development (cohesion)
General Affairs (GAC)	Ministry of Digital Transformation (digitalization)
Foreign Affairs (FAC)	Ministry of Foreign and European Affairs (general, development)
Foreign Affairs (FAC)	Ministry of Defence (defence)
Foreign Affairs (FAC)	Ministry of Economy, Tourism and Sport (trade)
Economic and Financial Affairs (Ecofin)	Ministry of Finance
Agriculture and Fisheries (Agrifish)	Ministry of Agriculture, Forestry and Food
Justice and Home Affairs (JHA)	Ministry of Justice (justice)
Justice and Home Affairs (JHA)	Ministry of the Interior (home affairs)
Justice and Home Affairs (JHA)	Ministry of Defence (civil protection)
Employment, Social Policy, Health and Consumer Affairs (EPSCO)	Ministry of Labour, Family, Social Affairs and Equal Opportunities (employment, social protection, equal opportunities)
Employment, Social Policy, Health and Consumer Affairs (EPSCO)	Ministry of Health (health)
Employment, Social Policy, Health and Consumer Affairs (EPSCO)	Ministry of Economy, Tourism and Sport (consumer protection)
Competitiveness (COMPET)	Ministry of Economy, Tourism and Sport (internal market, industry, space, tourism)
Competitiveness (COMPET)	Ministry of Higher Education, Science and Innovation (research)
Transport, Telecommunications and Energy (TTE)	Ministry of Infrastructure (transport)
Transport, Telecommunications and Energy (TTE)	Ministry of the Environment, Climate and Energy (energy)
Transport, Telecommunications and Energy (TTE)	Ministry of Digital Transformation (telecommunications)
Environment (ENV)	Ministry of the Environment, Climate and Energy (environment)
Environment (ENV)	Ministry of Natural Resources and Spatial Planning (water, nature)
Education, Youth, Culture and Sport (EYC)	Ministry of Education (education, youth)
Education, Youth, Culture and Sport (EYC)	Ministry of Economy, Tourism and Sport (sport)
Education, Youth, Culture and Sport (EYC)	Ministry of Culture (culture, audiovisual issues)

==== Presidency of the Council ====
Slovenia held the presidency of the Council twice since 2004, in the first half of 2008 and the second half of 2021. Next Slovenian presidency is not yet scheduled. The first presidency was led by the first Janša government and held prior to the entry into force of the Lisbon Treaty and therefore Slovenian Prime Minister Janez Janša also presided over then informal meetings of the European Council. The second presidency was also led by Janša's government.

Slovenia is a member of the first presidency trio together with Germany and Portugal.

=== Slovenia in the European Council ===
Slovenia is represented in the European Council by the prime minister, because of its parliamentary system of government.

Current representative of Slovenia in the European Council is Prime Minister Robert Golob, member of the liberal bloc (Renew).

=== Slovenia in the European Parliament ===
Slovenia currently has 9 members of the European Parliament (change after 2024 election), representing Slovenian and all other European citizens. Slovenian MEPs never held any position in the leadership of the Parliament.

==== Current MEPs ====
MEP	Group	Positions
Romana Tomc	EPP	Vice-President of the European People's Party Group; Member of the EMPL Committee; Substitute of the TRAN Committee; Substitute of the LIBE Committee
Milan Zver	EPP	Member of the ENVI Committee; Substitute of the AFET Committee
Branko Grims	EPP	Member of the LIBE Committee; Substitute of the AFCO Committee
Zala Tomašič	EPP	Member of the CULT Committee; Substitute of the ITRE Committee; Substitute of the IMCO Committee
Matej Tonin	EPP	Member of the ITRE Committee; Substitute of the AFET Committee
Vladimir Prebilič	G/EFA	Member of the REGI Committee; Substitute of the AFET Committee; Substitute of the ECON Committee
Matjaž Nemec	S&D	Member of the LIBE Committee; Member of the BUDG Committee; Substitute of the AFET Committee
Irena Joveva	Renew	Vice-President of the Renew Europe; Member of the LIBE Committee; Member of the EMPL Committee; Substitute of the SANT Subcommittee
Marjan Šarec	Renew	Member of the TRAN Committee; Substitute of the AFET Committee; Substitute of the SEDE Subcommittee

==== Group leadership positions ====
In 2014-2019 term Tanja Fajon (S&D), then a second term MEP, was elected vice-president of the Progressive Alliance of Socialists and Democrats Group, the first ever Slovenian MEP to hold group leadership position. In 2024-2029 term Romana Tomc was elected vice-president of the European People's Party Group, and Irena Joveva was elected vice-president of the Renew Europe.

=== Slovenia in the European Commission ===
Since becoming a member of the EU Slovenia has been entitled to a one member of the European Commission. Slovenia has never held a presidency or vice-presidency of the Commission.

Commissioner	Party/Group	Term began	Term ended	Portfolio	Commission
Janez Potočnik	ALDE	1 May 2004	21 November 2004	Enlargement	Prodi
Janez Potočnik	ALDE	22 November 2004	9 February 2010	Science and Research	Barroso I
Janez Potočnik	ALDE	9 February 2010	31 October 2014	Environment	Barroso II
Violeta Bulc	ALDE	1 November 2014	30 November 2019	Transport	Juncker
Janez Lenarčič	Renew	1 December 2019	30 November 2024	Crisis Management	von der Leyen I
Marta Kos	Renew	1 December 2024	incumbent	Enlargement	von der Leyen II

Additionally in 2014, incumbent Primer Minister Alenka Bratušek was a candidate for a vice-president for the Energy Union in the Juncker Commission, but did not pass the hearing in the European Parliament. She was later replaced by Deputy Prime Minister and Cohesion Minister in the Cerar Government Violeta Bulc. President Juncker switched portfolios of the Slovenian commissioner for a Transport portfolio and offered the Vice-Presidency of the Energy Union portfolio to a Slovak Maroš Šefčovič.

In 2024, the Slovenian government proposed former president of the Court of Audit of Slovenia Tomaž Vesel to be the next Slovenian member of the Commission. However, Vesel dropped his candidacy and the government nominated Marta Kos after Ursula von der Leyen had pushed for a greater gender balance among the members of the Commission.

==== Slovenians in the EEAS ====
Several Slovenian diplomats served in the European External Action Service (EEAS) as heads of missions of the European Union around the world. The first diplomat to serve in the EU diplomatic service was former foreign minister Samuel Žbogar, serving in Kosovo (2011-2016).

EU Ambassador	Country	Term
Samuel Žbogar	Kosovo (Pristina) also EU Special Representative to Kosovo	2011–2016
Samuel Žbogar	North Macedonia (Skopje)	2016–2020
Mitja Drobnič	Montenegro (Podgorica)	2012–2016
Jernej Videtič	Guyana (Georgetown)	2015–2019
Jernej Videtič	Papua New Guinea (Port Moresby)	2019–2022
Melita Gabrič	Canada (Ottawa)	2021–Incumbent
Veronika Bošković-Pohar	Afghanistan (Kabul)	TBD
Aleška Simkić	Kazakhstan (Astana)	TBD

==== European Commission's representation in Slovenia ====
Head of Representation	Term
Zoran Stančič	2016–2020
Jerneja Jug Jerše	2021–Incumbent

=== Slovenia in the Court of Justice ===
==== Court of Justice ====
Marko Ilešič was the first and for now the only judge to serve on the Court of Justice in the name of Slovenia, serving from 2004 until 2024. He was a president of a chamber for two terms (2012–2018).

Judge	Term began	Term ended	Positions
Marko Ilešič	1 May 2004	21 June 2024	President of Chamber (2012–2018)
TBD	Vacant		

Additionally to Judge Ilešič, Verica Trstenjak served as Advocate General at the Court of Justice (7 October 2006–28 November 2012).

==== General Court ====
Slovenia is entitled to two judges at the General Court.

Position 1				Position 2			
Judge	Term began	Term ended	Positions	Judge	Term began	Term ended	Positions
Verica Trstenjak	7 July 2004	6 October 2006					
Miro Prek	6 October 2006	26 October 2019	President of Chamber (2013-2019)				
Maja Brkan	6 July 2021	Incumbent		Damjan Kukovec	13 January 2022	Incumbent	

Two candidates, Marko Pavliha and Klemen Podobnik, did not pass the hearings before the committee, established according to Article 255 of TFEU.

=== European Public Prosecutor's Office ===
Slovenia is a participating state in the European Public Prosecutor's Office since 2019.

European Prosecutor	Term
Jaka Brezigar	2020-Incumbent

==== The Janša Appointment Affair ====
During the Slovenia's second Council presidency in 2021 Slovenian government, then led by Janez Janša, prevented the selection of two Slovenian delegated prosecutors, because of which then justice minister Lilijana Kozlovič resigned. ORF and other media reported that Janša might have opposed the nomination of the two prosecutors because they had also been involved in investigations against him in the past. EU justice commissioner Didier Reynders proposed a compromise to appoint just one delegated prosecutor, but this was rejected by economy minister Zdravko Počivalšek as overstepping governments' competence and criticising the EU for exerting pressure. Slovenia was also urged to appoint delegated prosecutor by the Commission president Ursula von der Leyen during European Commission's visit to Slovenia on 6 July 2021.

=== Slovenia in other institutions ===
The European Committee of the Regions includes seven Slovenian members and their deputies who act in the name of two representative organisations of Slovenian local communities: the Association of Municipalities and Towns of Slovenia and the Association of Municipalities of Slovenia.

The European Economic and Social Committee has seven Slovenian members that represent the interests of employers, trade unions and other interest groups.

The Governor of the Bank of Slovenia sits in the Governing Council of the European Central Bank while other experts from the Bank of Slovenia operate in its working bodies.

== Permanent mission to the EU ==
=== Permanent Representative ===
Permanent Representative of Slovenia in the EU is a diplomat in the rank of ambassador who represents Slovenia in COREPER II, all configuration that fall within the scope of COREPER II (judiciary and internal affairs, trade policy, EU enlargement, finance and regional policy, EU foreign and security policy), and all other official relations between Slovenia and EU and relations with other member states.

Current Permanent Representative is Ambassador Iztok Jarc, former Minister of Agriculture.

==== Deputy Permanent Representative ====
Permanent Representative of Slovenia in the EU is a diplomat in the rank of ambassador who represents Slovenia in COREPER I, all configuration that fall within the scope of COREPER I (economy, single market and industry, agriculture, fisheries, forestry, veterinary medicine, environment, health, infrastructure, telecommunication, energy, education, science, youth policies, sport, employment, social affairs and culture).

Current Deputy Permanent Representative is Ambassador David Brozina.

== Slovenia's foreign relations with EU member states ==
- Austria
- Belgium
- Bulgaria
- Croatia
- Cyprus
- Czech Republic
- Denmark
- Estonia
- Finland
- France
- Germany
- Greece
- Hungary
- (Republic of Ireland) Ireland
- Italy
- Latvia
- Lithuania
- Luxembourg
- Malta
- Netherlands
- Poland
- Portugal
- Romania
- Slovakia
- Spain
- Sweden

== See also ==
- Yugoslavia–European Communities relations
