= 2021 Slovenian Presidency of the Council of the European Union =

Slovenian Presidency of the Council of the European Union

- Logo of the 2021 Slovenian presidency 1 July – 31 December 2021
- Council of the European Union
- Website: si2021.eu/

Presidency trio
- Germany; Portugal; Slovenia

2021 Slovenian Presidency of the Council of the European Union was Slovenia's second presidency of the Council held between 1 July and 31 December 2021. Slovenia held the first presidency from 1 January until 30 June 2008.

Slovenia is part of the 10th Presidency Trio, together with Germany and Portugal. This trio is the first in the second cycle of presidencies.

The head of the presidency was Anže Logar, who was the Minister of Foreign Affairs of Slovenia.

== Presidency trio ==
Trio	Member state	Term
9	Croatia	1 January 2020 – 30 June 2020
10	Germany	1 July 2020 – 31 December 2020
10	Portugal	1 January 2021 – 30 June 2021
10	Slovenia	1 July 2021 – 31 December 2021
11	France	1 January 2022 – 30 June 2022

== Political priorities ==
Political priorities of the Slovenian presidency of the council was:

- The resilience, recovery and strategic autonomy of the European Union,
- Conference on the Future of Europe,
- A union of the European way of life, the rule of law and equal criteria for all, and
- A credible and secure European Union, capable of ensuring security and stability in its neighbourhood

== Presidents-in-Office of the Council ==
Council configuration		Presidents-in-Office (current office holders)	Responsible EU Commissioner
GAC - General Affairs (COREPER II)
General Affairs	GAC	Gašper Dovžan, State Secretary in the Ministry for Foreign Affairs, Delegated Minister for European Affairs	Maroš Šefčovič, Vice President for Interinstitutional Relations and Foresight; Věra Jourová, Vice-President for Values and Transparency; Dubravka Šuica, Vice-President for Democracy and Demography; Olivér Várhelyi, Commissioner for Neighbourhood and Enlargement; Didier Reynders, Commissioner for Justice and Consumer Affairs; Janez Lenarčič, Commissioner for Crisis Management; Johannes Hahn, Commissioner for Budget and Administration
Cohesion	GAC/Cohesion	Zvone Černač, Minister without Portfolio responsible for Development, Strategic Projects and Cohesion	Elisa Ferreira, Commissioner for Cohesion and Reforms
FAC - Foreign Affairs (COREPER II)
Foreign Affairs	FAC	Josep Borrell, High representative of the Union	Frans Timmermans, First Vice-President, Executive Vice-President for the European Green Deal, Commissioner for Climate Action; Margrethe Vestager, Executive Vice-President for Europe Fit for Digital Age, Commissioner for Competiotion; Josep Borrell, High representative of the Union; Janez Lenarčič, Commissioner for Crisis Management; Jutta Urpilainen, Commissioner for International Partnerships; Olivér Várhelyi, Commissioner for Neighbourhood and Enlargement; Thierry Breton, Commissioner for the Internal Market
Foreign Affairs	FAC	Anže Logar, Minister of Foreign Affairs	
Defence	FAC/Defence	Josep Borrell, Vice-President and High representative of the Union	
Defence	FAC/Defence	Matej Tonin, Minister of Defence	
Development	FAC/Development	Josep Borrell, Vice-President and High representative of the Union	
Development	FAC/Development	Stanislav Raščan, State Secretary in the Ministry of Foreign Affairs, Delegated Minister for Development	
Trade	FAC/Trade	Zdravko Počivalšek, Minister of Economic Development and Technology	Valdis Dombrovskis, Executive Vice-President for An Economy That Works for People, Commissioner for Trade
ECOFIN - Economic and Financial Affairs (COREPER II)
Finance	ECOFIN	Andrej Šircelj, Minister of Finance	Margrethe Vestager, Executive Vice-President for Europe Fit for Digital Age, Commissioner for Competiotion; Valdis Dombrovskis, Executive Vice-President for An Economy That Works for People, Commissioner for Trade; Paolo Gentiloni, Commissioner for Economy; Mairead McGuinness, Commissioner for Financial Stability, Financial Services and the Capital Markets Union; Jutta Urpilainen, Commissioner for International Partnerships
Budget	ECOFIN/Budget	Irena Dermaž, High Representative for EU Budget Negotiations, Delegated Minister for the EU Budget	Johannes Hahn, Commissioner for Budget and Administration
JHA - Justice and Home Affairs (COREPER II)
Home Affairs	JHA	Aleš Hojs, Minister of Interior	Margaritis Schinas, Vice-President for Promoting the European Way of Life; Dubravka Šuica, Vice-President for Democracy and Demography; Ylva Johansson, Commissioner for Home Affairs; Janez Lenarčič, Commissioner for Crisis Management
Justice	JHA	Marjan Dikaučič, Minister of Justice	Věra Jourová, Vice-President for Values and Transparency; Didier Reynders, Commissioner for Justice and Consumer Affairs
AGRIFISH - Agriculture and Fisheries (COREPER I, SCA)			
Agriculture	AGRIFISH	Jože Podgoršek, Minister of Agriculture, Forestry and Food	Janusz Wojciechowski, Commissioner for Agriculture; Stella Kyriakides, Commissioner for Health and Food Safety
Fisheries	AGRIFISH	Jože Podgoršek, Minister of Agriculture, Forestry and Food	Virginijus Sinkevičius, Commissioner for Environment, Oceans and Fisheries
EPSCO - Employment, Social Policy, Health and Consumer Affairs (COREPER I)
Employment and Social Policy	EPSCO	Janez Cigler Kralj, Minister of Labour, Family and Social Affairs and Equal Opportunities	Valdis Dombrovskis, Executive Vice-President for An Economy That Works for People, Commissioner for Trade; Nicolas Schmit, Commissioner for Jobs and Social Rights; Helena Dalli, Commissioner for Equality
Health	EPSCO	Janez Poklukar, Minister of Health	Margaritis Schinas, Vice-President for Promoting the European Way of Life; Stella Kyriakides, Commissioner for Health and Food Safety
Consumer Protection	EPSCO	Zdravko Počivalšek, Minister of Economic Development and Technology	Didier Reynders, Commissioner for Justice and Consumer Affairs
COMPET - Competitiveness (COREPER I)
Internal Market and Industry	COMPET/Internal Market and Industry	Zdravko Počivalšek, Minister of Economic Development and Technology	Margrethe Vestager, Executive Vice-President for Europe Fit for Digital Age, Commissioner for Competiotion; Valdis Dombrovskis, Executive Vice-President for An Economy That Works for People, Commissioner for Trade; Maroš Šefčovič, Vice President for Interinstitutional Relations and Foresight; Thierry Breton, Commissioner for the Internal Market; Mairead McGuinness, Commissioner for Financial Stability, Financial Services and the Capital Markets Union; Didier Reynders, Commissioner for Justice and Consumer Affairs
Internal Market and Industry	COMPET/Internal Market and Industry	Boštjan Koritnik, Minister of Public Administration	
Internal Market and Industry	COMPET/Internal Market and Industry	Mark Boris Andrijanič, Minister without portfolio responsible for Digital Transformation	
Research	COMPET/Research and Space	Simona Kustec, Minister of Education, Science and Sport	Margrethe Vestager, Executive Vice-President for Europe Fit for Digital Age, Commissioner for Competiotion; Mariya Gabriel, Commissioner for Innovation, Research, Culture, Education and Youth
Space	COMPET/Research and Space	Zdravko Počivalšek, Minister of Economic Development and Technology	Thierry Breton, Commissioner for the Internal Market
TTE - Transport, Telecommunications and Energy (COREPER I)
Energy	TTE/Energy	Jernej Vrtovec, Minister of Infrastructure	Kadri Simson, Commissioner for Energy
Transport	TTE/Transport	Jernej Vrtovec, Minister of Infrastructure	Adina Vălean, Commissioner for Transport
Telecommucations	TTE/Telecom	Boštjan Koritnik, Minister of Public Administration	Margrethe Vestager, Executive Vice-President for Europe Fit for Digital Age, Commissioner for Competiotion; Thierry Breton, Commissioner for the Internal Market
ENVI - Environment (COREPER I)
Environment	ENVI	Andrej Vizjak, Minister of Environment and Spatial Planning	Frans Timmermans, First Vice-President, Executive Vice-President for the European Green Deal, Commissioner for Climate Action; Valdis Dombrovskis, Executive Vice-President for An Economy That Works for People, Commissioner for Trade; Virginijus Sinkevičius, Commissioner for Environment, Oceans and Fisheries
EYCS - Education, Youth, Culture and Sport (COREPER I)
Education	EYCS	Simona Kustec, Minister of Education, Science and Sport	Margaritis Schinas, Vice-President for Promoting the European Way of Life; Věra Jourová, Vice-President for Values and Transparency; Mariya Gabriel, Commissioner for Innovation, Research, Culture, Education and Youth; Thierry Breton, Commissioner for the Internal Market; Nicolas Schmit, Commissioner for Jobs and Social Rights
Youth	EYCS	Simona Kustec, Minister of Education, Science and Sport	Margaritis Schinas, Vice-President for Promoting the European Way of Life; Věra Jourová, Vice-President for Values and Transparency; Mariya Gabriel, Commissioner for Innovation, Research, Culture, Education and Youth; Thierry Breton, Commissioner for the Internal Market; Nicolas Schmit, Commissioner for Jobs and Social Rights
Sport	EYCS	Simona Kustec, Minister of Education, Science and Sport	Margaritis Schinas, Vice-President for Promoting the European Way of Life; Věra Jourová, Vice-President for Values and Transparency; Mariya Gabriel, Commissioner for Innovation, Research, Culture, Education and Youth; Thierry Breton, Commissioner for the Internal Market; Nicolas Schmit, Commissioner for Jobs and Social Rights
Culture	EYCS	Vasko Simoniti, Minister of Culture	Margaritis Schinas, Vice-President for Promoting the European Way of Life; Věra Jourová, Vice-President for Values and Transparency; Mariya Gabriel, Commissioner for Innovation, Research, Culture, Education and Youth; Thierry Breton, Commissioner for the Internal Market; Nicolas Schmit, Commissioner for Jobs and Social Rights

== National government ==
- President of the Republic Borut Pahor
- Prime Minister Janez Janša
- President of the National Assembly Igor Zorčič

Minister	Party	Council configurations (NPO - non-presiding officer)
Cabinet positions
Janez Janša; Prime Minister	EPP	European Council (NPO)
Matej Tonin; Deputy Prime Minister; Minister of Defence	EPP	FAC/Defence (NPO)
Zdravko Počivalšek; Deputy Prime Minister; Minister of Economic Development and Technology	ALDE	FAC/Trade; COMPET/Internal Market and Industry; COMPET/Research and Space (Space); EPSCO (Consumers)
Anže Logar; Minister of Foreign Affairs, Delegated Minister for the European Parliament	EPP	FAC (NPO)
Andrej Šircelj; Minister of Finance	EPP	ECOFIN
Aleš Hojs; Minister of the Interior	EPP	JHA/Home Affairs
Marjan Dikaučič; Minister of Justice	ALDE	JHA/Home Affairs
Jože Podgoršek; Minister of Agriculture, Forestry and Food	EDP	AGRIFISH
Janez Cigler Kralj; Minister of Labour, Family and Social Affairs and Equal Opportunities	EPP	EPSCO (Employment and Social Affairs)
Janez Poklukar; Minister of Health	-	EPSCO (Health)
Boštjan Koritnik; Minister of Public Administration	ALDE	COMPET/Internal Market and Industry TTE/Telecom
Simona Kustec; Minister of Education, Science and Sport	ALDE	COMPET/Research and Space (Research) EYCS (Education, Youth, Sport)
Vasko Simoniti; Minister of Culture	EPP	EYCS (Culture)
Jernej Vrtovec; Minister of Infrastructure	EPP	TTE/Energy; TTE/Transport
Andrej Vizjak; Minister of Environment and Spatial Planning	EPP	ENVI
Helena Jaklitsch; Minister without portfolio (Slovenian Abroad)	EPP	/
Zvone Černač; Minister without portfolio (Cohesion)	EPP	GAC/Cohesion
Mark Boris Andrijanič; Minister without portfolio (Digital Transformation)	-	COMPET/Internal Market and Industry
Non-Cabinet positions
Gašper Dovžan; State Secretary in the Ministry for Foreign Affairs, Delegated Minister for European Affairs	-	GAC
Stanislav Raščan; State Secretary in the Ministry of Foreign Affairs, Delegated Minister for Development	-	FAC/Development (NPO)
Irena Dermaž; Director-General for Budget, Delegated Minister for the EU Budget	-	ECOFIN/Budget

== Permanent mission to the EU ==
Function	Name (current office holders)
Permanent Representative; Head of Coreper II	Ambassador Iztok Jarc
Deputy Permanent Representative; Head of Coreper I	Ambassador Tamara Weingerl-Požar
Representative in the Political and Security Committee	Ambassador Veronika Bošković-Pohar
Antici; Coreper II and European Council	Vesna Hojnik
Mertens; Coreper I	Janja Pevec Živkovič
Nicolaidis; Political and Security Committee	Dejan Vidic
Military Representative	Brigadier Milan Žurman
Deputy Military Representative	Colonel Vincenc Arko

== Venues ==
Slovenian Presidency will be held at the following venues:

- Slovenia
  - Brdo Castle, Kranj
  - Brdo Congress Centre, Kranj
  - Presidential Palace, Ljubljana
  - National Assembly Building, Ljubljana
- Belgium
  - Justus Lipsius Building, Brussels
  - Europa Building, Brussels
  - European Parliament, Brussels
- Luxembourg
  - European Congress Centre, Luxembourg
- France
  - European Parliament, Strasbourg
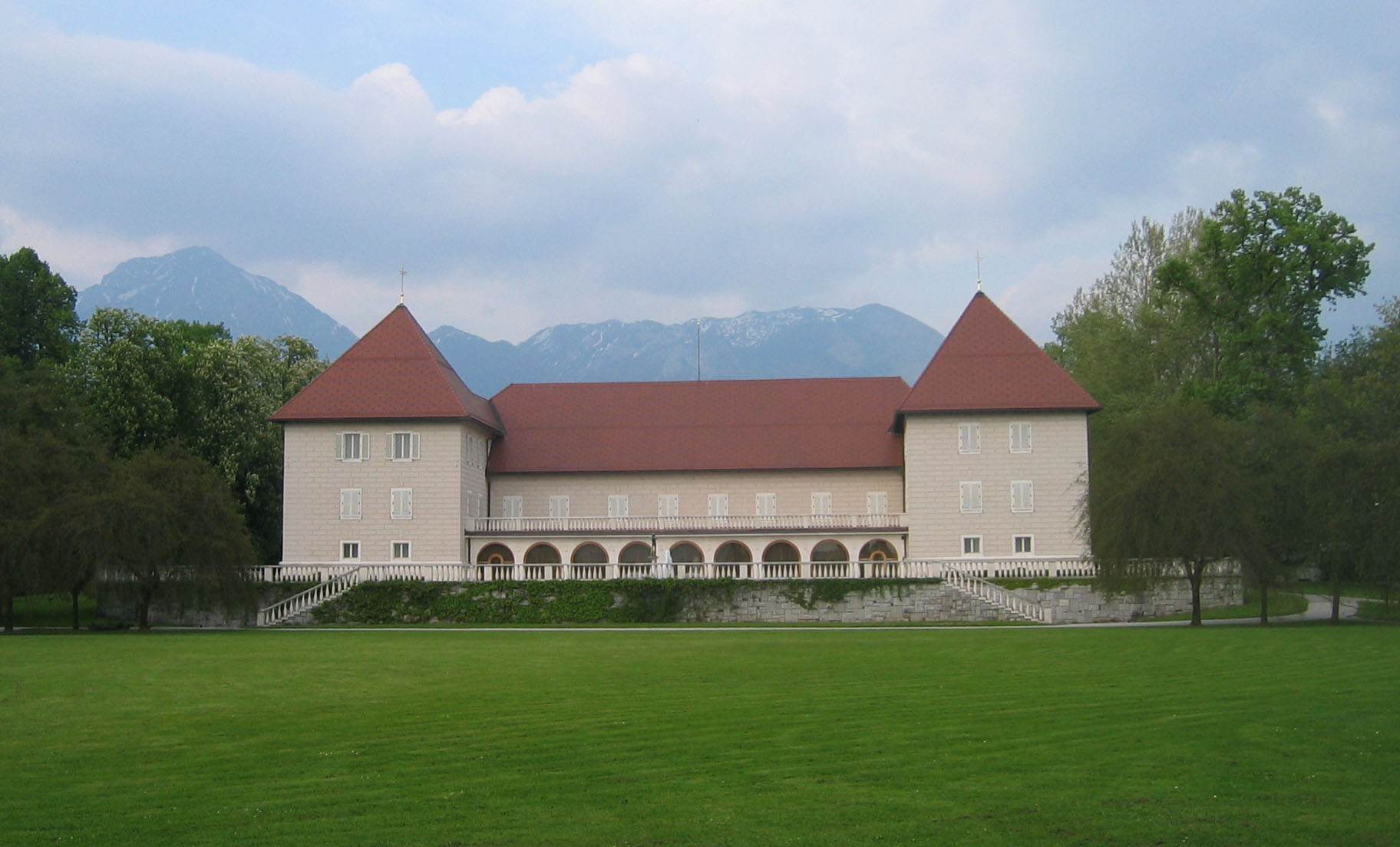
Brdo Castle, Kranj, Slovenia

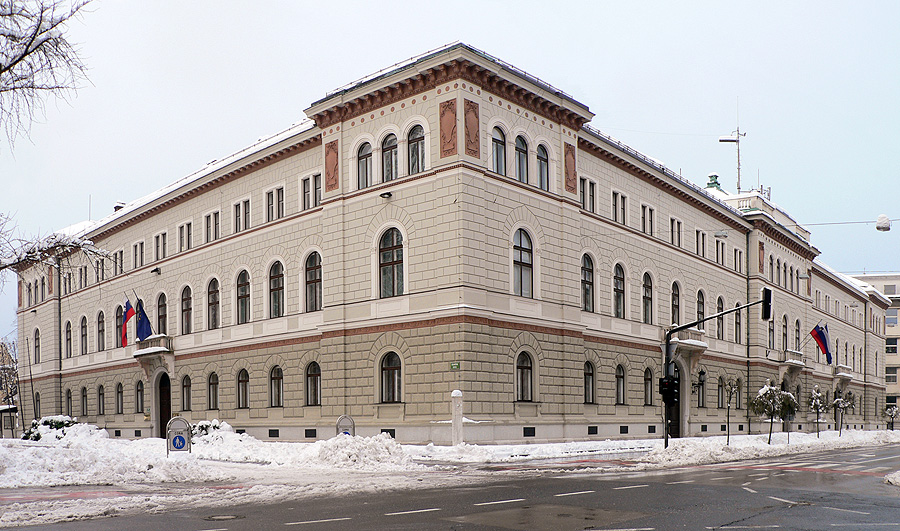
Presidential Palace, Ljubljana, Slovenia

National Assembly Building, Ljubljana, Slovenia

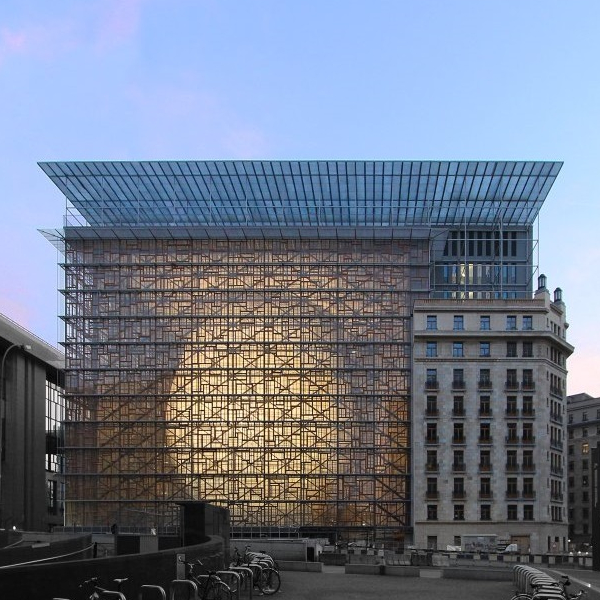
Europa Building, Brussels, Belgium

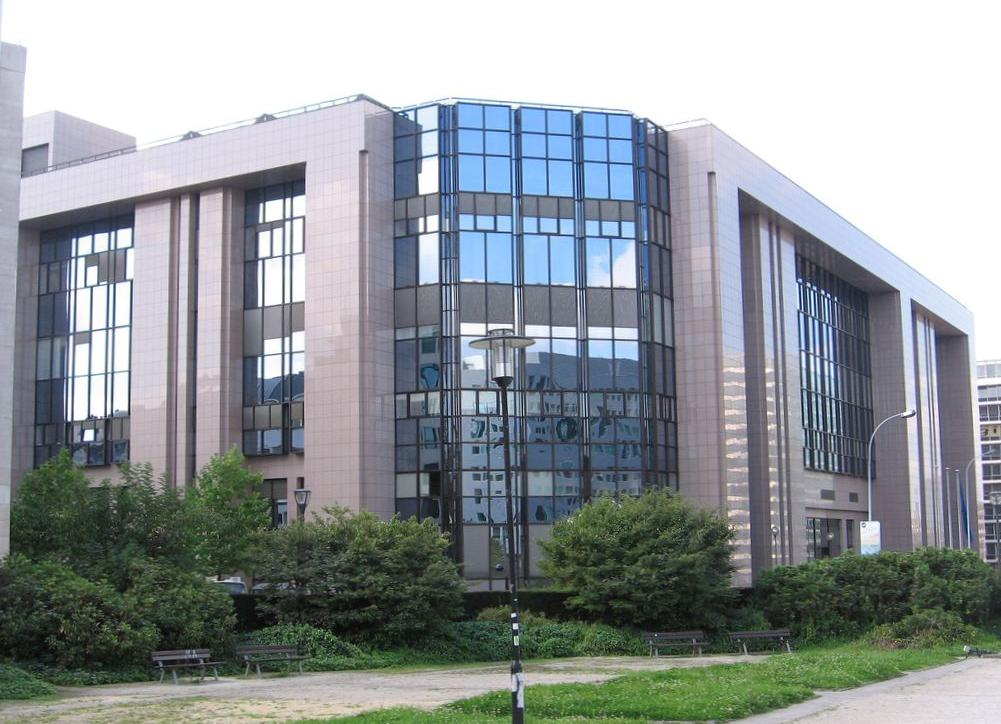
Justus Lipsius Building, Brussels, Belgium

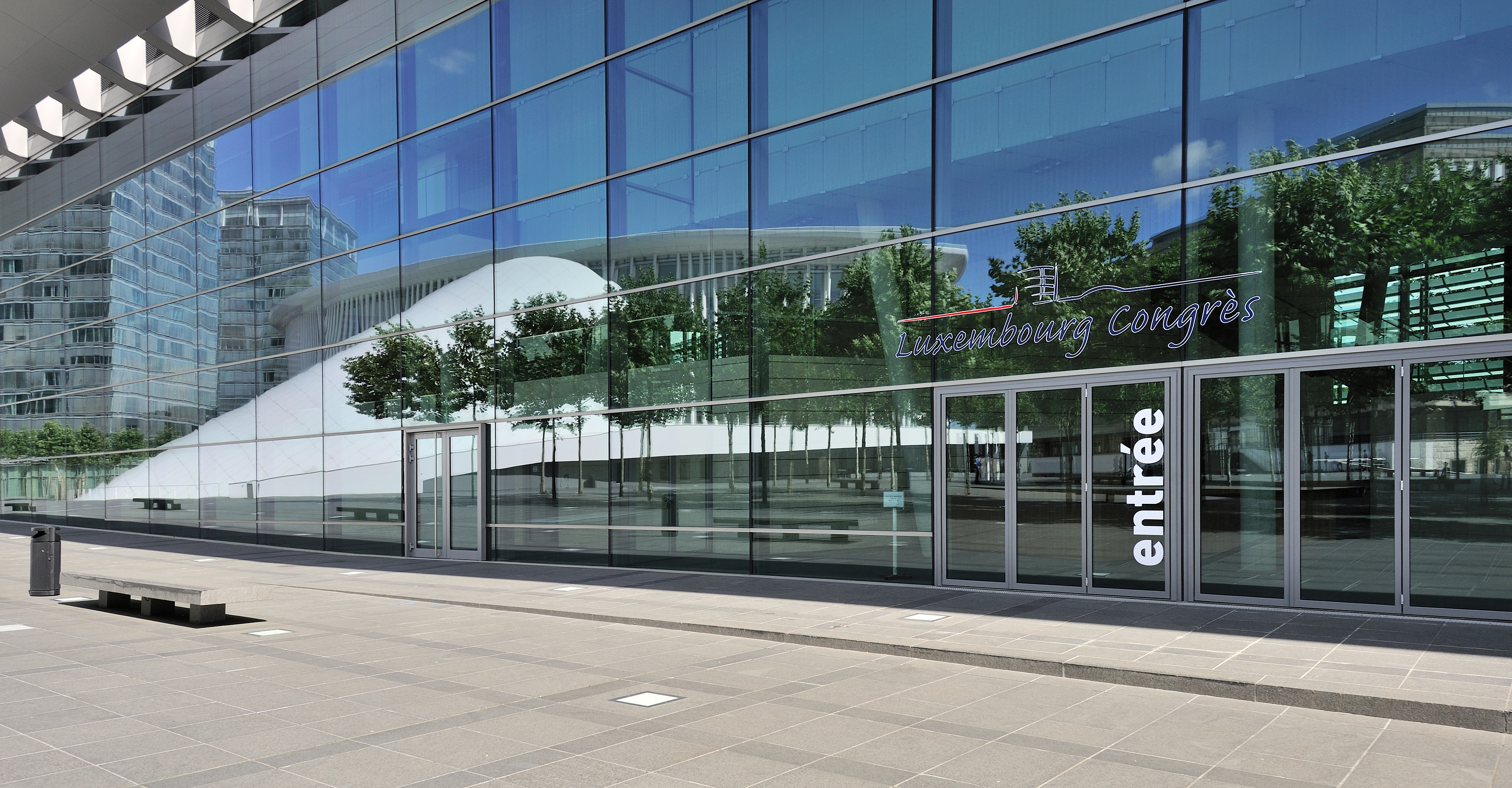
European Luxembourg Centre, Luxembourg, Luxembourg

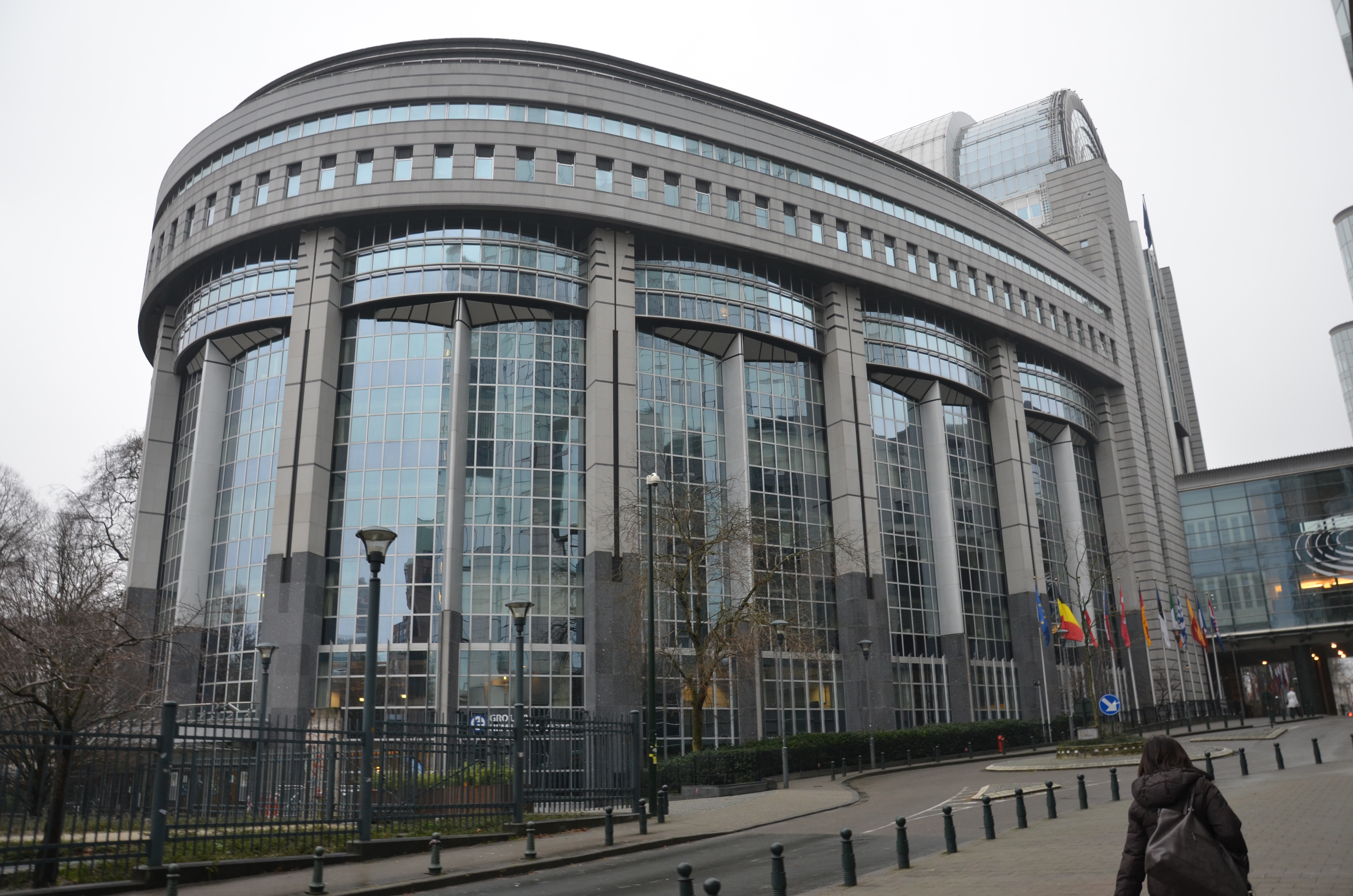
European Parliament, Brussels, Belgium
