= Vitalina Koval =

Ukrainian human rights activist

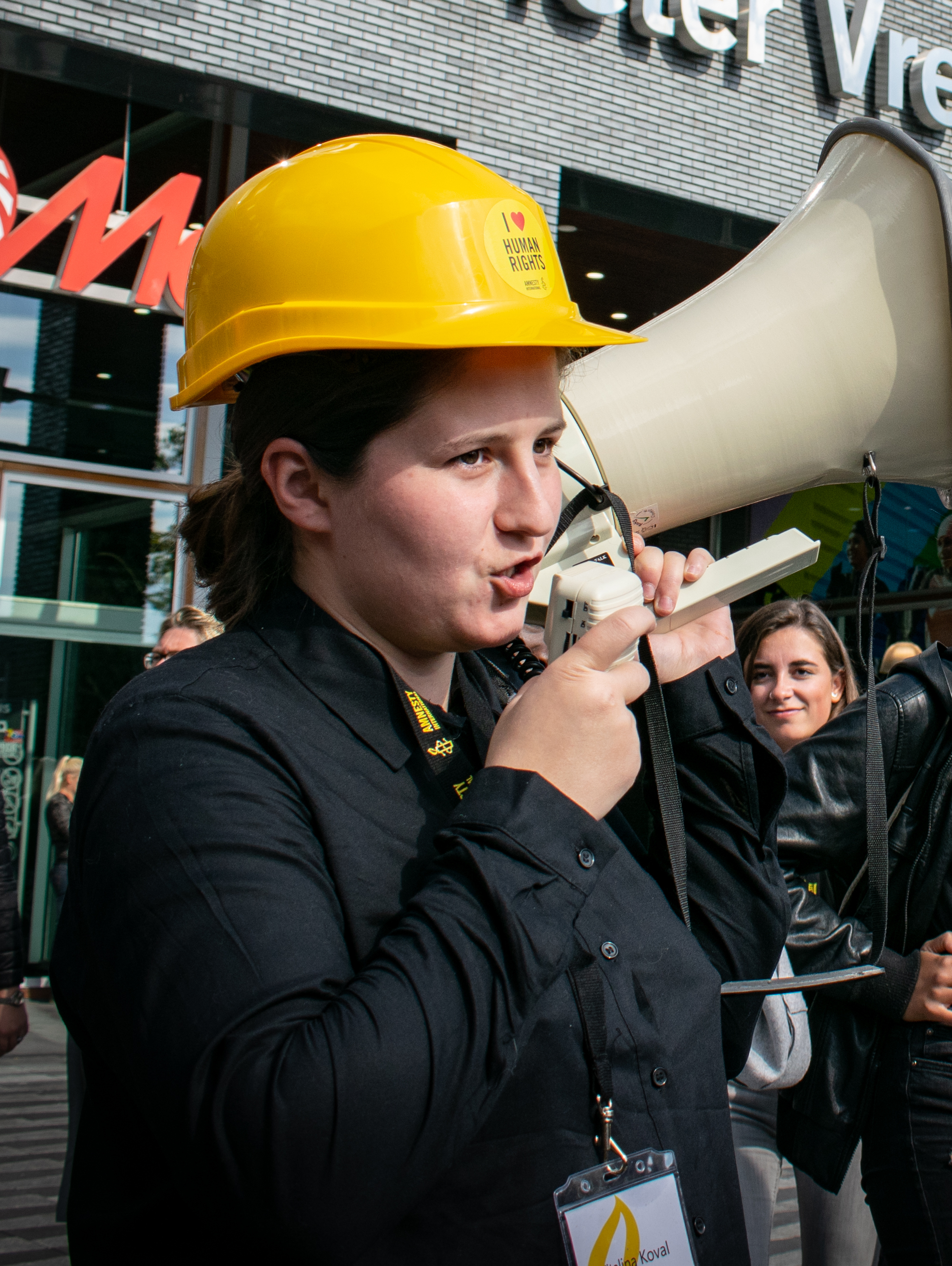
Koval at an Amnesty International event, 2018

Vitalina Koval is a Ukrainian human rights activist. She campaigns for women rights and LGBTI rights. She is from Uzhhorod.

== Activism ==
Vitalina Koval organised social events for LGBTI people but these were largely secret. She then set up a community centre for LGBTI people in Uzhhorod. The centre offered peer to peer support to LGBTI people.

Koval campaigns for the protection of minorities from hate crime She organised International Women's Day rallies in 2017 and in 2018. Karpatska Sich, a radical group attacked the rally in 2018. Vitalina Koval sustained an eye injury after being doused with paint. She reported this attack to the police. Two people are being prosecuted for this attack but the investigation to qualify the attack as a hate crime is ongoing. In 2018, Koval's case was featured in Amnesty International's Write for Rights campaign.

Koval and members of her group have received threats from far-right groups.

== International Human rights advocacy ==
Koval attended the Human Rights Summit in Paris. She also met EU high representative Federica Mogherini at the Gymnich meeting of EU foreign ministers in Helsinki in August 2019.
