= Tanja Fajon =

Slovenian politician (born 1971)

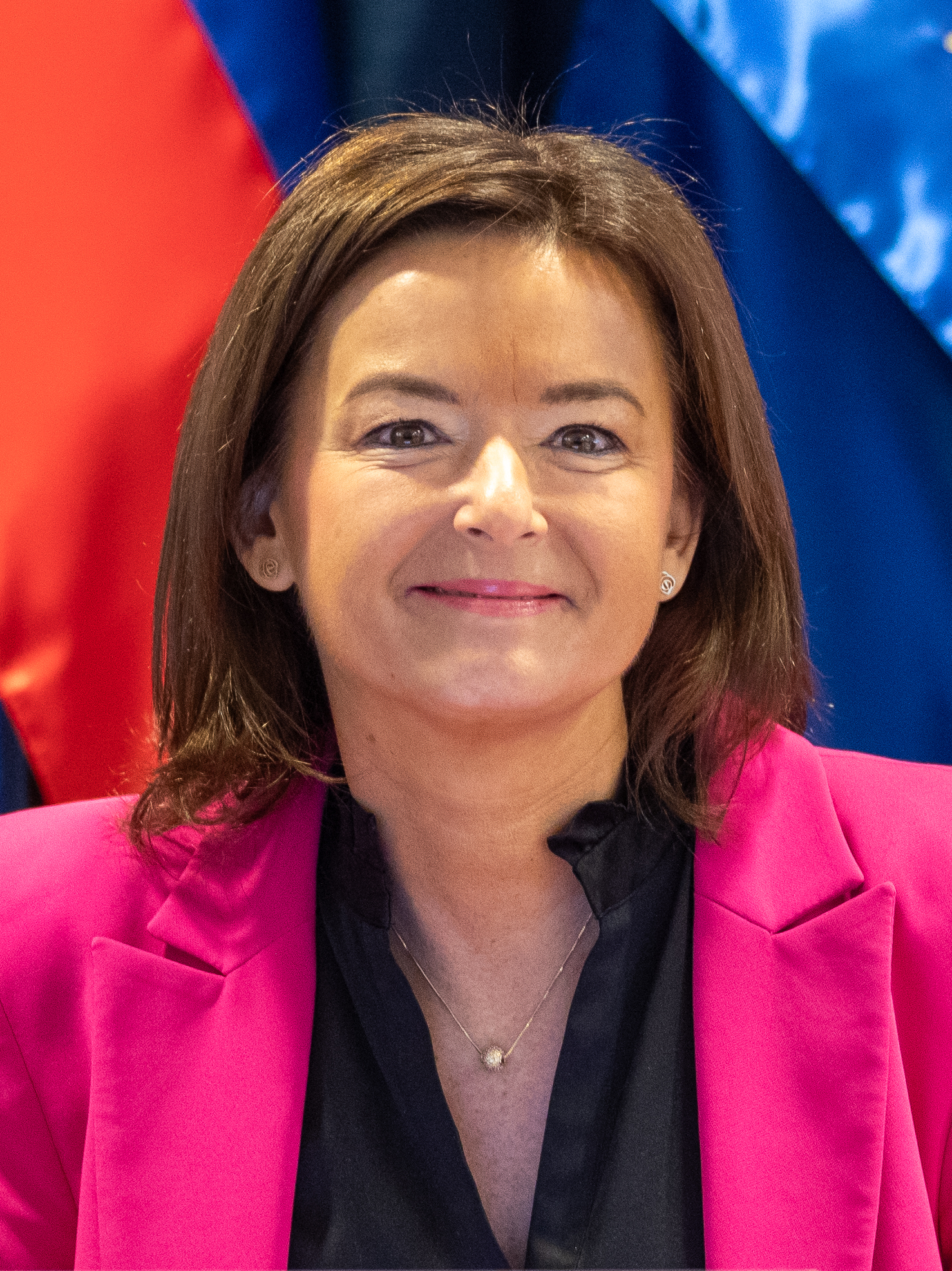
- Fajon in 2024

Deputy Prime Minister of Slovenia
- In office 1 June 2022 – 4 June 2026 Serving with Klemen Boštjančič; Luka Mesec; Matej Arčon (from 2024)
- Prime Minister: Robert Golob

Minister of Foreign and European Affairs
- In office 1 June 2022 – 4 June 2026
- Prime Minister: Robert Golob
- Preceded by: Anže Logar
- Succeeded by: Tone Kajzer

President of the Social Democrats
- In office 10 October 2020 – 13 April 2024
- Preceded by: Dejan Židan
- Succeeded by: Matjaž Han

Member of the European Parliament for Slovenia
- In office 1 July 2009 – 13 May 2022
- Succeeded by: Matjaž Nemec
European leadership roles
Vice-president of the Party of European Socialists
Incumbent
Assumed office 14 October 2022
President	Stefan Löfven
Vice-Chair of the Progressive Alliance of Socialists and Democrats
In office 1 July 2014 – 1 July 2019
President	Gianni Pittella; Udo Bullmann
Parliamentary offices
Member of the National Assembly
In office 13 May 2022 – 1 June 2022
Succeeded by	Martin Premk

Personal details
- Born: Tanja Anna Fajon; 9 May 1971 (age 55) Ljubljana, SR Slovenia, SFR Yugoslavia
- Party: Social Democrats
- Spouse: Veit-Ulrich Braun
- Education: University of Ljubljana (BA); Paris-Sud University (MA)

Tanja Anna Fajon (born 9 May 1971) is a Slovenian politician who has served as Minister of Foreign and European Affairs from 2022 to 2026. A member of the Social Democrats, she led the party from 2020 to 2024. Fajon was a Member of the European Parliament (MEP) for Slovenia until 2022, having been elected in 2009, 2014, and 2019.

Born in Ljubljana, Fajon attended the Poljane Grammar School and studied journalism at the Faculty of Social Sciences, University of Ljubljana, later earning a master’s degree in international politics at Paris-Sud University. Before entering politics, she worked as a journalist at Radio Glas Ljubljana and the newspaper Republika, and from 1996 at RTV Slovenia. She spent eight years as RTV Slovenia’s Brussels correspondent, closely covering Slovenia’s accession to the European Union in 2004 and the early years of its EU membership.

As an MEP, Fajon led the Slovenian delegation within the Progressive Alliance of Socialists and Democrats (S&D). She played a pivotal role as rapporteur on visa liberalisation for the Western Balkans and served as Vice-Chair of the S&D from 2014 to 2019 during her third term. She is the only Slovenian to be named twice among the 40 most influential MEPs by Politico Europe.

Following the 2022 parliamentary election, Fajon was briefly elected as a member of the National Assembly before joining the 15th Government of Slovenia led by Prime Minister Robert Golob. As party leader during the government’s formation, she personally chose to serve as Minister of Foreign and European Affairs.

== Early life and education ==
Born in Ljubljana on 9 May 1971, Tanja Fajon is the daughter of Nevenka “Neva” Fajon (1943–2021), a renowned Slovenian film editor who worked on the Oscar-nominated film When I Close My Eyes (1993) and at RTV Slovenia, and Bogdan Fajon, a journalist and editor also employed at RTV Slovenia. She has an older brother, Sašo Fajon, a composer and musician known for co-writing Prisluhni mi, which represented Slovenia at the Eurovision Song Contest in 1995; he suffered a heart attack in 2016.

After completing Poljane Grammar School in 1990, Fajon earned a bachelor’s degree in journalism from the Faculty of Social Sciences, University of Ljubljana in 1996. While working at RTV Slovenia, she completed a master’s degree in international politics at the College of Interdisciplinary Studies, Paris-Sud University in 2005. She later undertook a graduate course in management at the IEDC-Bled School of Management until 2016.

== Career in journalism ==
Fajon began her journalism career as a journalist and assistant editor at Radio Glas Ljubljana from 1991 to 1995. In 1993, she also worked as a reporter and writer for the Slovenian daily newspaper Republika. From 1996 to 2001, she was a local journalist at RTV Slovenia, before becoming a correspondent for RTV Slovenia in Brussels, a role she held from 2001 to 2009, closely following Slovenia’s accession to the European Union in 2004. During this period, she also contributed as a reporter for CNN from 1995 to 2001.

== Political career ==
=== Member of the European Parliament, 2009–2022 ===
In the 2009 European Parliament elections in Slovenia, Fajon was elected as a member of the Social Democrats (SD). During her first term, she served as vice-chairwoman of the European Parliament delegation for Croatia until the country joined the European Union. She was also a member of the Committee on Organised Crime, Corruption and Money Laundering (CRIM), Committee on Civil Liberties, Justice and Home Affairs (LIBE), and the Delegation for relations with the United States.

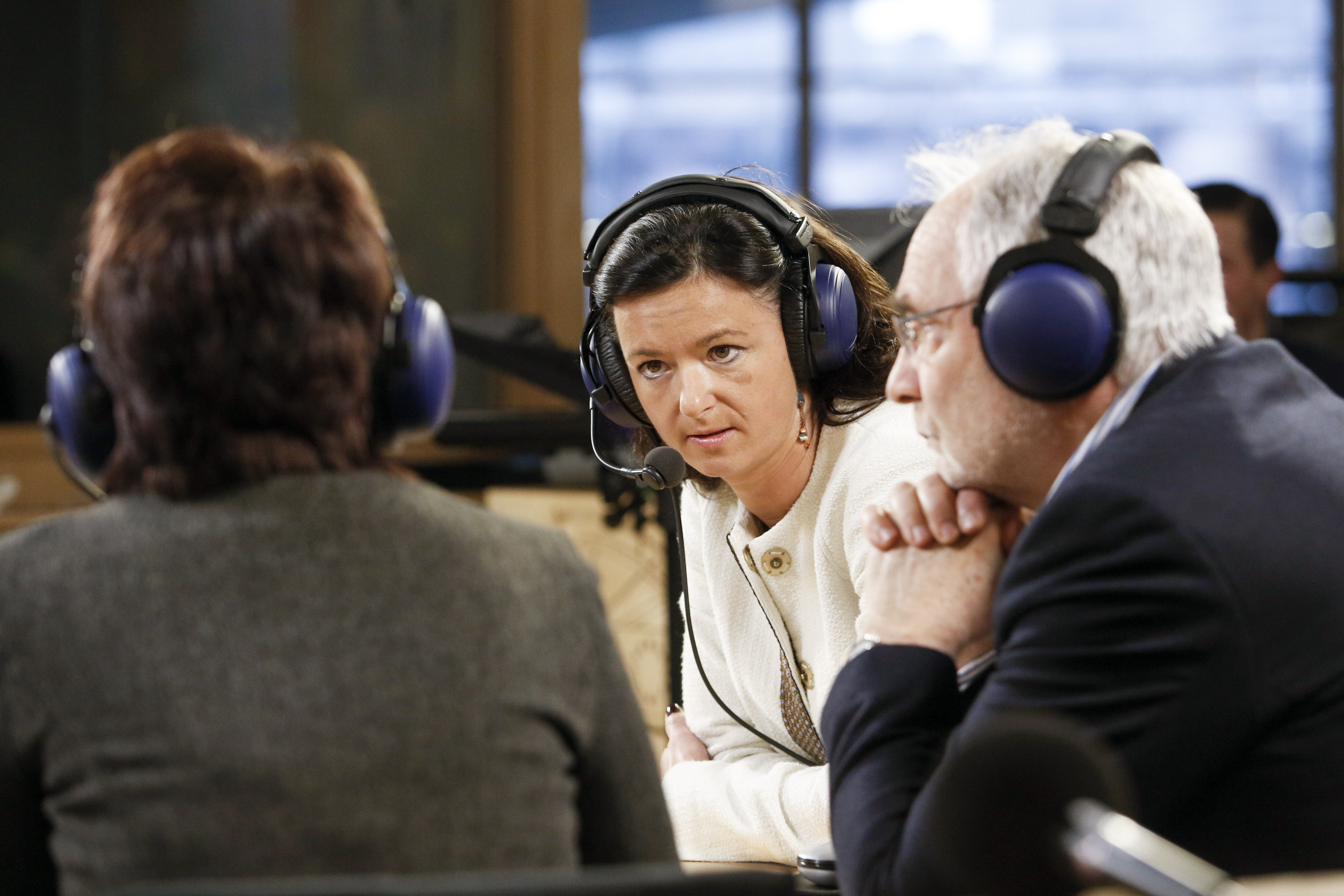
Fajon in the European Parliament in 2014

Fajon was reelected in 2014, receiving more votes than the list leader, Igor Lukšič. She was proposed as Slovenia’s nominee for the European Commission under Jean-Claude Juncker, but the Slovenian government ultimately nominated Violeta Bulc. In her second term she served on LIBE, Delegation to the Euronest Parliamentary Assembly, and the Delegation for relations with Bosnia and Herzegovina and Kosovo (DSEE). Fajon also served as Vice-Chair of the S&D during this term. By 2016, she was considered one of Slovenia’s most popular political figures according to national opinion polls.

Following the 2019 European elections, Fajon played a central role in EP-mediated interparty dialogue in Serbia, serving as chair of the delegation for relations with Serbia. She was also a member of the Committee on Foreign Affairs (AFET) and participated in a cross-party working group tasked with drafting the European Parliament’s five-year work program on the rule of law, borders, and migration.

Throughout her EP career, Fajon acted as rapporteur for the visa liberalisation process for the Western Balkans. She played a key role in enabling citizens of Albania to travel freely within the Schengen Area, marking a major step toward Albania’s EU accession. In recognition of her efforts, a café in Tirana was named in her honor in 2010. She also contributed to visa liberalisation for Bosnia and Herzegovina and Moldova.

On May 5, a delegation of the Social Democrats, with then-vice president Tanja Fajon, paid homage to the monument to Boris Kidrič in Ljubljana, as they wrote, in memory of the founding of the then-composed Kidrič government and pledged to "secure freedom, peace, and justice." The act aroused disapproval in part of the public, as the delegation was thereby paying homage to Kidrič, who during and after World War II was involved in committing crimes, including extrajudicial killings of Slovenes and the persecution of the German minority.

=== Party politics ===
Tanja Fajon served for several years as vice-chairwoman of the Social Democrats (SD) and as chair of the SD Council for Foreign Policy. On 28 May 2020, following the resignation of Dejan Židan as party president, Fajon assumed the role of acting president. During the handover, Židan publicly endorsed Fajon, calling on the party council to formally appoint her as president and stating that he viewed her as a potential future prime minister.

In the 2022 parliamentary elections, the party experienced a decline, reducing its number of seats from ten to seven. Fajon herself was elected as a member of parliament, which led to the end of her term in the European Parliament on 13 May 2022, succeeded by Matjaž Nemec. Two days after the elections, SD vice-president Jernej Pikalo resigned.

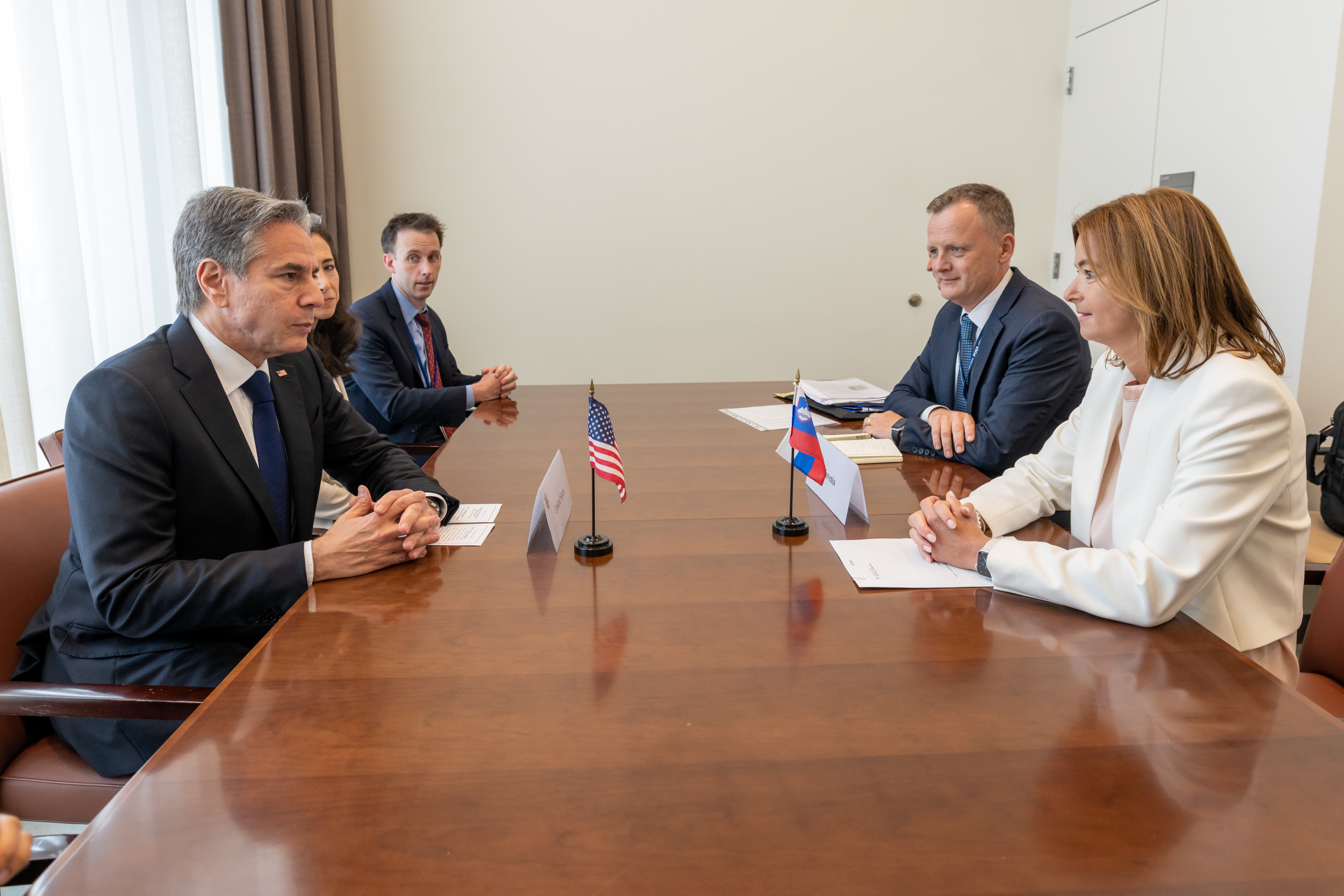
Fajon meets with US secretary of state Antony Blinken in 2022

At the party congress on 8 October 2022 in Ptuj, Fajon was confirmed as the party president, running unopposed. She remained in this role until 13 April 2024, when Matjaž Han was elected as the new leader. On 14 October 2022, she was also elected vice-president of the Party of European Socialists at its congress in Berlin.

=== Foreign minister, 2022–2026 ===
Following the formation of the 15th Government of Slovenia, Prime Minister Robert Golob allowed coalition party leaders to choose their ministries. Tanja Fajon selected the Ministry of Foreign Affairs, and was confirmed by the parliamentary Committee on Foreign Affairs on 30 May 2022, receiving nine votes in favor and six against. She officially assumed office on 1 June 2022. Among her early priorities, she proposed renaming the ministry to the Ministry of Foreign and European Affairs and emphasized returning to a focus on core EU states.

Shortly after taking office, Fajon named one of the ministry’s conference halls after Slovenian writer Boris Pahor. She also intervened regarding a potential reduction of RTV Slovenia correspondents, sending a letter to Director-general Andrej Grah Whatmough, which the opposition party SDS criticized as political pressure.

Early in her term, Fajon received three open letters regarding Slovenia’s stance on the Russian invasion of Ukraine, advocating different approaches from peace negotiations to firm support for Ukrainian defense. She invited the authors to the first meeting of the Strategic Council for Foreign Policy.

In September 2022, the ministry faced controversy when a diplomatic cable supporting the presidential candidacy of Nataša Pirc Musar was leaked by the ambassador in the U.S., prompting SDS to file a motion of no confidence against Fajon, which failed (22 votes in favor, 52 against).

On 24 January 2023, the ministry was officially renamed the Ministry of Foreign and European Affairs during a government reconstruction. Fajon also continued Slovenia’s campaign for a non-permanent seat on the UN Security Council, appointing special envoy Franc But to support the effort. Slovenia was elected with 153 votes in the UN General Assembly.

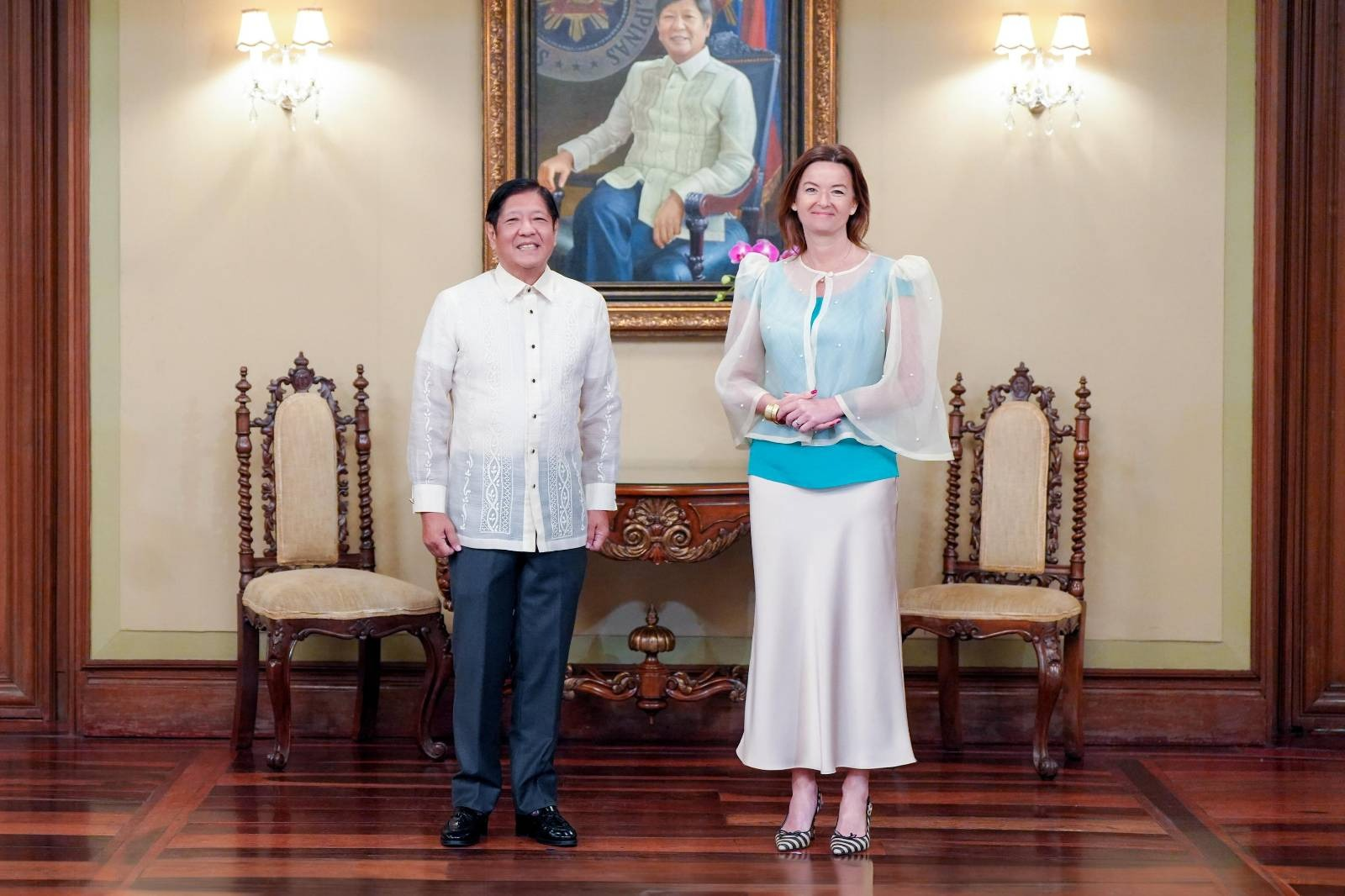
Fajon meets with Philippine president Bongbong Marcos in Manila in 2025

On 4 June 2024, Slovenia recognized the State of Palestine as an independent and sovereign state, becoming the 147th UN member to do so. Diplomatic relations were formally established the following day through the delivery of a verbal note to the Palestinian ambassador in Vienna. This decision followed similar actions by Spain, Ireland, and Norway.

On 15 July 2025, the EU's top diplomat Kaja Kallas and the foreign ministers of the EU member states decided not to take any action against Israel over alleged Israeli war crimes in the Gaza war and settler violence in the West Bank. Fajon posted on social media: "It is disappointing that there is no EU consensus to act on the June determination that Israel is violating Article 2 of the [EU-Israel Association Agreement], concerning human rights."

== Personal life ==
Fajon lives between Ljubljana and Brussels with her husband Veit-Ulrich Braun, a German journalist. Other than Slovenian, she speaks English, German, French, and Croatian.

== Other activities ==
- European Council on Foreign Relations (ECFR), Member
- Friends of Europe, member of the board of trustees

== Honors and awards ==
- Bosnia and Herzegovina: Tanja Fajon was named Person of the Year 2009 in Bosnia and Herzegovina, for her endeavors to abolish visa requirements for the Western Balkan citizens.
- Albania: On 22 October 2010, Tanja Fajon received a copy of the key of the city of Tirana, on the occasion of state visit to Albania.
- Bosnia and Herzegovina: In December 2010, Tanja Fajon was the first to receive an honorary doctorate from the American University in Bosnia and Herzegovina in Sarajevo.
- Bosnia and Herzegovina: In May 2014, Tanja Fajon received a Key of Heart from citizens of Bosnia and Herzegovina in Sarajevo.
- EU: On 10 September 2019, Tanja Fajon received "Award for the Contribution to the European Integration of the Region" by portal European Western Balkans for "her unwavering commitment to the European future of the Western Balkans (WB) amidst rising challenges, continued representation of the value-based EU in the region, as well as the principled promotion of democracy, freedom and tolerance"Award for the Contribution to the European Integration of the Region".
