= Verica Trstenjak =

Slovenian doctor of laws and professor of European law

Verica Trstenjak (born December 9, 1962) is a Slovenian Doctor of Laws and Professor of European Law based in Vienna, Austria. From 2006 to 2012 she has been an Advocate General at the Court of Justice of the European Union in Luxembourg (CJEU), from 2004 to 2006 judge of the General Court.

== Early professional career ==
Verica Trstenjak passed her bar exam in 1987 and obtained her doctor's degree at the Faculty of Law of the University of Ljubljana in 1995. She worked as a head of the legal service at the Ministry of Science and Technology of the Republic of Slovenia between 1994 and 1996, and as State Secretary at the same ministry between 1996 and 2000. In 2000 she held a post of a Secretary-General of the Government of the Republic of Slovenia.

She has cooperated also with non-governmental organizations in Slovenia and contributed to preparation of Foundations Act. From 1997 to 2000 she was also a leader of the working group 17 for the accession negotiations of Slovenia with EU.

== Work at the Court of Justice of the EU ==
She worked as a judge at the Court of First Instance of the European Communities (now General Court) from 7 July 2004 to 6 October 2006 and was an Advocate General at the Court of Justice of the European Union from 7 October 2006 to 28 November 2012.

== Academic work ==
Verica Trstenjak pursued her doctoral studies at the University of Zürich (Universität Zürich), the Institute of Comparative Law of the University of Vienna (Institut für Rechtsvergleichung der Universität Wien), the Max Planck Institute for Private International Law in Hamburg (Max-Planck-Institut für Internationales Privatrecht), and the Free University of Amsterdam (Vrije Universiteit Amsterdam). In 1996 she became a professor for Theory of Law and State and Private Law, and in 2006 a full professor (venia legendi) for Civil and European Law.

She was a visiting professor at the universities of Vienna (Universität Wien), Freiburg (Germany) (Universität Freiburg), Bucerius Law School in Hamburg and at the universities in Heidelberg, Bonn, Salzburg, Zürich, Liechtenstein, Amsterdam (University of Amsterdam), Luxembourg, Haag and Ferrara. She gave various lectures outside the EU at the universities in Sydney, Los Angeles, San Francisco, Tokio, Seul, Astana, Aruba and New York. Until 2006 she was a member of the Study Group on a European Civil Code.

She has published more than 300 legal articles and several books on European and private law; she gives speeches at numerous international conferences in Slovenia and abroad (e.g. conferences on Common Frame of Reference (Münster, Osnabrück, Trier); Luxembourg: European Jurists' Forum 2011; Trier: Jahrestagung der Gesellschaft für Rechtsvergleichung 2011; Berlin: Humboldt-Universität, 2012; Salzburg: 24. Europäische Notarentage, 2012; Barcelona: European Jurists' Forum 2013, Vienna: General Reporter at IACL - International Academy of Comparative Law, 2014; Amsterdam: Keynote Speaker at International Conference of Consumer Law, 2015); Kazakhstan: International Notary Conference, 2018; Madrid: European Women Lawyers Association (EWLA), 2019; Salzburg: European Academy of Science, 2023.

After the end of her mandate at the CJEU, she was appointed as a university professor for European law at the University of Vienna, Faculty of Law (limited to five years) in 2013. Currently, she teaches EU law and fundamental rights at the LL.M. programme of the University of Vienna, at the Sigmund Freud Private University Vienna, University of Ljubljana, New university, Slovenia.

She was a visiting professor at the Masters Study (Litigation in EU Intellectual Property Rights) at the University of Luxembourg until 2013 and University of Maribor. She teaches at the summer schools in Salzburg (University of Salzburg), Strobl (University of Vienna) and Alpbach (Leopold-Franzens-University-Innsbruck).

== Membership in academic and legal societies and international organizations ==
In 2012 she was appointed external scientific member of the newly established Max Planck Institute Luxembourg for International, European and Regulatory Procedural Law in Luxembourg. She is a member of the Advisory Committee (a kind of arbitration court) of the international law organisation Energy Community (since 2015), Substitute member of the Venice Commission (until 2024) and member of the Permanent Court of Arbitration at The Hague (since 2019), Vienna International Arbitral Centre (VIAC) (since 2019), International Centre for Settlement of Investment Disputes (ICSID) (since 2019) and member of the Bureau of the Tribunal at the Organization for Security and Co-operation in Europe (OSCE) (since 2019). From 2017 until 2022 she was a member of the Management and executive board of the FRA - European Union Agency for Fundamental Rights. In 2024, she was appointed to the Administrative Board of Review at the European Central Bank.

Member of Editorial boards of a number of legal periodicals in Slovenia and abroad:

- European Law Review (ELR)
- European Journal of Consumer Law
- Zeitschrift für Europäisches Unternehmens- und Verbraucherrecht (EUVR)
- Zeitschrift für Europäisches Privatrecht (ZEuP) (correspondence member)
- European Journal of Commercial Contract Law (EJCCL)
- Oxford Encyclopedia of EU Law
- Pravnik

Member of Scientific boards:

- Member of the advisory board in Vienna, Centre international de formation européenne (CIFE) (since 2013)
- International Advisory Board of the Alexander von Humboldt-Foundation (from October 2015 until 2019)
- Scientific Advisory Board at the Faculty of Law of the University of Vienna
- Beirat des Instituts für Stiftungsrecht und das Recht der Non-Profit-Organisationen (Bucerius Law School) in Hamburg until 2015
- Advisory Council for European Law, Ministry of Foreign Affairs Austria (since 2013)

Member of a number of Lawyers' Associations:

- European Academy of Science and Arts (since 2018)
- Academia Europaea
- Slovensko društvo za Evropsko pravo (Slovene Association for European Law) (president) and International Federation of EU Law (FIDE; Member of the Steering Committee)
- European Law Institute (founding member)
- Zivilrechtslehrervereinigung
- International Academy of Comparative Law (IACL)
- l'Association Henri Capitant des Amis de la Culture Juridique Française
- Gesellschaft für Rechtsvergleichung
- Forum Alpbach
- European Women Lawyers Association (EWLA), Slovenia, President

== Awards and honors ==
In 2003 she won a prize of the Association of Slovene Lawyers, 'Lawyer of the Year 2003'.

In 2020 she was awarded the Austrian Cross of Honour for Science and Art, 1st Class by the Federal President Dr. Alexander Van der Bellen for her exceptional scientific merits in the field of EU law and for her contribution to the deepening of relations between Austria and Slovenia.

Hans-Wolfgang Micklitz, professor at the European University Institute in Florence, named Verica Trstenjak as "the founding mother of European private law."

== Selection of some relevant published articles ==
- Trstenjak Verica: Human Rights in the Digital Era: From Digital Practice to Digital Law and Case Law, in: Miller Katharina, Wendt Karen, The Fourth Industrial Revolution and Its Impact on Ethics, Springer (2021).
- Trstenjak Verica: Law and Medicine: the Influence of Fundamental Rights on the Corona-crisis and the Influence of the Corona-crisis on Fundamental Rights in the EU, Medicine, Law & Society, (2021) 14(2).
- Trstenjak Verica/Weingerl Petra (ed): The Influence of Human Rights and Basic Rights in Private Law, Springer International Switzerland (2016).
- Trstenjak Verica: Les mécanismes de recours collectif et leur importance pour la protection des consommateurs, in La Cour de justice de l'Union européenne sous la présidence de Vassilios Skouris (2003–2015), Liber amicorum Vassilios Skouris (2015), pp. 681–696.
- Trstenjak Verica/Beysen Erwin: The Growing Overlap of Fundamental Freedoms and Fundamental Rights in the Case-law of the CJEU, European Law Review (2013) 38, S. 293-315 (Social Sciences Citation Index)
- Procedural Aspects of European Consumer Protection Law and the Case Law of the CJEU, European Review of Private Law, No. 2/ 2013, S. 451–478
- Pravo EU, Ustavno, procesno in gospodarsko pravo EU, GV Založba, Ljubljana, 2012, 840 S, together with Maja Brkan
- Trstenjak, Verica, Beysen, Erwin, European consumer protection law: curia semper dabit remedium?. Published in: Common market law review, 2011, Vol. 48, No. 1, pp. 95–124.
- Das Verhältnis zwischen Immaterialgüterrecht und Datenschutzrecht in der Informationsgesellschaft im Lichte der Rechtsprechung des Europäischen Gerichtshofs. Published in: Gewerblicher Rechtsschutz und Urheberrecht, Internationaler Teil (GRUR Int) (published in 2012)
- Verbraucherschutzrecht und die rechtlichen Probleme des Internetverkaufs in der Rechtsprechung des EuGH. Published in: Borić, Lurger, Schwarzenegger, Terlitza (ed.), Öffnung und Wandel – Die internationale Dimension des Rechts II, Festschrift für Prof. Willibald Posch, LexisNexis, Wien, 2011, pp. 787–798.
- L'importance du Code civil et des Provinces illyriennes pour la Slovénie. Published in: Revue international de droit comparé, No. 3/2011, pp. 720–725.
- Von der Mindest- zur Vollharmonisierung: Bedeutung für die Rechtsprechung des EuGH. Published in: Welser, Rudolf (ed.), Konsumentenschutz in Zentral- und Osteuropa, Wien, 2010, pp. 205–219.
- Private law developments in Slovenia: a European perspective. Published in: Jessel-Holst, Christa (ed.), Kulms, Rainer (ed.), Trunk, Alexander (ed.). Private law in Eastern Europe: autonomous developments or legal transplants?, (Materialien zum ausländischen und internationalen Privatrecht, 50). Tübingen: M. Siebeck, cop. 2010, pp. 123–147.
- Les difficultés d'une interprétation et d'une application unitaires du droit communautaire. Published in: Le contrat en Europe aujourd'hui et demain (ed. Rémy Cabrillac, Denis Mazeaud, André Prüm), Société de législation comparée, Paris, 2008, pp. 147–175.
- Slowenisches Zivilrecht: Vom ABGB auf dem Weg zum europäischen Zivilgesetzbuch? Published in: Privatrechtsentwicklung in Zentral- und Osteuropa (ed. Rudolf Welser), MANZ'sche Verlag, Wien, 2008, p. 101–114.
- Die Auslegung privatrechtlicher Richtlinien durch den EuGH: ein Rechtsprechungsbericht unter Berücksichtigung des Common Frame of Reference. Published in: Zeitschrift für Europäisches Privatrecht, 2007, pp. 145–160.
- La Slovenia e l'armonizzazione del diritto sloveno con quello dell'Unione europea: il diritto civile sloveno e il nuovo diritto delle obbligazioni. Published in: Contratto e impresa. Europa, IX (2004), No. 1, pp. 265–292.

== Selection of relevant cases ==
1. Consumer protection

- Pénzügyi Lízing (C-137/08) – Unfair terms in consumer contracts
- Aventis Pasteur (C-358/08) – Liability for defective products
- Pammer (C 585/08) and Hotel Alpenhof (C 144/09) – Jurisdiction in civil and commercial matters
- Quelle (C-404/06) – Absence of duty to pay compensation to the vendor for the use of defective goods in case of rescission of the contract
- VTB-VAB (C-261/07) and Galatea (C-299/07) – Combined offers
- Mediaprint Zeitungs- und Zeitschriftenverlag (C-540/08) – Combined offers

2. Social and labour law

- Schultz-Hoff (C-350/06) and Stringer (C-520/06); KHS (C-214/10) – Right to paid annual leave of sick employees
- Dominguez (C-282/10) – The doctrine of ‚Drittwirkung der Grundrechte’, general principles of law
- CLECE (C-463/09) – Transfers of undertakings

3. Intellectual property law

- SGAE (C-467/08) – Compensation of intellectual property right holders
- Painer (C-145/10)
- Fachverband der Buch- und Medienwirtschaft/LIBRO (C-531/07)
- Phonographic Performance (Ireland) (C-162/10) – copyright and related rights (rights of performers and phonogram producers)
- SCF Consorzio Fonografici (C-135/10) – copyright and related rights (rights of performers and phonogram producers)

4. Corporate law

- Audiolux (C-101/08) – Criteria for the recognition of general principles of law
- Idryma Typou (C-81/09) – Criteria of demarcation between the freedom of establishment and the freedom of movement of capital
- Commission/Spain (C-338/06) – Right of pre-emption for shares and for bonds convertible into shares

5. Public procurement

- Commission/Germany (C-503/04) – Obligation to rescind a contract
- Commission/Germany (C-536/07) – Köln Messe
- Commission/Germany (C-160/08) – Ambulance services
- Commission/Germany (C-271/08) – Collective agreement on the conversion of earnings for local authority employees
- Commission/Austria (C-28/09) – Sectoral traffic prohibition for lorries

6. Immigration and asylum law

- NS (C-411/10) and ME (C-493/10) – Right of asylum in the European Union

7. Health policy

- Hecht-Pharma (C-140/07) – Classification as a medicinal product
- MSD Sharp & Dohme (C-316/09) – Advertising of medicinal products on the Internet
- Commission/Portugal (C-255/09) – Cross-border healthcare services

8. Other

- Koller (C-118/09) – Education and training of lawyers (Mutual recognition of diplomas)

== See also ==
- Prof. Dr. Verica Trstenjak received the Austrian Cross of Honour for Science and Art, 1st Class
- Verica Trstenjak Homepage, Sigmund Freud University Vienna
- Verica Trstenjak Homepage, University of Vienna
- Pressemitteilung Nr. 87/06 des EuGH vom 6. Oktober 2006 zur Ernennung zur Generalanwältin (PDF document; 117 kB)
- List of members of the European Court of Justice
