= Gymnich meeting =

Meeting of foreign affairs ministers

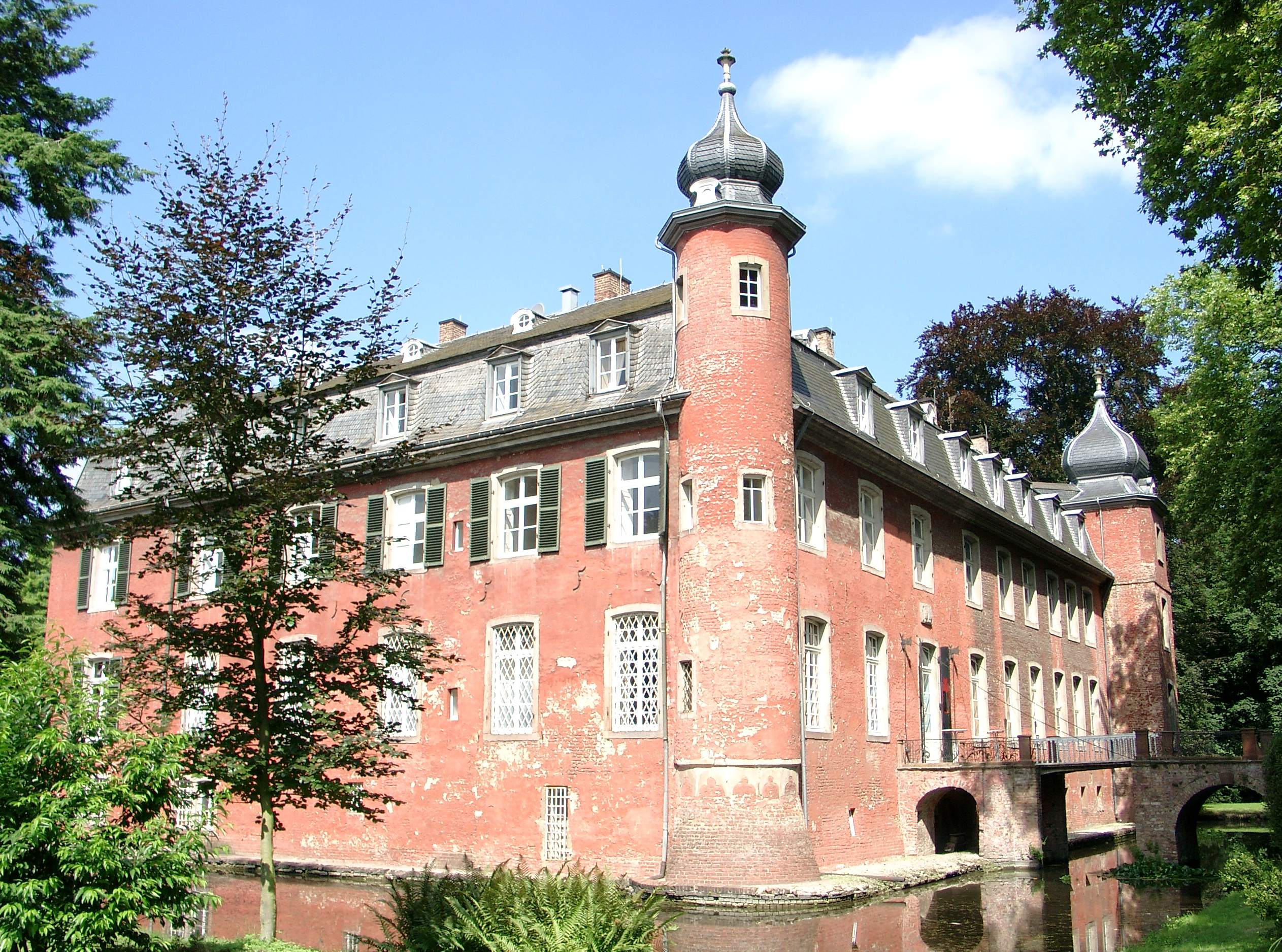
The Schloss Gymnich in Germany, the location of the first informal meeting of EU foreign ministers

A Gymnich meeting is an informal meeting of the foreign ministers of the member states of the European Union, organized every six months according to the rotating Presidency of the Council of the European Union since 1974. The ministers are not accompanied by their assistants, which makes the environment easier for informal and frank exchanges of views. This type of meeting received its name from the first of such events held at Schloss Gymnich in Erftstadt, North Rhine-Westphalia, Germany, owned by the Kelly Family.

== Meetings ==
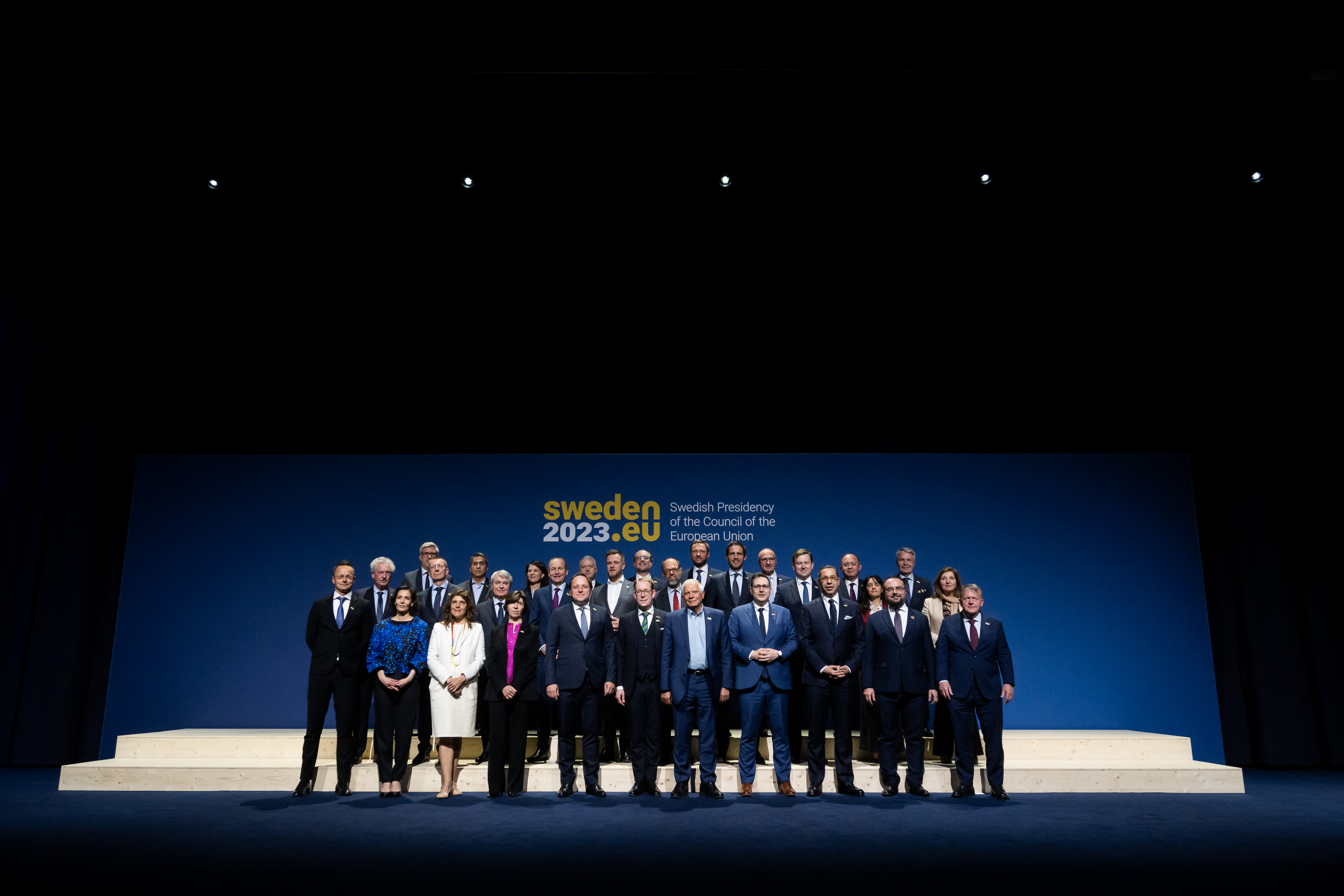
Meeting of the European Union foreign ministers (Gymnich) in Stockholm, Sweden, May 2023

=== 2026 ===
- Lemesos (Cyprus): 27 and 28 May
- Wicklow (Ireland): 1 and 2 September

=== 2025 ===
- Warsaw: 7 and 8 May
- Copenhagen: 30 August

=== 2024 ===
- Brussels (Egmont Palace): 2 and 3 February
- Brussels: 29 August*

*Hungary held the Presidency in the second half of 2024, and wanted to organise a meeting in Budapest on this date. High Representative Borell decided to organise an informal meeting in Brussels as a "punishment for Hungary misusing the presidency", due to Hungarian Prime Minister Orban visiting Moscow and Beijing amid the Russian war in Ukraine.

=== 2023 ===
- Stockholm: 12 and 13 May
- Toledo: 29 and 30 August

=== 2022 ===
- Prague: 30 and 31 August
- Brest: 13 and 14 January

=== 2021 ===
- Lisbon (Portugal): 4 March.
- Kranj (Slovenia): 2 and 3 September.

=== 2020 ===
- Lužnica Castle (Croatia): 5 March.
- Berlin: 27 and 28 August

=== 2019 ===
- Bucharest: 31 January–1 February
- Helsinki: 29–30 August

=== 2018 ===
- Sofia: 15–16 February
- Vienna: 30–31 August

=== 2017 ===
- Valletta: 28 April
- Tallinn: 7–8 September

=== 2016 ===
- Amsterdam: 5–6 February
- Bratislava: 2–3 September

=== 2015 ===
- Riga: 6–7 March
- Luxembourg: 4–5 September

=== 2012 ===
- Aphrodite Hills Resort, Pafos: 7 and 8 September

== See also ==
- Foreign Affairs Council
