= Kulbergs cabinet =

Two governments in Latvia were led by Andris Kulbergs during his premiership since 2026:

- First Kulbergs cabinet (May–November 2026)
- Second Kulbergs cabinet (November 2026–present)
