= Education, Youth, Culture and Sport Council =

Council of the European Union

The Education, Youth, Culture and Sport Council (EYCS) is a configuration of the Council of the European Union It meets three or four times a year, twice in its full configuration. This Council brings together the ministers responsible for education, culture, youth, media, communication and sport of the EU member states. Its exact composition depends on the items on the agenda.

The Council configuration on Education, Youth, Culture and Sport was created by merging the former Education and Youth Council and the former Cultural and Audiovisual Council.

The Council usually adopts recommendations in the field of education, culture, youth and sport. However, in some areas such as audiovisual policy or mutual recognition of diplomas, the Council can adopt legislative acts.
