= Foreign Affairs Council =

Configuration of the Council of the European Union

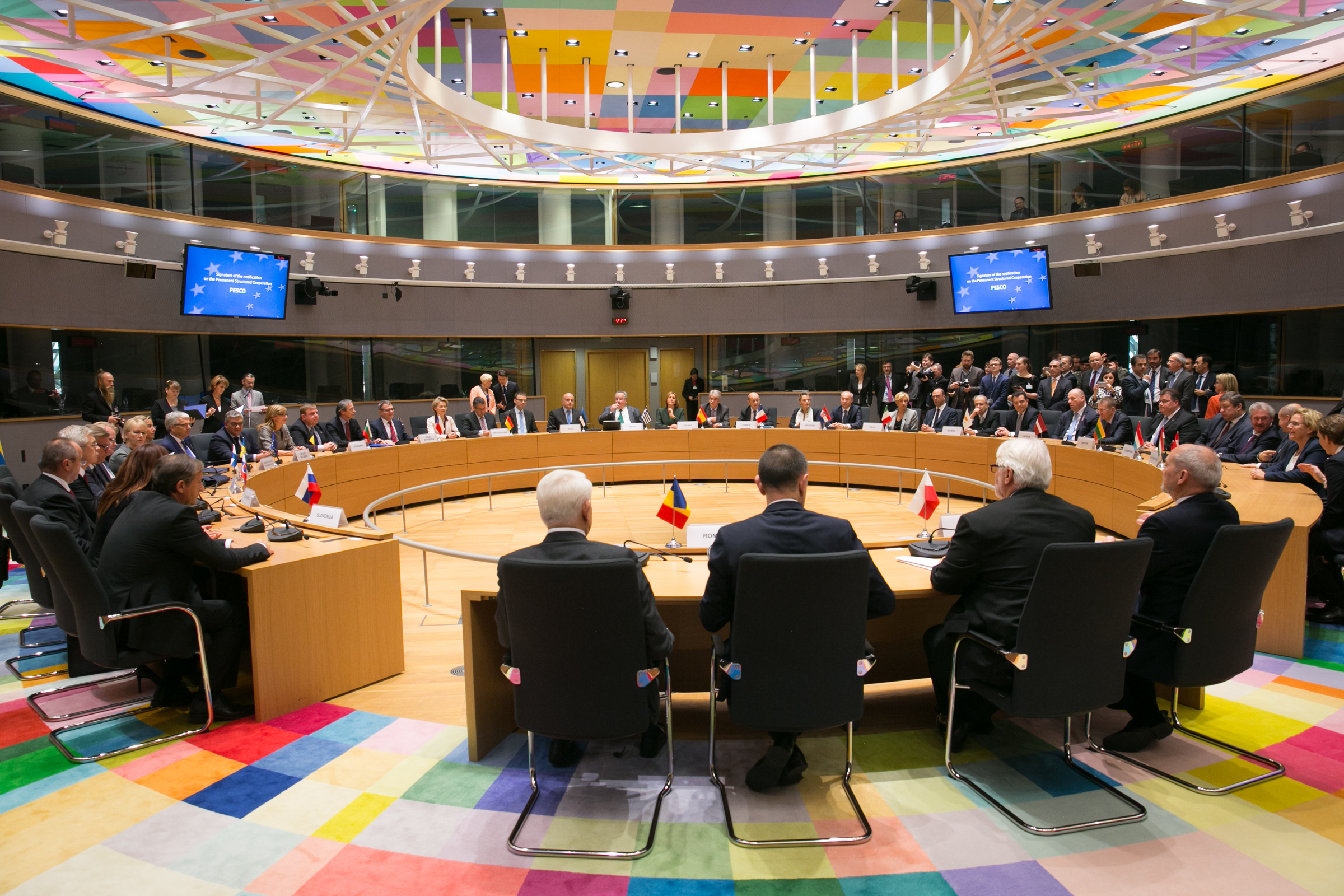
A meeting of the FAC during the signing of the joint notification on the Permanent Structured Cooperation (PESCO) in 2017, featuring both foreign and defence ministers.

The Foreign Affairs Council (FAC) is a configuration of the Council of the European Union that convenes once a month. Meetings bring together the foreign ministers of the member states. Ministers responsible for European affairs, defence, development, or trade also participate depending on the items on the agenda.

At its sessions, the FAC deals with the EU's external action, including Common Foreign and Security Policy (CFSP), Common Security and Defence Policy (CSDP), foreign trade, and development cooperation. In recent years, in cooperation with the European Commission, the FAC has prioritized ensuring coherence in the EU's external action across the range of instruments at the EU's disposal.

The configuration is unique in that it is chaired by the High Representative of the Union for Foreign Affairs and Security Policy (HR/VP) rather than the member state holding the presidency of the Council of the European Union. One exception is when the FAC meets in the configuration of ministers responsible for trade (FAC/Trade), with the presiding member state's minister chairing the meeting. It also has unique powers to adopt CFSP decisions, such as economic sanctions. These acts are neither proposed by the Commission nor co-legislated with Parliament, but are proposed by the High Representative and adopted by the Council by unanimity.

== Composition ==
The Foreign Affairs Council gathers different representatives at ministerial level depending on the agenda of a certain Council meeting. Normally the foreign ministers of each country, or their representatives participate, such as permanent representatives, state secretaries etc. In other cases, defence ministers, trade ministers or development ministers participate.

=== Configurations ===
Configuration	Area	Members	President of the Council	Current President-in-Office
FAC	Common Foreign and Security Policy	foreign affairs ministers	High Representative of the Union	Kaja Kallas (EEAS)
FAC (Defence)	Common Security and Defence Policy	defence ministers	High Representative of the Union	Kaja Kallas (EEAS)
FAC (Development)	Development cooperation	development ministers	High Representative of the Union	Kaja Kallas (EEAS)
FAC (Trade)	Common Commercial Policy	trade ministers	Presiding Member State's responsible minister	Michael Damianos, Minister of Energy, Commerce and Industry (CY)

== History ==
The FAC was created in 2009 by the Treaty of Lisbon by splitting it from the "General Affairs and External Relations Council," with the other part becoming the General Affairs Council. The general and foreign councils are the only two mentioned in the EU treaties.

== Security role ==
The EU command and control (C2) structure is directed by political bodies composed of member states' representatives, and generally requires unanimous decisions. As of April 2019:

Liaison: Advice and recommendations Support and monitoring Preparatory work

Political strategic level:^{[5]}
ISS	EUCO Pres. (EUCO)	Chain of command
Coordination/support
SatCen	CIVCOM	HR/VP (FAC)
INTCEN	HR/VP (PMG)	HR/VP (PSC)^{[6]}	CEUMC (EUMC)
CMPD	DGEUMS^{[3]} (EUMS)
Military/civilian strategic level:
Dir MPCC^{[3]} (MPCC)	JSCC	Civ OpCdr CPCC^{[1]}
Operational level:
MFCdr^{[4]} (MFHQ)	HoM^{[1]}
Tactical level:
CC^{[2]}Air; CC^{[2]} Land; CC^{[2]} Mar; Other CCs^{[2]} European Armed Forces

^{1} In the event of a CSDP Civilian Mission also being in the field, the relations with the Civilian Planning and Conduct Capability (CPCC) and its Civilian Operation Commander (Civ OpCdr), as well as the subordinate Head of Mission (HoM), are coordinated as shown.

^{2} Other Component Commanders (CCs) and service branches which may be established.

^{3} The MPCC is part of the EUMS and Dir MPCC is double-hatted as DGEUMS. Unless the MPCC is used as Operation Headquarters (OHQ), either a national OHQ offered by member states or the NATO Command Structure (NCS) would serve this purpose. In the latter instance, Deputy Supreme Allied Commander Europe (DSACEUR), rather than Dir MPCC, would serve as Operation Commander (OpCdr).

^{4} Unless the MPCC is used as Operation Headquarters (OHQ), the MFCdr would be known as a Force Commander (FCdr), and direct a Force Headquarters (FHQ) rather than a MFHQ. Whereas the MFHQ would act both on the operational and tactical level, the FHQ would act purely on the operational level.

^{5} The political strategic level is not part of the C2 structure per se, but represents the political bodies, with associated support facilities, that determine the missions' general direction. The Council determines the role of the High Representative (HR/VP), who serves as Vice-President of the European Commission, attends European Council meetings, chairs the Foreign Affairs Council (FAC) and may chair the Political and Security Committee (PSC) in times of crisis. The HR/VP proposes and implements CSDP decisions.

^{6} Same composition as Committee of Permanent Representatives (COREPER) II, which also prepares for the CSDP-related work of the FAC.

== See also ==
- Gymnich meeting
