= General Affairs Council =

Configuration of the Council of the European Union

The General Affairs Council is a configuration of the Council of the European Union and meets once a month. Meetings bring together the ministers of Foreign and European affairs of the Member States. Ministers of several other domains can be present as well, it can be cross-ministries as well.

It was created in 2009 by the Treaty of Lisbon by splitting it from the "General Affairs and External Relations Council" with the other part becoming the Foreign Affairs Council. The General and Foreign Councils are the only two Councils mentioned in the EU treaties.

The General Affairs Council deals with dossiers that affect more than one of the EU's policies, such as negotiations on EU enlargement, preparation of the EU's multi-annual budgetary perspective or institutional and administrative issues. It co-ordinates preparation for and follow-up to meetings of the European Council. It also exercises a role in co-ordinating work on different policy areas carried out by the Councils other configurations, and handles any dossier entrusted to it by the European Council.

== Composition ==
=== Configurations ===
Configuration	Area	Members	President of the Council	Current President-in-Office
GAC	coordination of the Council work; preparation of the EUCO meetings; enlargement; multiannual financial framework; other cross-cutting policies	European affairs ministers	Presiding Member State's responsible minister	
GAC (Cohesion)	cohesion policy	cohesion ministers	Presiding Member State's responsible minister	
