= Economic and Financial Affairs Council =

Configuration of the Council of the European Union

The Economic and Financial Affairs Council (ECOFIN) is one of the oldest configurations of the Council of the European Union and is composed of the economics and finance ministers of the 27 European Union member states, as well as Budget Ministers when budgetary issues are discussed.

ECOFIN often works with the European Commissioner for Economic and Financial Affairs and the President of the European Central Bank.

== Tasks ==
The Council covers a number of EU policy areas, such as economic policy coordination, economic surveillance, monitoring of Member States' budgetary policy and public finances, the euro (legal, practical and international aspects), financial markets and capital movements and economic relations with third countries. It also prepares and adopts every year, together with the European Parliament, the budget of the European Union which is about €145 bn.

Art. 284 of the TFEU enables the ECOFIN president can attend the meetings of the ECB's Governing Council as an observer.

== Decision making ==
The council meets once a month and decides mainly by qualified majority, in consultation or codecision with the European Parliament, with the exception of fiscal matters which are decided by unanimity. When the Ecofin Council examines dossiers related to the euro and EMU, the representatives of the Member States whose currency is not the euro do not take part in the vote of the council.

ECOFIN delegates some of its tasks to the Code of Conduct Group. For example, that Group has resolved issues of tax policy on Jersey, Gibraltar and other "dependent or associated territories", and investigated the UK Patent Box tax treatment.

== Members ==
Member	Representing	Political party	Member since
Makis Keravnos	Council Chair (1 January - 30 June 2026) Cyprus	Independent; National: Democratic Party	1 March 2023
Markus Marterbauer	Austria	Party of European Socialists; National: Social Democratic Party	3 March 2025
Vincent Van Peteghem	Belgium	European People's Party; National: Christian Democratic and Flemish	1 October 2020
Georgi Klissurski	Bulgaria	Independent	19 February 2026
Tomislav Ćorić	Croatia	European People's Party; National: Croatian Democratic Union	29 January 2026
Alena Schillerová	Czechia	Patriots.eu; National: ANO 2011	15 December 2025
Stephanie Lose	Denmark	Alliance of Liberals and Democrats for Europe Party; National: Venstre	23 November 2023
Jürgen Ligi	Estonia	Alliance of Liberals and Democrats for Europe Party; National: Estonian Reform Party	23 July 2024
Riikka Purra	Finland	European Conservatives and Reformists Party; National: Finns Party	20 June 2023
Roland Lescure	France	Independent; National: Renaissance	5 October 2025
Lars Klingbeil	Germany	Party of European Socialists; National: Social Democratic Party	6 May 2025
Kyriakos Pierrakakis	Greece	European People's Party; National: New Democracy	15 March 2025f
Márton Nagy	Hungary	Independent	May 24, 2022
Simon Harris	Ireland	European People's Party; National: Fine Gael	18 November 2025
Giancarlo Giorgetti	Italy	Patriots; National: League	22 October 2022
Arvils Ašeradens	Latvia	European People's Party; National: Unity	14 December 2022
Kristupas Vaitiekūnas	Lithuania	Party of European Socialists; National: Social Democratic Party	25 September 2025
Gilles Roth	Luxembourg	European People's Party; National: Christian Social People's Party	17 November 2023
Clyde Caruana	Malta	Party of European Socialists; National: Labour Party	22 November 2020
Eelco Heinen	Netherlands	Alliance of Liberals and Democrats for Europe Party; National: People's Party for Freedom and Democracy	2 July 2024
Andrzej Domański	Poland	European People's Party; National: Civic Coalition	13 December 2023
Joaquim Miranda Sarmento	Portugal	European People's Party; National: Social Democratic Party	2 April 2024
Alexandru Nazare	Romania	European People's Party; National: National Liberal Party	23 June 2025
Ladislav Kamenický	Slovakia	Independent; National: Direction – Social Democracy	25 October 2023
Klemen Boštjančič	Slovenia	Renew Europe; National: Freedom Movement	1 June 2022
Carlos Cuerpo	Spain	Independent	29 December 2023
Elisabeth Svantesson	Sweden	European People's Party; National: Moderate Party	18 October 2022

== See also ==
- Eurogroup (finance ministers only of the eurozone states)
- List of acronyms: European sovereign-debt crisis
