= Transport, Telecommunications and Energy Council =

Configuration of the Council of the European Union

The Transport, Telecommunications and Energy Council (TTE) is a configuration of the Council of the European Union made up of transport, energy and telecommunications ministers. The number of meetings per year and its composition depends on the agenda:

- transport ministers usually meet four times a year
- energy ministers meet three or four times a year
- telecommunications ministers meet twice a year

The aim of this Council configuration is to fulfil EU objectives in the areas of transport, telecommunications and energy, such as establishing modern, competitive and efficient markets and infrastructure, and creating trans-European transport, communications and energy networks. It was created in June 2002 after the merging of three policy areas into one Council configuration.
