= Competitiveness Council (COMPET) =

Configuration of the Council of the European Union

The Competitiveness Council (COMPET) is a configuration of the Council of the European Union that meets at least four times a year. This council brings together ministers responsible for trade, economy, industry, research and innovation and space from all the EU member states. It deals with four policy areas: internal market, industry, research and innovation and space.

This council was created in June 2002 through the merging of three previous configurations (Internal Market, Industry and Research).
