= Employment, Social Policy, Health and Consumer Affairs Council =

Configuration of the Council of the European Union

The Employment, Social Policy, Health and Consumer Affairs Council (EPSCO) is a configuration of the Council of the European Union. It meets four times a year, with two of the meetings focusing on social policy and employment. It is composed of the employment, social affairs, health and consumer policy ministers from all EU member states.

This council works to improve working conditions and employment levels. At the same time it also ensures consumer protection and human health within the EU.
