= Environment Council =

Council of environment ministers

The Environment Council (ENVI) is a configuration of the Council of the European Union. It meets about four times a year. It brings together the environment ministers and is responsible for the EU environment policy.

This Council deals with environmental protection, climate change, prudent use of resources and protection of human health.

In this regard, the Council adopts legislation together with the European Parliament in relation to:

- protection of natural habitats
- clean air and water
- proper waste disposal
- toxic chemicals
- sustainable economy

The council can deal with international issues which go far beyond the borders of the European Union, for example the Open Coalition on Compliance Carbon Markets.
