= 2024 visits by Viktor Orbán to Russia and China =

Visits under the EU presidency without EU mandate

In July 2024, Prime Minister of Hungary Viktor Orbán announced that he would undergo several uncoordinated meetings that he referred to as "peace missions", visiting President of Ukraine Volodymyr Zelenskyy in Kyiv before traveling to Moscow to meet with President of Russia Vladimir Putin, followed by him visiting Beijing to meet with General Secretary of the Chinese Communist Party and President of China Xi Jinping, then traveling to the United States to attend the 2024 Washington summit and to meet President of the United States Donald Trump at Mar-a-Lago. The meetings notably took place amidst heightened tensions and the Russian invasion of Ukraine, with China increasing diplomatic ties to Russia in the midst of economic sanctions by the European Union and the United States.

The visit to Russia was notable in geopolitical history for being conducted without any official approval or mandate from European Union governance despite Vladimir Putin claiming that Orbán was a representative of the European Union. This led to condemnation from several EU national leaders and Ukraine's government, with many dubbing the meetings "appeasement" towards Russia's aggressive, expansionist policies in Ukraine and China's partnership with Russia allowing their military to continue the way despite international sanctions. It also caused concern among European Union leaders that Orbán was attempting to co-opt his position in the presidency of the Council of the European Union and speak on its behalf to achieve personal goals at odds with the policies and values of the bloc.

== Background ==
The sequence of visits came about as Hungary assumed the six-month long rotating presidency of the Council of the European Union on 1 July, where Orbán expressed his intention to leverage the position to undergo a "peace mission" to push for ending the Russo-Ukrainian war. The last visit by an EU leader occurred in April 2022 with Austrian Chancellor Karl Nehammer. The meeting between Orbán and Putin also followed a previous encounter in Beijing in October 2023 discussing possible cooperation on energy. Orbán's government is notable for regularly blocking and delaying the EU's efforts to grant financial and military aid to Ukraine and to impose sanctions on Russia. Orbán was frequently critical of NATO and EU support of Ukraine, previously delaying agreement on a substantial EU aid package intended to provide Ukraine with military assistance in its defense against Russia. He has argued that Russia's superior resources and manpower would make it unbeatable on the battlefield, a position poorly received by Ukrainians and EU governments, due to their fear that a ceasefire would only solidify Russia's hold over its seized territories. The Hungarian government opposed Ukraine's bids to join NATO and the EU, complicating their otherwise unified response to the war.

=== Prior meeting with Ukraine ===
On July 2, Viktor Orbán traveled to Kyiv, Ukraine to meet with President of Ukraine Volodymyr Zelenskyy. In a joint press conference, Orbán proposed a ceasefire to the Russo-Ukrainian War, with a deadline prior to the next Kyiv peace summit, as a means to accelerate peace talks. Ihor Zhovkva, Zelenskyy's foreign policy adviser, stated that Zelenskyy's response reiterated his public stance towards peace, emphasizing Ukraine's peace summit initiative to construct a global coalition to push for peace while maintaining Ukraine's sovereignty. Orbán showed gratitude for Zelenskyy's honest and direct responses. Zelenskyy discussed the potential for a detailed bilateral cooperation agreement between Ukraine and Hungary, which Orbán welcomed. Orbán expressed willingness to have Hungary help modernize Ukraine's economy despite strained diplomatic relations. Zelenskyy stated that he was grateful for Orbán's visit, but emphasized the need for "just peace" before any ceasefire proposal. Zelenskyy called on Orbán to cooperate with its allies to push for Kyiv's requirements for peace.

== Meetings ==
=== Russia ===
The meeting between Orbán and Putin took place in Moscow, Russia on July 5, and lasted for several hours. The meeting was not disclosed to any EU members until immediately before it began. Orbán sought Putin's views on whether a ceasefire could precede peace talks. In response, Putin dismissed the idea of a ceasefire, stating that it would allow Ukraine “to recoup losses, regroup and rearm.” Putin insisted that Ukraine should withdraw its forces from the four oblasts (provinces) Russia claimed annexation of in 2022 (including territory Russia did not occupy), but this withdrawal was rejected by Ukraine. (Note: In a speech on 14 June 2024, Putin outlined Russia's terms for a ceasefire. He said that Russia would not negotiate unless Ukrainian forces fully withdrew from the regions claimed by Russia: all of Donetsk, Luhansk, Kherson and Zaporizhzhia oblasts. On 14 June 2024 Russia was not holding all these territories under its military control. Furthermore, Putin demanded that Ukraine abandoned its plans to join NATO. He claimed that the proposal "is not about freezing the conflict but about its final resolution". Putin listed Ukraine's neutral and non-nuclear status and lifting sanctions against Russia as additional conditions for peace. Putin also mentioned that in future peace negotiations Russia would insist on the "demilitarization and denazification" of Ukraine whose (according to Putin) "parameters were generally agreed upon by everyone back during the Istanbul talks in 2022." Putin also stated in this speech, "Of course, the rights and freedoms of Russian-speaking citizens in Ukraine must be fully ensured". Later on 14 June, Ukrainian President Volodymyr Zelenskyy told Italian news channel Sky TG24: "These messages are ultimatum messages. It's the same thing Hitler did, when he said 'give me a part of Czechoslovakia and it'll end here'.") Putin stated that the pair discussed Russia–European Union relations and how they were “now at their lowest point”. Orbán stated that he asked Putin three questions: his opinions on current peace plans, his thoughts on potential talks for peace and ceasefire proposals, and his thoughts on "post-war European security architecture". Orbán did not give any details on how Putin responded to these questions.

Orban and Putin Press Conference in July 2024

During a press conference following the meeting, Putin referred to Orbán as "a representative of the European Council" rather than just as a representative to Hungary, and described the talks as "frank and useful". He reiterated Moscow's stance that its own peace proposals should be central to any negotiations. Putin also expressed gratitude to Orbán for attempting to restore diplomacy between Russia and Europe, and claimed that Kyiv remained unwilling to cease hostilities.

Prime Minister Orbán acknowledged that "many steps" would be required to end the Russia-Ukraine war, and stressed that while the meeting was the first step toward dialogue, significant differences remained between the positions of Kyiv and Moscow. He further acknowledged the burden the conflict placed on Europe's security and economy, advocating for dialogue and diplomacy as the only solutions. Kremlin spokesman Dmitry Peskov expressed appreciation for Hungary's consistent efforts to resolve the conflict and Orbán's initiative.

=== China ===
On July 8, Viktor Orbán made an unannounced visit to Beijing, China to meet with Chinese leader Xi Jinping, which he called "Peace Mission 3.0" in a public statement. Upon his arrival, he was welcomed by Chinese Foreign Vice Minister Hua Chunying and several Chinese officials. Orbán posted a picture of him and Xi shaking hands, captioning it with a statement on how China along with the United States and the EU were critical to stopping the Russo-Ukrainian war.

Orbán commended China's attempts to initiate peace to stabilize the increasing conflict in the world. Xi Jinping urged world powers to help reinitiate direct negotiations and diplomacy between Ukraine and Russia.

Following meetings

On July 9 and 11 Orban attended the 2024 Washington summit for NATO.

On July 11 Orban met former president and 2024 Republican presidential candidate Donald Trump at Mar-a-Lago during which various topics where discussed including the Russian war in Ukraine.

== Aftermath ==
=== Reporting to the EU ===
After each of the meetings, press conferences were organized, as is standard. Soon after the visits, Orbán sent an official letter to the president of the European Council, Charles Michel, about the matters discussed at the meetings. He also expressed his personal opinion, saying: "The chance for peace is diminished by the fact that diplomatic channels are blocked and there is no direct dialogue between the parties who have a leading role to play in creating the conditions for peace".

== Reactions ==
Orbán's visit to Moscow was met with condemnation from many key figures of the European Union and NATO, who often cited Vladimir Putin representing Orbán as "a representative of the European Council" as a point of frustration.

=== Initial reconciliations with NATO ===
Soon after the visit, Orbán made it clear to the Secretary General of NATO, Jens Stoltenberg, that the trip was not on behalf of NATO. Amidst intense criticism of the visit by other NATO countries, Stoltenberg added that "Different NATO allies interact with Moscow in different ways".

=== Ukraine ===
On 5 July 2024, the Foreign Ministry of Ukraine strongly condemned Orbán's visit to Moscow, for not coordinating the visit with Ukraine beforehand, reaffirming their viewpoint that any agreements concerning Ukrainian affairs must involve Ukraine. On 8 July 2024 Ukrainian President Volodymyr Zelenskyy stated that Hungary could not be a mediator between Russia and Ukraine on its own, since he believed that Hungary did not have an "economy that influences Russia", or "a very powerful army that Putin fears, which is stronger than the Russian one."

=== European Union ===
European Union Foreign Affairs Chief Josep Borrell clarified that Orbán had no official EU mandate, and emphasized to the international community the visit only regarded Hungary-Russia relations and that Orbán was "not representing the EU in any capacity". Borrell also criticised the visit as it came soon after Putin's International Criminal Court indictment and arrest warrant for enforcing policies of deporting Ukrainian children to Russia. European Commission representative Eric Mamer criticised the visit as appeasement, rather than a genuine pursuit of peace. President of the European Commission Ursula von der Leyen reinforced the EU's stance against appeasement, emphasizing that unity and determination within EU nations were the primary way lasting and just peace would come to Ukraine. President of the European Council Charles Michel reiterated that Hungary was not approved by the EU to meet with Russia on its behalf, especially while holding presidency of the council of the EU. He stressed that any discussions about Ukraine must include Ukraine itself, underscoring the EU's clear stance that Russia is the aggressor and that Ukraine is the victim in the war.

Estonian Prime Minister Kaja Kallas, accused Orbán of exploiting Hungary's EU presidency "to sow confusion" while reiterating the EU's unity behind Ukraine against Russia. Prime Minister of Sweden Ulf Kristersson lambasted the visit as "an insult to the Ukrainian people’s fight for their freedom."

White House Press Secretary Karine Jean-Pierre stated that the meeting would not help bring peace and was ultimately “counterproductive to promoting Ukraine’s sovereignty, territorial integrity, and independence”.

German Foreign Minister Annalena Baerbock announced that she wanted bring up the Moscow meeting to Hungarian Minister of Foreign Affairs Péter Szijjártó in a "serious and honest personal discussion" in Budapest.

==== Actions against Hungary ====
On 15 July 2024, the European Commission announced that several top European Union officials, including European Commission president Ursula von der Leyen, would boycott informal meetings held by Hungary as a result of the visits at the "start of the Hungarian (EU) presidency". János Bóka, Hungarian European affairs minister, denounced the decision in a public statement stating that the commission could not "cherry pick institutions and member states it wants to cooperate with" and rhetorically asked if all decisions made by the European Commission were primarily based on "political concerns". Hungarian government spokesperson and commissioner of the Hungarian EU council presidency Zoltán Kovács also released a public statement calling the decision as purely motivated by private politics and ideologically motivated regardless of the body's institutional framework. Sweden and Finland also announced boycotts of its top officials from Hungary-hosted EU Council meetings, intending to send civil servants in their place.

On 23 July 2024, the European Union took away Hungary's right to host an upcoming set of foreign and defense ministry meetings, moving the meetings from Budapest to Brussels. Chief of Foreign Affairs Josep Borrell announced the measure as a reprimand against Orbán's uncoordinated meetings, stating that "We have to send a signal, even if it is a symbolic signal". He noted that while most EU nation states condemned Orbán's meetings, many were unsure of whether they should take part in the Hungary-hosted meetings or not. Orbán condemned the response to his visits as "childish". Hungarian Minister of Foreign Affairs Péter Szijjártó referred to the decision as a "kindergarten-level debate" and called the measures taken against the Hungarian rotating presidency by the EU a "concerted, hysterical, often mocking series of attacks".

=== Hungary ===
Orbán responded to the criticism by stating that Hungary was “slowly becoming the only country in Europe that can speak to everyone” and the only country that was able to directly talk with the two states in conflict. He further stated on his X account that Josep Borrell's response to the meeting amounted to "Brusselian bureaucratic nonsense". Orbán stated in an interview with Swiss news outlet Die Weltwoche that he was considering the possibility of setting up more uncoordinated meetings in the future to advance diplomacy in manners that don't necessarily align with EU strategies. On 8 July 2024 in an interview with German tabloid newspaper BILD Orban repeated his calls for a cease-fire and warned of further escalation in the war in coming months claiming "Believe me: the next two or three months will be much more brutal than we think. There are more weapons [involved] and the Russians are more determined. The energy in the confrontation, the number of dead, the number of victims will become more brutal than in the last seven months." Orbán stated that he was "not arguing about who is right and who is wrong" and claimed his "aim is peace and a cease-fire."

Hungarian Minister of Foreign Affairs Péter Szijjártó released a video statement following Orbán's 5th July Moscow visit, stating that "The peace mission continues and even intensifies", while telling "European pro-war politicians" to "fasten their seatbelts".

Hungary abruptly cancelled a visit between German Foreign Minister Annalena Baerbock and Szijjártó on 6 July, two days before the planned meeting. Baerbock called the cancellation a "surprise" that she regretted, and stated that Germany would reschedule the trip.

== See also ==
- 2024 Hungarian Presidency of the Council of the European Union
- Hungary and the Russian invasion of Ukraine
- Peace negotiations in the Russian invasion of Ukraine
- 2025 Budapest Summit
- Hungary–Ukraine relations
- Hungary–Russia relations
- China–Hungary relations
