= Hungary and the Russo-Ukrainian war =

Response of Hungary to the 2022 Russian invasion of Ukraine

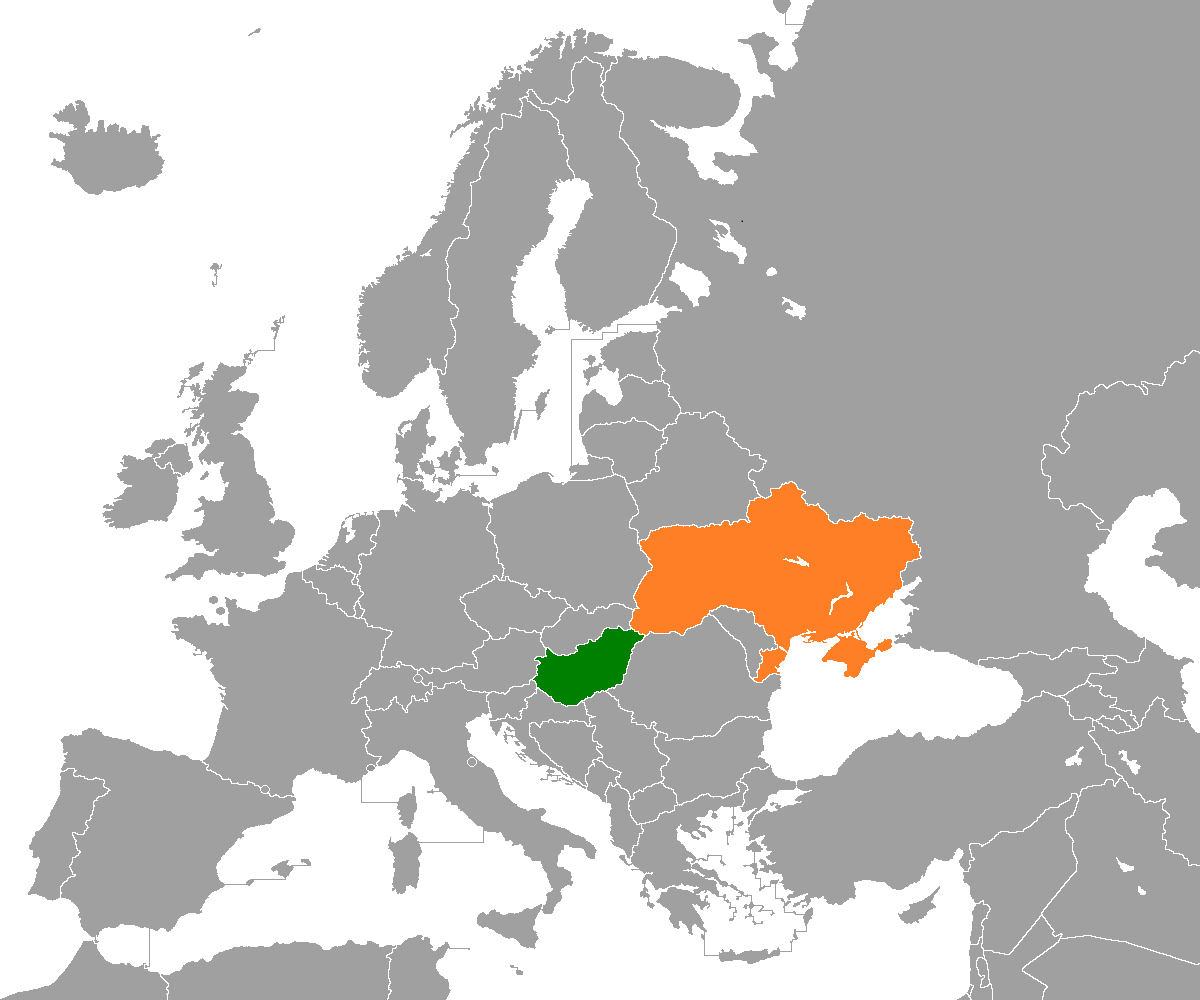
Locations of Hungary and Ukraine

Hungary's reactions to the Russian invasion of Ukraine have been incongruous with the attitudes of NATO and European Union member states since the beginning of the war. Hungary, a member of the European Union and NATO, was one of the few European states that did not provide military aid. However Hungary provides 40% of Ukraine's electricity import, which is by far the largest among the other exporting states. The Hungarian government received widespread criticism for its attitude to the war, both at home and abroad: Hungarian Prime Minister Viktor Orbán condemned the war, but in many of his statements he tried to blame the target of the invasion Ukraine, the Western countries and their organizations, and his political opposition instead of Russia for the prolongation of the war and its economic consequences.

The Hungarian government behaved in a contradictory manner during the invasion, and often expressed different views on certain proposals at home compared to its decisions in the EU and in the UN while abroad.

== UN votes ==
On February 28, 2022, the General Assembly of the United Nations opened its 11th emergency special session, which dealt with the topic of the Russian invasion of Ukraine. The General Assembly adopted six resolutions to be enacted until February 2023, with Hungary voting on all of them.

Decision	Date	Contents	Hungary's vote
ES-11/1	02.03.2022	Deplores Russia's invasion of Ukraine and demanded a full withdrawal of Russian forces and a reversal of its decision to recognise the self-declared People's Republics of Donetsk and Luhansk.	In favour
ES-11/2	24.03.2022	Reaffirms the UN's former commitments and obligations under its Charter, and reiterated its demand that Russia withdraw from Ukraine's recognized sovereign territory; it also expressed grave concern over and condemned attacks on civilian populations and infrastructure.	In favour
ES-11/3	04.07.2022	Suspends Russia's membership in the UN Human Rights Council due to the state's serious and systematic human rights violations.	In favour
ES-11/4	12.10.2022	Declares the Russian referendums in the Zaporizhia, Kherson, Donetsk, and Luhansk regions invalid and illegal, calling on all countries not to recognize the Russian annexation of the territories.	In favour
ES-11/5	14.11.2022	Calls on Russia to pay war reparations to Ukraine.	In favour
ES-11/6	23.02.2023	Calls for the establishment of a just and lasting peace in Ukraine along the lines of the United Nations Charter, with full respect for Ukraine's territorial integrity.	In favour

== Aid, handling the refugee situation ==
=== Aid packages ===
The government of Hungary is one of the countries in the European Union that does not supply self-defense military equipment to Ukraine, nor does it allow military equipment sent by other member states to pass through the country. The opposition repeatedly criticized the government for this "swing policy".

On February 27, Foreign Minister Péter Szijjártó announced at a joint press conference with the governor of Transcarpathia, Viktor Mikita, that Hungary would help Ukraine with nearly 30,000 tons of food and fuel in order to alleviate the humanitarian disaster. On March 2, Viktor Orbán announced one of the largest humanitarian actions in the country's history, through which the nation would initially send HUF 600 million worth of food, hygiene equipment, and childcare products to Ukraine as humanitarian aid. The Bridge to Subcarpathian program created by the government and announced on February 26 came into operation on March 5. Callers to the national helpline number 1357 were able to support the coalition for the Subcarpathian Bridge with HUF 500 per call. The Hungarian Catholic Charity, the Hungarian Maltese Charity, the Hungarian Ecumenical Charity, the Hungarian Reformed Charity, the Baptist Charity Foundation, and the Hungarian Red Cross also participated in the program.

On December 6, at Ecofin, the EU finance ministers' council, only Hungary did not vote in favor of the decision on to transfer an aid fund to Ukraine. Hungary was the only nation to veto the decision since the outbreak of the war. According to expert on Russian topics András Rácz, the refusal to vote in favor was a serious mistake both diplomatically and professionally. The Hungarian government attempted to deny these actions in the domestic media, with the Ministry of Finance stating that: "Contrary to the erroneous news published in the press today, the 18 billion euro support of Ukraine was not on the agenda at the Ecofin meeting held on 12.06.2022. All such claims are false.” Later, both Orbán and Péter Szijjártó denied the news about this. At the same time, the move was clearly evaluated as a veto in the press of foreign nations. While analysts generally stated that the proposed decision was less about the granting of the aid itself and more about the establishment of its financial conditions, the Hungarian veto prevented this as well.

=== Ukrainian refugees in Hungary ===
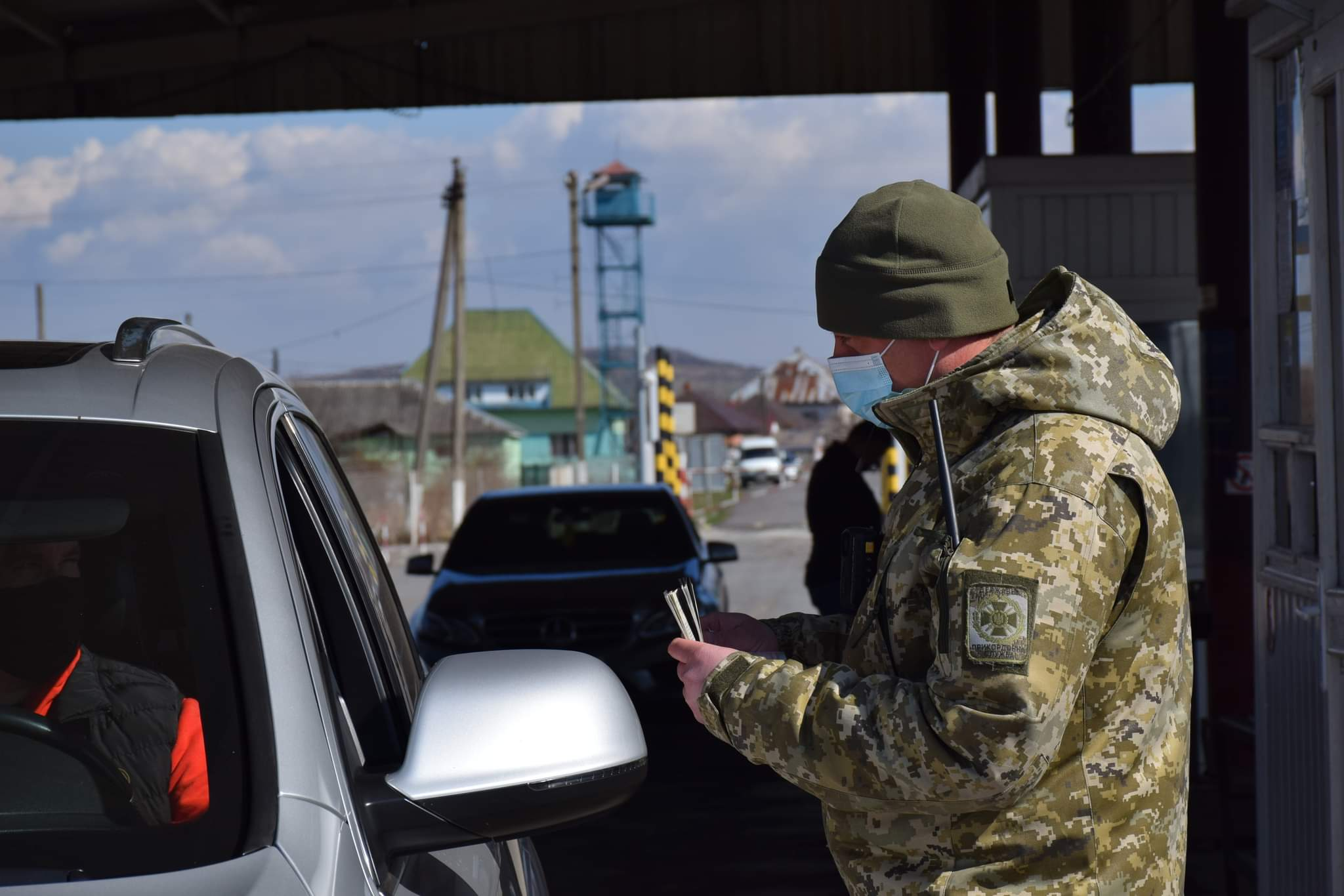
Ukrainian civilians waiting at a border checkpoint in Hungary

Several NGOs and private individuals provided assistance to Ukrainian refugees arriving in Hungary, especially at the border and at the capital's train stations. In the meantime, the government made several images and videos about helping the refugees with Orbán as one of the central figures involved. Both Ukrainian refugees and the border settlements they arrived at, reported that they did not receive significant state help with coordinating their work. Many villages had to organize many aspects of the refugee intake themselves and were forced to solve the needs of families, the elderly, small children or pregnant women on their own. The Hungarian government promised help to the refugees staying in Hungary, even though less than one percent of surveyed refugees stated they wanted to stay in Hungary. When asked, the government did not specify how they planned to help. The question of testing refugees for COVID-19 also arose, to which the Hungarian government only announced operational measures later. On March 13, Péter Szijjártó made several announcements regarding the support for refugees who arrived in Hungary: he explained that employers who employ refugees from Ukraine and who take care of their long-term placement, accommodation, and transit to their workplace would receive financial support: HUF 60,000 per employed refugee per month, and an additional HUF 12,000 for their children. Among the additional measures announced by the government, the border crossing was made open for 24 hours per day to move through the most refugees as soon as possible, the creation of help points in the settlements along the border, and the provision of 24-hour medical care and COVID-19 screening in several settlements.

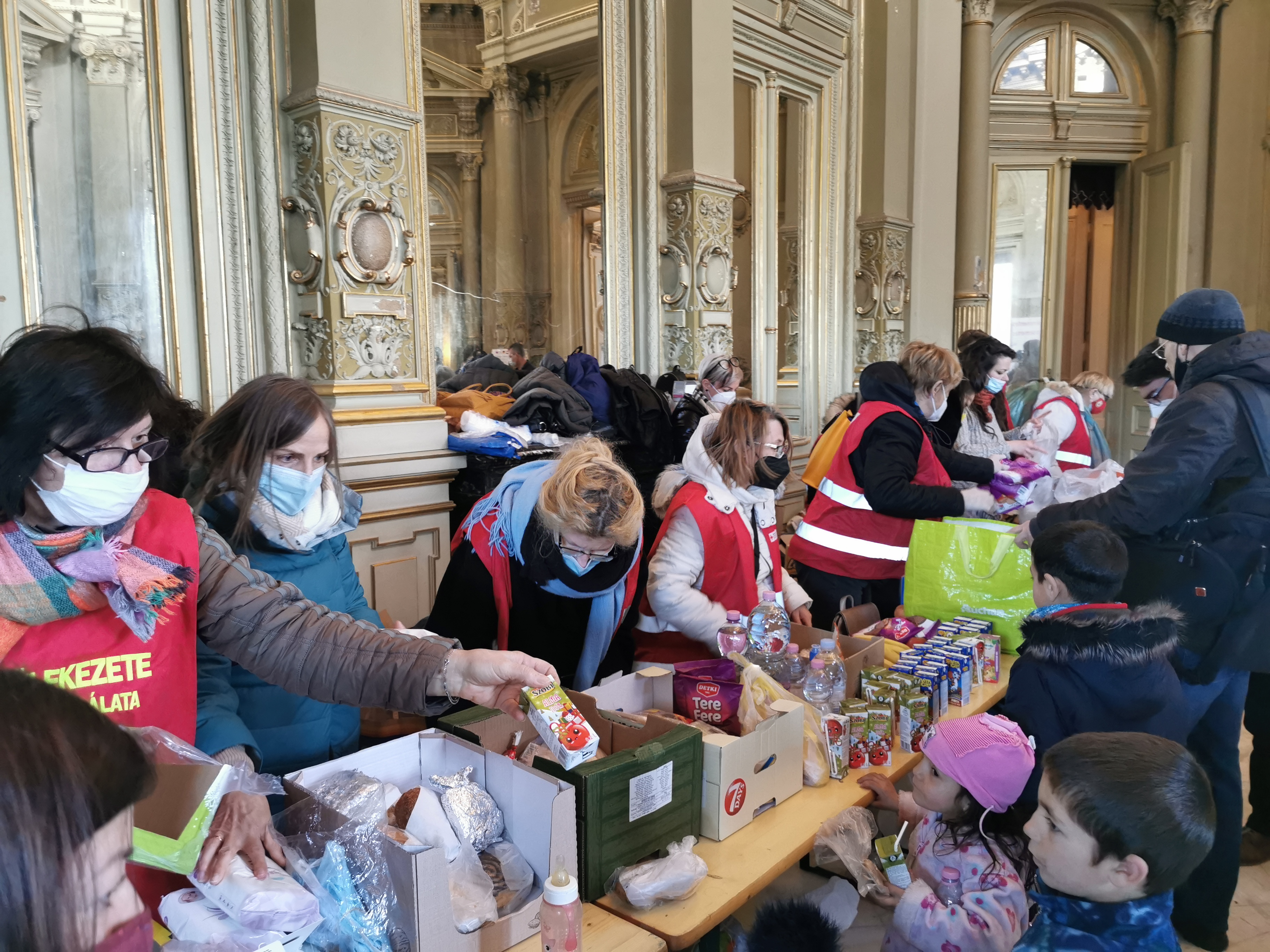
Civilians help Ukrainian refugees at one of the aid points in Hungary.

The Disaster Management Agency organized accommodation for displaced people who needed it. Furthermore, Hungary has assured that if someone requested refugee status, applications could be submitted at collection points and customer services in Hungarian cities. Hungarian State Railways began running special trains for displaced people, and provided free tickets to those in need. Volánbusz also launched several special bus systems to transport refugees. Hungary provided HUF 1.3 billion in support to large aid organizations. The government created the humanitarian council, with the aim of coordinating the work of aid organizations, collecting donations and delivering them to those affected, and a special working group to help refugees who wanted to find employment. However, at the Budapest Nyugati railway station, the support promised by the government was barely perceptible, and the aid of the refugees was still mainly carried out by civilians. On March 21, the government finally abolished the civilian-initiated care facilities at the train stations and directed all newly arriving refugees to the SYMA Sports and Conference Centre, where they continued to receive similar care. The refugees were brought to the facility by buses from the Kőbánya upper railway station. According to State Secretary István György, the government decided only three weeks after the outbreak of the war to establish the transit waiting room at the sports hall because the expected increase in the number of refugees required a higher capacity facility. He thanked the civilians for their work up to that point. According to György, the government did performed their promised tasks at the railway stations prior to the relocation and referred to organizations that help their work as partners, despite civilians stating that they did almost everything for most of the period.

=== Prisoners of war in Hungary ===
According to an announcement by the Russian Orthodox Church on June 8, 2023, some Transcarpathian soldiers fighting for Ukraine and captured by Russia were sent to Hungary, although the Ukrainian side claimed that they were not informed about this. Deputy Prime Minister Zsolt Semjén later stated that the transfer was a positive gesture of the Russian Orthodox Church towards Hungary, and that the soldiers owed their freedom to it, and that it was "his human and patriotic duty." It was questionable to outside observers whether the prisoners of war were legally staying in Hungary. Because of the incident, Ukraine contacted the Hungarian foreign affairs office after not knowing about the handover, and called the Hungarian embassy's charge d'affaires. According to a Ukrainian statement, after the failure to notify Ukraine, suspicion arose in Ukraine that Russia intended to use the nebulous release of the prisoners for anti-Ukrainian propaganda with Hungarian cooperation. Russian Defense Minister Sergei Shoigu denied that Russia had handed over prisoners of war to Hungary. According to later reports, Semjén managed this extradition on the Hungarian side alone without notifying the Hungarian government, which led to internal conflicts.

According to Ukrainska Pravda on June 16, Oleh Kotenko, the Ukrainian commissioner responsible for missing persons, obtained information about the prisoners of war. At the same time, even days later, Ukraine voiced its displeasure that it still could not contact the prisoners of war and that the Hungarian foreign ministry did not respond to its request. As a result, Ukrainian officials accused Hungary of lying about the incident. In the meantime, the government announced that the eleven soldiers were no longer prisoners of war by law, and that they could go wherever they want. After the incident, the European Commission also started an inquiry into the situation and called on Hungary to clarify details. The case was further complicated when the Ukrainian military intelligence spokesman Andriy Yusov stated that Hungary applied to the Russians for the prisoners of war, who were selected on the basis of a list, but the surrendered prisoners could not move freely in Hungary either and were kept in isolation, where they could not be taken contact with Ukraine. According to Yusov, Ukraine knew about the planned action, but the Hungarian side denied that it was preparing for such an act when asked about it. Three soldiers were released, which were confirmed by pictures of the released soldiers. Minister of Foreign Affairs and Trade Péter Szijjártó commented on the case: "I would like to make it clear again that there was contact between the Russian Orthodox Church and the Hungarian Maltese Charity Service, as a result of which eleven former prisoners of war arrived in Hungary. We didn't oppose this, of course, why would we oppose it?" Szijjártó also denied that the government had participated in the extradition (although it was apparently aware of it) and that the former prisoners of war could not have moved freely. According to Gergely Gulyás, the minister in charge of the Prime Minister's Office, they had no obligation to notify Ukraine, because the soldiers did not come to Hungary as prisoners of war, but as free people.

== Reactions of the Hungarian government ==
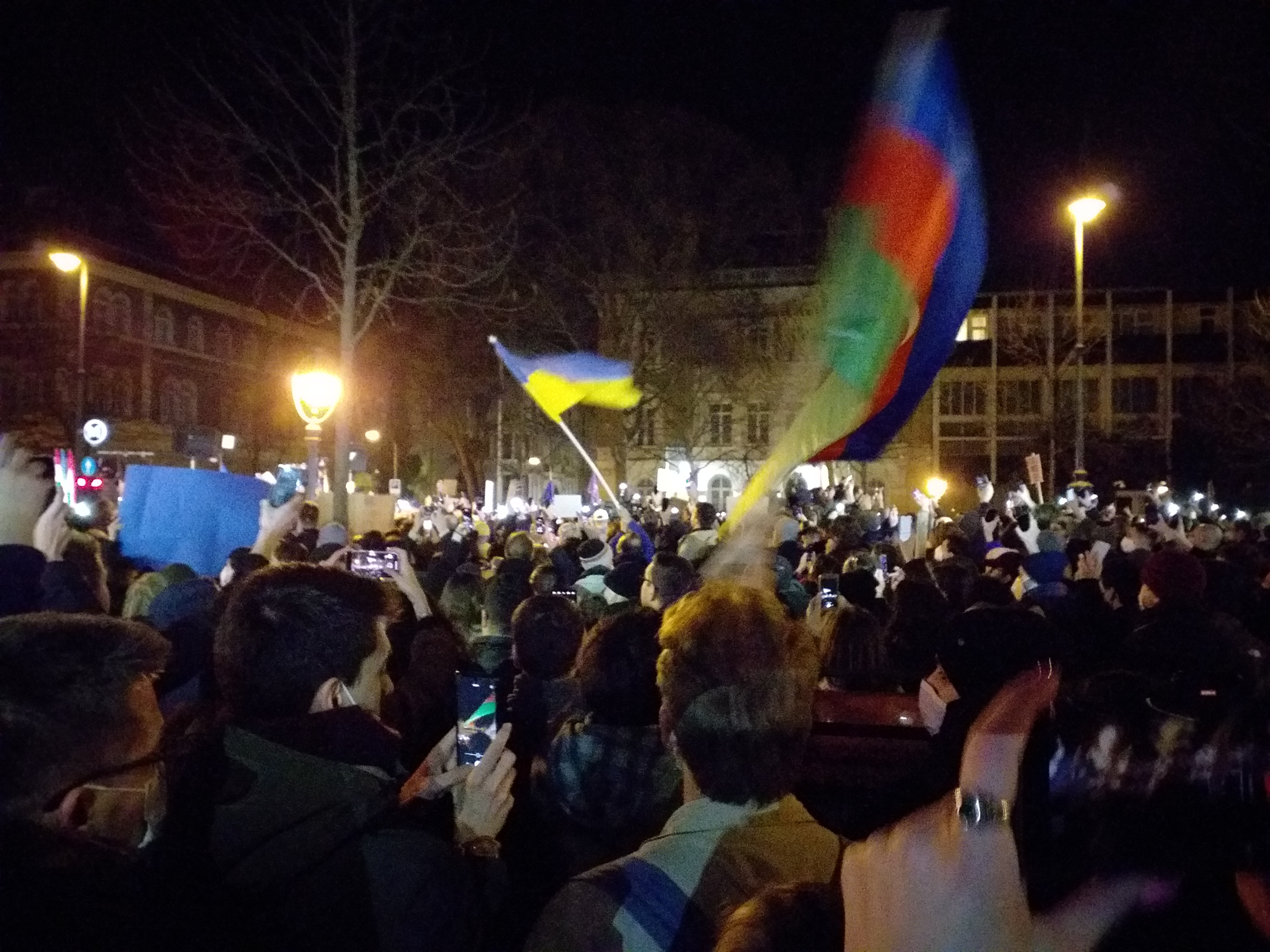
Hungarians demonstrate in Budapest at the onset of the Russian invasion of Ukraine.

The Orbán government has repeatedly stated that since the beginning of the operation, there were two political leaderships in Europe that consistently called for peace: the Vatican and Hungary. Prime Minister Viktor Orbán emphasized staying out of the war from the beginning, while agreeing with NATO allies and condemning the war. According to a Hungarian poll conducted at the end of June 2022, the most pro-peace European leaders were Viktor Orbán and Pope Francis. At the same time, "peace" was only spoken in general terms by the Orbán government without specific ideas or conditions for peace terms. Orbán later said that the government also supported China's peace plan.

On March 21, Viktor Orbán spoke about NATO proposals, saying: "there are dangerous proposals on NATO's table," in reference to member states suggesting an airspace blockade over Ukraine. Orbán stated that "NATO is a defensive alliance" and that: "we are able and capable, and even obliged, to protect each other, but it is not NATO's business to engage in military actions outside NATO territory," and: "Hungary's position is clear, we do not want to send soldiers or weapons beyond NATO territory," he declared. Despite the Hungarian government's anti-war rhetoric, it continues to invest in the Hungarian defense industry through the Zrínyi National Defense and Armed Forces Development Program.

In the meantime, pro-government publicists published several comments criticizing Ukraine and its Western allies in solidarity, such as Zsolt Bayer and András Kovács, journalists for the Hungarian news portal Origo. Other pro-government publicists also published articles and opinions critical of the EU and Ukraine.

Viktor Orbán and Fidesz portrayed the 2022 Hungarian parliamentary election as a choice between peace or war, with Fidesz for peace and the opposition for war. Fidesz would win re-election with 54.13% of the popular vote, the highest vote share by any party since the Fall of Communism in 1989.

On May 15, Speaker of the House László Kövér interpreted the conflict on Hír TV while on Zsolt Bayer's program. He stated that the conflict was actually being fought between the United States and China, and explained the context from a Eurosceptic perspective referring to the EU as a weak alliance maintained by the interest and influence of the United States. Later, he described Volodymyr Zelenskyy as having "a mental problem" because, according to him, the Ukrainian president "makes demands and threatens". The Ukrainian presidential office sharply criticized Kövér's words.

On June 21, 2022, Zelenskyy called Viktor Orbán by phone to discuss Ukraine's integration into the EU, the intake of war refugees and other areas of Hungarian-Ukrainian cooperation. The Hungarian Prime Minister indicated that he is open to helping the country and supporting its status as a candidate for EU membership.

On July 7, 2022, it was revealed that Romulusz Ruszin-Szendi, commander of the Hungarian Defense Forces, visited Ukraine with a delegation. The Hungarian public found out about the visit from the Facebook page of the Ukrainian army's general staff, according to which the Hungarian commander also met Valerii Zaluzhnyi, the Commander-in-Chief of the Ukrainian army. Their meeting was said to be about building professional and friendly relationship, as well as on moving forward with military cooperation. The Hungarian delegation also made a larger tour of Ukraine. The meeting was notable because the Orbán government had previously discussed the war in such a way that "Hungary should stay out of it". In July 2022, Viktor Orbán made statements regarding sanctions applied by the European Union member states against Russia: "the sanctions policy not only did not fulfill the hopes attached to it, but also had the opposite effect as planned. They thought that the sanctions policy would hurt the Russians more than the Europeans, it didn't happen like that, it hurts us more. They thought that the war could be shortened with the help of the sanctions policy, because success could be achieved quickly by weakening Russia. That didn't work either."

In his speech in Băile Tușnad, Romania, on July 23, 2022, Orbán also addressed the war and criticized the European Union, NATO and their measures towards the conflict. Among other things he stated:

- "We Hungarians are the only ones who will die in that war, apart from the Ukrainians", which he justified by the alleged death of 86 Transcarpathian Hungarians;
- "If Donald Trump were now the American president and Angela Merkel the German chancellor, then the Russian-Ukrainian war would have never broken out";
- "The Russians formulated a very clear security demand, which they sent to NATO and the USA. They demand that Ukraine never become a member of NATO and that we undertake to never place weapons on the territory of Ukraine that reach the territory of Russia." NATO has refused this and does not want to discuss it either, which is why, according to him, Russia is trying to assert itself with weapons. He later stated: "The Russians are a military people who think only of security", according to him, the weapons sent to Ukraine will be acquired by the Russians, which means prolonging the war;
- According to him, Ukraine wants to involve as many Western countries as possible in the war, while Russia does not aim to attack NATO;
- According to him, the European Union should stand between Ukraine and Russia instead of punishing Russia with sanctions, which he thinks the EU is doing a poor job of compared to Russia and the USA due to their self-sufficiency with energy.

In a radio interview on November 18, Orbán stated untruthfully that "Hungary never supported the sanctions and never voted for them, whenever possible, it fought for exemption".

A Hungarian public dignitary eventually paid his respects at Ukraine in November 2022, being the last of the European Union states to do so since the outbreak of the war. On November 26, the President of the Republic of Hungary Katalin Novák visited Kyiv, arriving at the invitation of Ukrainian President Voldomyr Zelenskyy, together with the Lithuanian Prime Minister Ingrida Šimonytė and the Polish Prime Minister Mateusz Morawiecki. Novak also condemned Russia's aggression. Novák's visit caused considerable criticism, presumably among pro-government voters following the government's criticism of Ukraine. According to critical opinions, Novák's belated visit was merely a mockery on the part of the Orbán government based on its pro-Russian gestures.

In a radio interview on December 2, Orbán repeated his previous claims: according to him, sanctions against Russia do not work, the EU does not support Hungary instead of supporting the left, and that the West does not strive for peace. He stated that he did not support taking out a joint European Union loan to support Ukraine, but instead that everyone should manage Ukrainian support from their own budgets, which he claimed the Hungarian government had done and would proceed with again in 2023.

=== 2023 ===
On January 14, 2023, government spokesperson Alexandra Szentkirályi presented the results of the national consultation survey initiated due to war sanctions - which, like previous consultations, lacked transparency. According to the statement, "almost 1.4 million people filled in and returned the consultation sheets, 97 percent of whom reject EU sanctions against Russia." The technical costs of the consultation survey amounted to nearly HUF 2.7 billion. The European Commission responded by saying that the 27 member states unanimously decided on the sanctions, so the Hungarian government would need to convince the other 26 member states to follow its opinion.

On the evening of January 26, 2023, Viktor Orbán met with a group of 15 foreign journalists participating in the media conference of the Mathias Corvinus Collegium in the Carmelite Monastery of Buda. According to a summary by editor-in-chief of American Conservative and conversation participant Rod Dreher, Orbán was of the opinion that "the West must understand that Putin cannot afford to lose and will not lose, because there will be another election next year, and he cannot run like a president who has lost a war.” According to him, due to the protracted war, Russia can no longer put a pro-Russian puppet government at the head of Ukraine, so it wants to turn Ukraine into a "wrecked no-man's land" and to prevent the presence of NATO in the region. According to him, the West is not on the winning side because it also became part of the war due to its delivery of weapons to Ukraine. He referred to Russia as "a huge country and can mobilize a huge army, but Ukraine is not able to do this", so he did not rule out the deployment of NATO troops or Russian nuclear weapons. During the conversation, he also mentioned that he does not want Hungary to be in the European Union, but he has no other choice, because 85 percent of his exports are directed to the European Union. The latter statement was subsequently updated in the article with the text "personally, it is painful for him that Hungary is in the European Union and is at the mercy of harassment, but there is no question that Hungary will remain in the European Union, because economic prosperity depends on it", from which further Euroskeptic sentences were added. A day later, the Ukrainian Foreign Ministry announced that it would request Hungary's ambassador to Kyiv to protest Orbán's "totally unacceptable" statements about Ukraine.

On February 9, 2023, Ukrainian president Volodymyr Zelenskyy met Viktor Orbán for the first time since the outbreak of the war at a European Council summit. The Ukrainian president was greeted with a standing ovation and a warm welcome from the EU leaders, but Orbán did not appear to show any outward sympathy for Zelenskyy. In the leaders' group photo, he was placed directly behind the Ukrainian president. Later, however, he also shook hands and discussed with him several times. However, one of several pictures of the handshake was published on his social media page, which was interpreted by journalists as giving an unfavorable impression to Zelenskyy. Orbán commented on the events on Twitter in English, saying that Hungary continues to provide humanitarian and financial support to Ukraine and calls for an immediate ceasefire, then added that "Hungary belongs to the peace camp". During the meeting with Zelenskyy, the Ukrainian president invited Orbán to Kyiv, to which Orbán's press chief responded: "When it is necessary and timely, the prime minister will visit Kyiv." Finally, Gergely Gulyás announced in March that the Ukrainian language law negatively affecting Transcarpathian Hungarians represented an obstacle for Orbán's willingness to travel to Kyiv, and that it could only take place after it is amended.

On February 16, 2023, Fidesz representatives in the European Parliament unanimously did not vote in favor of parliament resolutions condemning the inhumane conditions of detention of Alexei Navalny, Putin's political opponent, which the parliament accepted with a large majority.

Orbán also spoke about the war and his government's attitude to it at his annual review held on February 18, 2023. In his speech, he clearly stated: "We will maintain economic relations with Russia, and we recommend this to our allies as well." He reiterated that Hungary must stay out of the war, which, according to him, is not easy as a NATO and EU member, because "everyone there is on the side of the war except us." He also said that Russia does not pose a threat to Hungary, because it is clear that the Russian military is not in a position to attack NATO; that all countries strategically want the same thing: to have a sovereign Ukraine, and for Russia not to pose a threat to the other countries, and that NATO membership is not a war coalition, and it is not for the member states to jointly attack a third country, and that the "Brussels people have not yet given their lives in this war, but Hungarians have already", therefore "more respect for the Hungarians in Munkács, Kyiv, Brussels and Washington". He further stated that Europe is on the brink of war, because by helping Ukraine with weapons it is already in an indirect war with Russia, and that "there will be peace when the Americans and Russians negotiate with each other, the later we pay, the higher the price."

Orbán and Péter Szijjártó later stated that Europe was in "war psychosis". Szijjártó rebutted the charge of Russian friendship by saying that the relationship maintained with the Russians ensures the country's energy supply and, in his opinion, also reduced the escalation of the war. Orbán declared that "we are losing Hungarians by the hundreds in the war", which he also said in foreign interviews, even though there were only twelve confirmed deaths until February 2023, and that there was no official record of the statistic.

From March 2023, the World War narrative also came to the forefront of government communication, when Orbán spoke about it in an interview with a Swiss newspaper published on March 2 that "a nuclear power with a population of 140 million is against the Ukrainians, and the entire NATO is against the Russians. That's what makes it so dangerous. There is a stalemate that could easily turn into a world war." However, according to Orbán, the West was unable to recognize these risks. He later made references to this on other occasions, which were also picked up by media close to the government.

At the same time, the eight-point government proposal adopted on the one-year anniversary of the war stated that "the Parliament condemns Russia's military aggression and recognizes that Ukraine has the right to self-defense." In addition, it “expresses our commitment to peace. We expect all members of the international community to act for the sake of peace as soon as possible and to avoid those steps that involve the expansion of the war." In addition, they condemned the EU sanctions despite Orbán voting in favor of them earlier. According to the decision, the sanctions did not quell the war, nor did they bring the Russian economy to its knees.

Among the ministers of justice of the member states of the European Union, only the Hungarian Judit Varga did not sign the document in which they supported the arrest warrant issued by the International Criminal Court on March 17, 2023, against Vladimir Putin and his children's rights commissioner. Reflecting on the case, the Hungarian foreign affairs spokesman said: "It is a lie that the government vetoed the European Union declaration in the International Criminal Court case." According to him, "the truth is that the government communicated its position to Josep Borrell, High Representative for Foreign Affairs and Security Policy, that it takes note of the decision of the International Criminal Court and does not wish to comment on it in any way, but if the High Representative or any member state wants to issue a statement, Hungary will not object against it." On March 31, 2023, the National Assembly adopted a pro-peace declaration, in which they condemned Russia's aggression, took a stand for peace, and criticized what they described as "Brussels sanctions" and "pro-war policies".

In a radio interview on March 31, Orbán continued to discuss a possible world war outcome, which he believed could only be avoided with an immediate ceasefire. He then accused the European Union of being "pro-war". He also touched on the possibility that EU countries could send peacekeepers to Ukraine, which caused displeasure in Russia.

Péter Szijjártó gave an interview to the BBC on April 18, 2023, where he was also confronted with objections related to the Hungarian government. Here, Szijjártó essentially repeated the government's previously stated main panels in this regard, and rejected several accusations. These included denying that they would not work on breaking away from Russian energy dependence despite ongoing strengthening of Russian cooperation because, according to Szijjártó, the infrastructure of alternative energy sources still did not exist. He also rejected steps taken to "exercise pressure" from abroad, even if it came from the United States. And he did not answer several questions about whether he would like to see Ukraine as the winner of the war, and said that, "there is no military solution to the conflict."

In a longer analysis presented in the spring of 2023, the Radio Free Europe/Radio Liberty portal examined the mutual wartime communication of the Hungarian and Russian governments, where, in addition to the changing narrative according to the current political aspects, it was also seen that the Russians also repeatedly referred to Orbán and the Hungarian government in their own criticism of the West. In their campaigns and in other mentions, they named Hungary as an ally.

On May 23, 2023, at an economic forum held in Qatar, Orbán said, among other things, that the war was a failure of diplomacy and should never have happened, and then added: "[The Ukrainians] have no chance of winning this war." [...] "The main question is not who attacked whom, but what will happen the next morning: more people will die." He then spoke again about the ceasefire and peace talks. He also criticized Ukraine because it had recently restricted the operation of OTP Bank's local branches, citing that the bank "supports the war against Ukraine" according to the local corruption prevention agency. According to Orbán, "if Ukraine expects financial support from us, then show respect and do not blacklist our companies." On October 2, 2023, the Ukrainian anti-corruption agency permanently removed OTP Bank from its list after it reached an agreement with the bank, according to their statement.

In a radio interview on June 2, 2023, Orbán criticized, among other things, the planned 2023 Ukrainian counteroffensive. According to him, "everyone in the West is enthusiastic about the Ukrainian counterattack", however, "if I attack, my losses are three times greater than those who defend themselves. In such circumstances, it is a blood bath to start a counterattack. We need to initiate a ceasefire before then. One of the biggest challenges in politics is admitting your own past mistakes. They have convinced themselves to such an extent that the war can be won with Western support and fighting, that it will be very difficult for them to deviate from this path."

A government video emphasizing peace was also published on the Internet on May 30, 2023, in which the Crimean peninsula, annexed by the Russians in 2014, was not depicted as part of Ukraine on a map of Ukraine, which caused more diplomatic friction and leading to the map being corrected.

The German newspaper Bild also published an interview with Orbán on June 27, 2023, after Yevgeny Prigozhin, the head of the Wagner Group, rebelled against Putin and his military leaders shortly before. According to Orbán, Putin showed strength by neutralizing the rebellion within 24 hours, and he also warned against people trying to understand the operation of Russia from a German or Hungarian point of view, which, according to him, is a "different world". He rejected criticism that Hungarians are pro-Russian as something that "contradicts our historical experience", according to which he is not interested in Putin or Russia, and that he was primarily interested in Hungary and Hungarian interests. He also said that Ukraine has no chance of winning the war, because it will run out of soldiers sooner even with Western aid, and because of Western aid it is "no longer a sovereign country", therefore "peace depends on America". He stated that he did not consider Putin a war criminal because determining war criminals is a task for the post-war period, and if they want to make peace, then it would be difficult to achieve if one of the parties is threatened to be arrested because of it. In the later part of the interview, he stated that "if I wanted to, I could call Putin", but he wouldn't, because according to him, he had no offer for Putin, and Hungary is "not strong enough in Europe to steer events in the direction of peace". Regarding Prigozhin's rebellion, Foreign Minister Péter Szijjártó stated at the same time that he had consulted with the Deputy Prime Minister of Russia, Russian Foreign Minister Sergey Lavrov, and Belarusian Foreign Minister Sergey Alejnyik, adding that he had already been informed by the Belarusian Foreign Minister before the resolution of the situation was made public. In addition, he criticized the "pro-war" countries and said that the Hungarian government does not support arms deliveries to Ukraine.

On June 25, 2023, Fidesz MEP Tamás Deutsch and Orbán a few days later claimed that the EU provides money to Ukraine in an unclear manner without the consent of its member states, including money due to Hungary, and thus "they brought the European Union to the brink of bankruptcy".

In Orbán's radio interview on July 14, he said that "the war will drag on" and that it was the cause of ongoing inflation. He said at the 2023 NATO summit in Vilnius a few days earlier that if "Ukraine had been accepted into NATO, it would have meant an immediate world war", although a country could only be admitted to NATO in peacetime, otherwise, pursuant to Article 5 of the organization, NATO would also become part of the conflict. According to Orbán, "there were those who would have accepted Ukraine anyway, but the majority did not think so." He also criticized the Ukrainians again as being "aggressive, blackmailing, but we have to approach this with understanding, since Zelensky is "fighting for the survival of his people". He added that if Washington wanted peace, "it would happen the next day."

On July 20, Minister of Foreign Affairs and Trade Péter Szijjártó stated that the Hungarian government will block all financial support to Ukraine as long as OTP Bank is on the Ukrainian sanctions list. He also said that the EU would spend 20 billion euros on arms shipments over the next four years, of which approximately 200 million euros would fall to Hungary, and that the war would last for four more years and could cause Hungarians living abroad to become victims. He repeated this opinion at the MCC Festival held in Esztergom on July 29, where he also criticized the EU for labeling those who are pro-peace as "Putinists" in the community.

On October 16, Orbán traveled to China for a Belt and Road Initiative conference, where on October 17 he met with Putin, who at the time had been subject to an international arrest warrant for the first time since the outbreak of the war. Orbán was the only EU prime minister to meet with Putin at that point. There was also a bilateral public hearing between them, where Putin praised Orbán: "he belongs to the small group of European politicians who know how to protect their interests, and he does this persistently, consistently, and in my opinion completely tactfully." Orbán spoke about the "difficult situation" of Hungary–Russia relations, and also called the war a "military operation". Orbán allegedly announced the meeting to NATO and the EU in advance, which was allegedly initiated by the Russian side and deemed as "impossible to avoid it".

At their one-and-a-half-day summit in Brussels at the end of October, the leaders of the EU member states confirmed, among other things, that they will continue to support Ukraine for as long as necessary. Here, Orbán tried to change the text of the announcement so that they only support the Ukrainian army on a bilateral basis while also calling Ukrainian counterattack unsuccessful and believing that Ukraine will not win the war. During his visit to Germany, Hungarian Minister of National Defense Kristóf Szalay-Bobrovniczky responded to a German public television program's question about whether Putin, who was under international arrest warrant, would be arrested if he traveled to Hungary by laughing at the questioner instead of answering.

In November 2023, in the framework of a national consultation survey, several issues concerning Ukraine appeared, which dealt with the delivery of weapons intended for the country, its financial support, its genetically modified grain, and its membership in the EU. In addition to the war, the discussion of Ukraine's future EU membership also became a topic in December 2023. Orbán rigidly rejected the idea, citing the country's state of corruption and insufficient accession conditions, and suggested that the issue be removed from the agenda of the December 2023 EU summit.

On December 14, however, based on a statement by President of the European Council Charles Michel, it was revealed that the accession negotiations will begin with the support of the prime ministers of all EU member states except Orbán; Orbán - who previously stated that "there is no chance of starting negotiations" - did not veto the decision, but left the room during the vote.

At the government briefing held on December 21, 2023, Orbán contradicted himself by saying that the conflict was "not even a war" because "there was no declaration of war between the two parties", and he then explained this by referring to the phrase used at Putin's meeting by saying that "according to the wishes of the guest", he calls it "sometimes a military operation, sometimes a war".

=== 2024 ===
On January 29, 2024, Foreign Minister Péter Szijjártó met his Ukrainian counterpart, Ukrainian Foreign Minister Dmytro Kuleba, for the first time in Uzhhorod since the outbreak of the war. Szijjártó said that "we stand for the territorial integrity and sovereignty of Ukraine". However, the 50 billion euro aid intended for Ukraine vetoed by the Hungarian government was also discussed, where he said its fate lies in "Brussels". The Ukrainian side indicated that the peace mentioned by Szijjártó could not be based on the current conditions. Andriy Yermak, head of the Ukrainian presidential office, stated: "Ferenc Rákóczi, Sándor Petőfi, didn't they want peace? No one wants peace more than the Ukrainians. But we want a just peace, not a peace based on frozen conflict.” The Ukrainian language law objected to by the Hungarian government was also discussed, which the Ukrainian side stated they were open to changing, and Kuleba thanked Hungary for its humanitarian assistance.

On February 1, 2024, Orbán voted for the 50 billion euro aid package for Ukraine he had regularly vetoed in the previous months and which was the central topic of the 2023 national consultation. Orbán reported on this in a video message: "We negotiated a control mechanism that guarantees the rational use of the money, and we received a guarantee that Hungary's money will not go to Ukraine. After a long negotiation, we accepted this offer."

In a radio interview on April 19, Orbán again spoke about how, in his opinion, the leaders of the EU and NATO see the conflict as "their own war", which is "a war of two Slavic peoples, not ours". Péter Szijjártó accused NATO of having "world war preparations" in the organization due to the "war psychosis" of the leaders.

In April 2024, citing Gedeon Richter, the government blocked the next two-billion-euro installment of aid to Ukraine under the European Peace Framework. According to the Hungarian government, Ukraine wanted to revoke the licenses of fourteen medicines marketed by Richter, and claimed that there was no reason for this. Péter Szijjártó brought up the previous sanctions against the OTP and called on Ukraine to stop the "witch hunt against active Hungarian companies", otherwise they would not be able to support the payment of aid.

During the campaign period of the 2024 European Parliament elections, the Hungarian government's communications regularly referred to its political opponents as "pro-war", against whom the government defined itself as "pro-peace". In the government's letter campaign with Orbán's message, he also tried to encourage pro-government votes by emphasizing the dangers of war while criticizing Brussels politicians who he believed were "pro-war".

Meanwhile, Péter Szijjártó announced on May 17 that he had vetoed the peace plan proposed by Volodymyr Zelenskyy in the European Council. According to his reasons, the board would have supported only the peace plan of the Ukrainian president while not considering or incorporating other peace plans, and also that the Russian side was left out of the negotiation of the peace plan.

On May 27, Szijjártó also vetoed the EU's financial aid for military purposes to Ukraine. According to him, arms deliveries only escalate the war, and therefore the Hungarian government did not agree to such aid. Szijjártó also mentioned the "crazy idea" that the EU would like to introduce conscription from EU member states, which Josep Borrell denied. At the same time, several EU foreign ministers sharply criticized Hungary for regularly obstructing the EU's acceptance of military aid, which they stated "costs human lives". The Belgian foreign minister, Hadja Lahbib, also urged the EU member states to carry out a procedure that would deprive Orbán of his right to vote, which was supported by the Austrian foreign ministry shortly afterwards.

Two days later, Szijjártó was the only EU foreign minister who abstained from voting on the punitive tariff on agricultural products imported from Russia and Belarus, after he had negotiated in Minsk a day earlier, where he said: "We Hungarians do not believe in the sanctions policy, the sanctions policy failed."

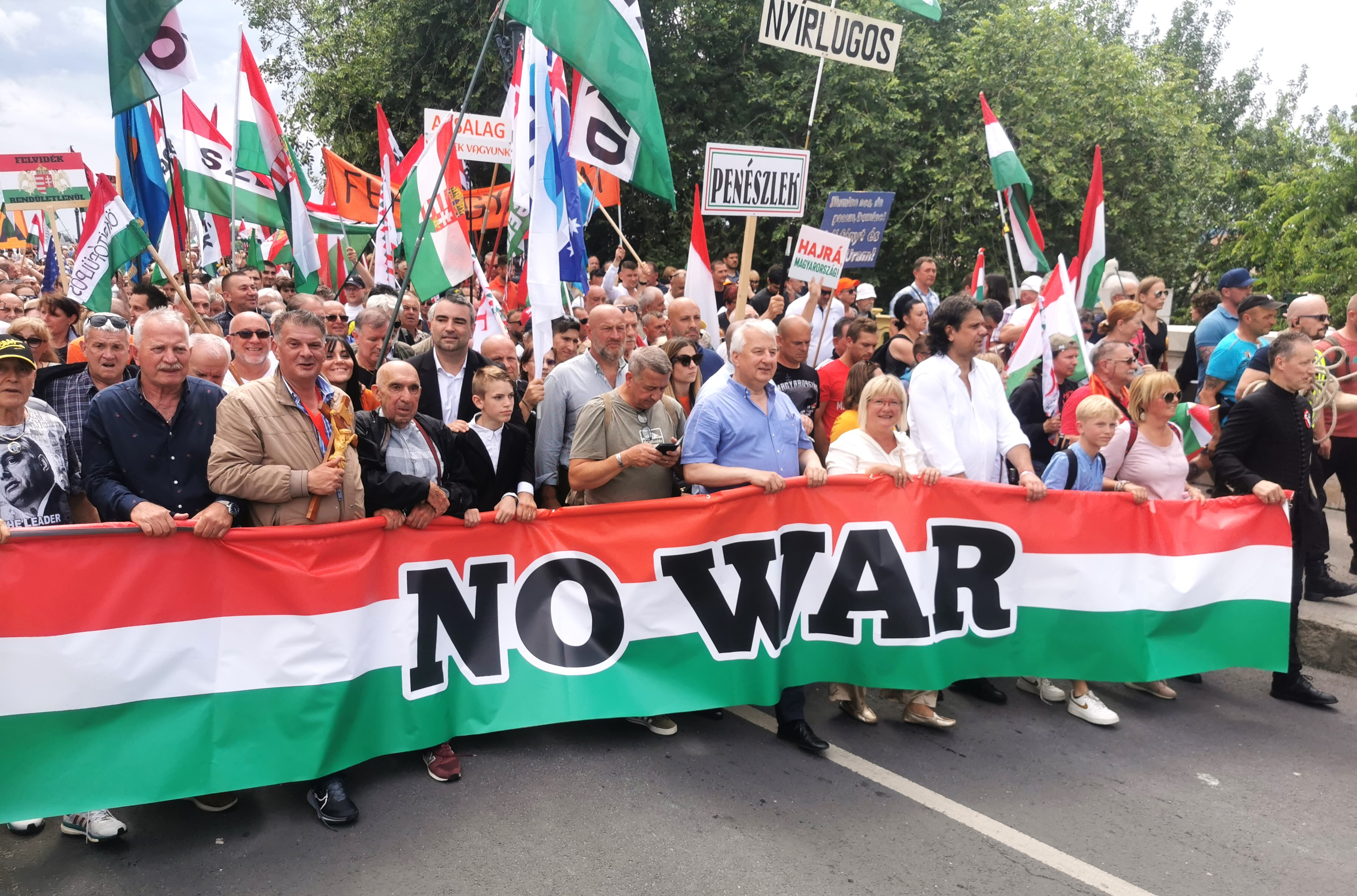
Anti-war demonstration in Budapest

On June 1, 2024, tens of thousands marched in Budapest in a peace march. People waved flags and signs reading "No War".

Orbán also indicated on June 4 that Fidesz wants to join the European Conservatives and Reformists (ECR) party family chaired by Giorgia Meloni. Riikka Purra, Finnish Minister of Finance, ECR member and president of the Finns Party, stated: "The attitude of the Hungarian Fidesz towards Ukraine and its support for Ukraine, and its support for Russia, is simply disgusting. We do not share it at all.”

On June 12, 2024, NATO Secretary General Jens Stoltenberg held talks with Orbán in Budapest, during which Orbán spoke in a more conciliatory tone about, among other things, the fact that "Hungary has made it clear that it does not wish to block decisions in NATO that — although they differ from the reasonable ones arising from our interpretation of the situation from decisions — decisions shared and advocated by the other member states." Stoltenberg accepted Orbán's points that Hungary, as a NATO member, does not wish to participate in war operations in any form.

In June 2024, bypassing Hungary, the European Union decided to accept a financial package intended for Ukraine based on Russian frozen assets. Josep Borrell, the EU High Representative for Foreign Affairs, said that since the Hungarian government had not previously voted on the use of the profits on the frozen assets, it is now not entitled to have a say in how the community uses it. In response, Szijjártó stated that there were "new billions for Ukraine — now by breaking European rules and leaving Hungary out." According to the Financial Times, the EU was actively working to avoid Hungarian government vetoes. The newspaper also reported that Hungarian officials raised a possible agreement for Budapest to lift its veto on the 6.6 billion euros directed to Ukraine if the Hungarian government gets full access to the 6.3 billion euros of EU funds before mid-December, which was frozen due to concerns about the rule of law and corruption. However, this proposal was rejected in Brussels.

Orbán traveled to Kyiv on July 2, 2024, as the President-in-Office of the European Union, for the first time since the outbreak of the war. Here, instead of the more critical tone spoken during his prior visit, he spoke in a much friendlier tone. The prime minister proposed to Ukrainian President Volodymyr Zelenskyy to consider the possibility of a cease-fire, which he claimed would allow Ukraine to start peace negotiations with Russia. The Ukrainian reaction to the suggestion was ambiguous; Ukrainian President Zelenskyy said that the fundamental issues of the two countries were being discussed, which could form the basis of an interstate agreement. At the same time, he expressed that the Russian peace proposal would essentially be equivalent to the capitulation of Ukraine, and there was no guarantee in Orbán's proposal that Russia would come up with an offer representing a real basis for negotiations. Later, the Ukrainian side clearly rejected Orbán's suggestion. The international press also drew attention to the event, emphasizing the "stormy" relationship between Ukraine and Hungary in the past two years juxtaposed to the exceptional closeness of Hungarian and Russian relations. According to analysts, Orbán tried to present himself as an important player in the peace issue. Charles Michel, the president of the European Council, warned at the same time that the consecutive presidency of the Union with Orbán in the highest role did not have the authority to contact Russia on behalf of the EU and conduct peace negotiations without the involvement of Ukraine.

Michel's warning came after it was revealed that Orbán was going to Russia to negotiate with Putin two days after his trip to Kyiv, which happened on July 5. The EU was not informed about Orbán's trip to Russia, but NATO was, with Secretary General Jens Stoltenberg also stating that Orbán was not negotiating on behalf of NATO. According to Orbán, he wanted to use the meeting to "discuss important issues with the Russian president, and he would like to know his position on some issues that are important to Europe." The Hungarian government expressed this trip, as well as previous ones, as a "peace mission", where Orbán again drew attention to the importance of peace in the conflict. According to his statements, Putin— who thanked Orbán for his visit and his steps to create peace— was willing to resolve the conflict through negotiations, but at the same time he blamed the countries that he claimed used Ukraine as a "battering ram" against Russia. Even before his trip to Moscow, Orbán claimed that he did not travel to Kyiv in an EU capacity, but on the other hand, the official EU presidency logo was clearly displayed on government websites about the meetings in Kyiv and Moscow.

=== 2025 ===
In July 2025, Hungary imposed an entry ban on Ukrainian military officials amid a diplomatic dispute caused by the death of a dual Hungarian-Ukrainian citizen who died in disputed circumstances following his mobilization into the Ukrainian military.

In September, Hungary blocked access to twelve Ukrainian news sites after Ukraine had blocked eight Hungarian-language sites that contained pro-Russian views.

2025 Budapest Summit.

=== 2026 ===
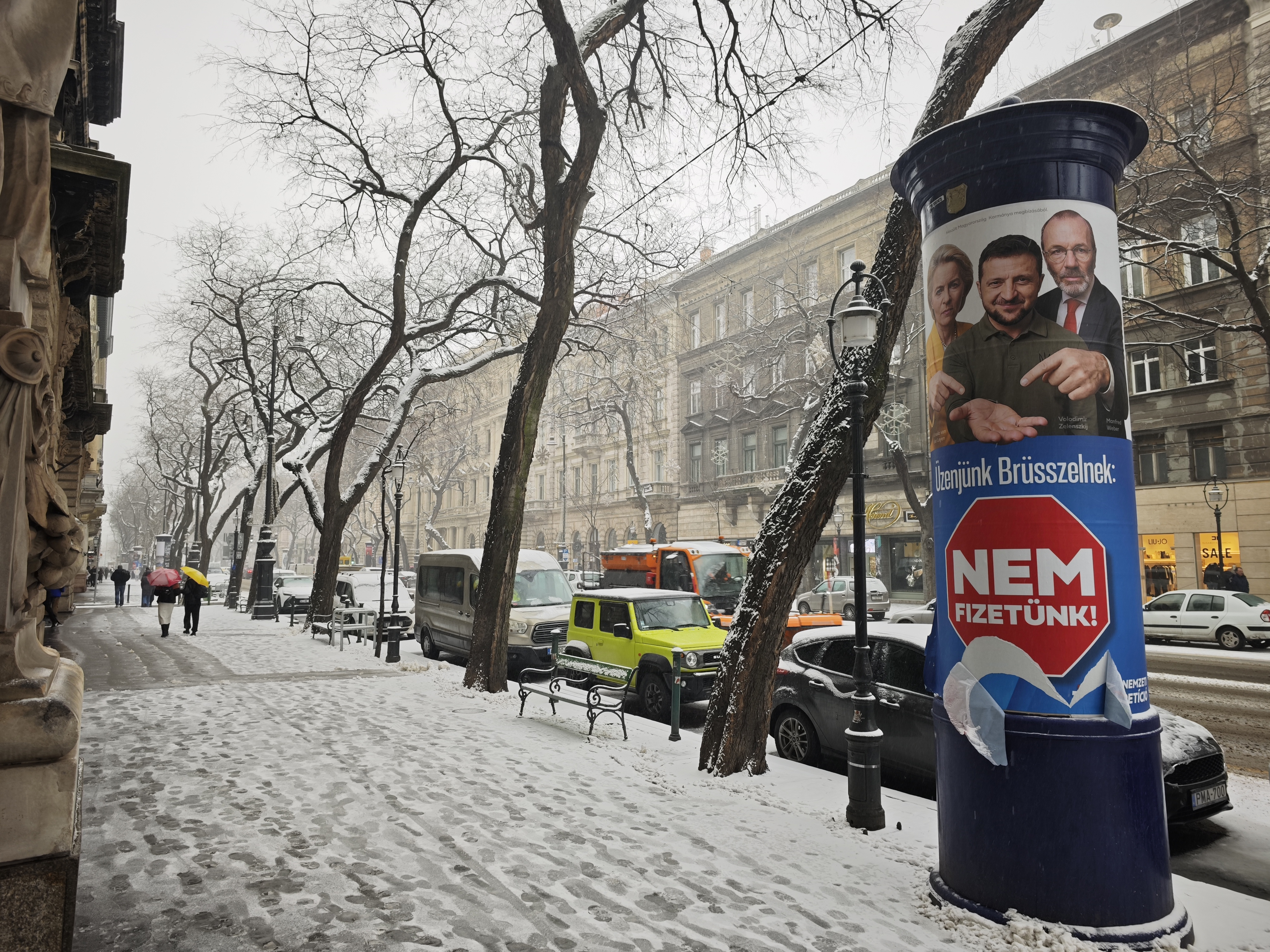
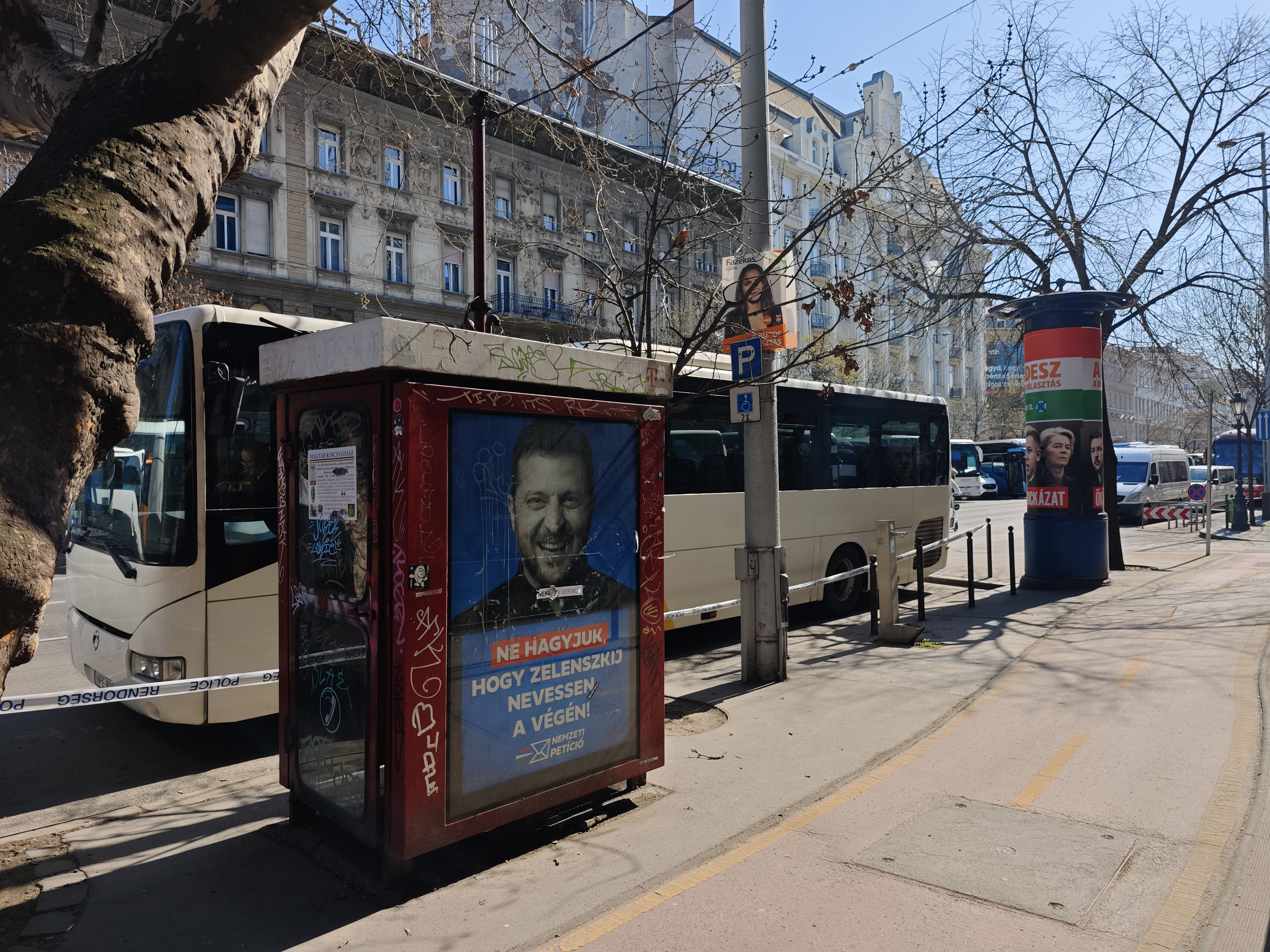
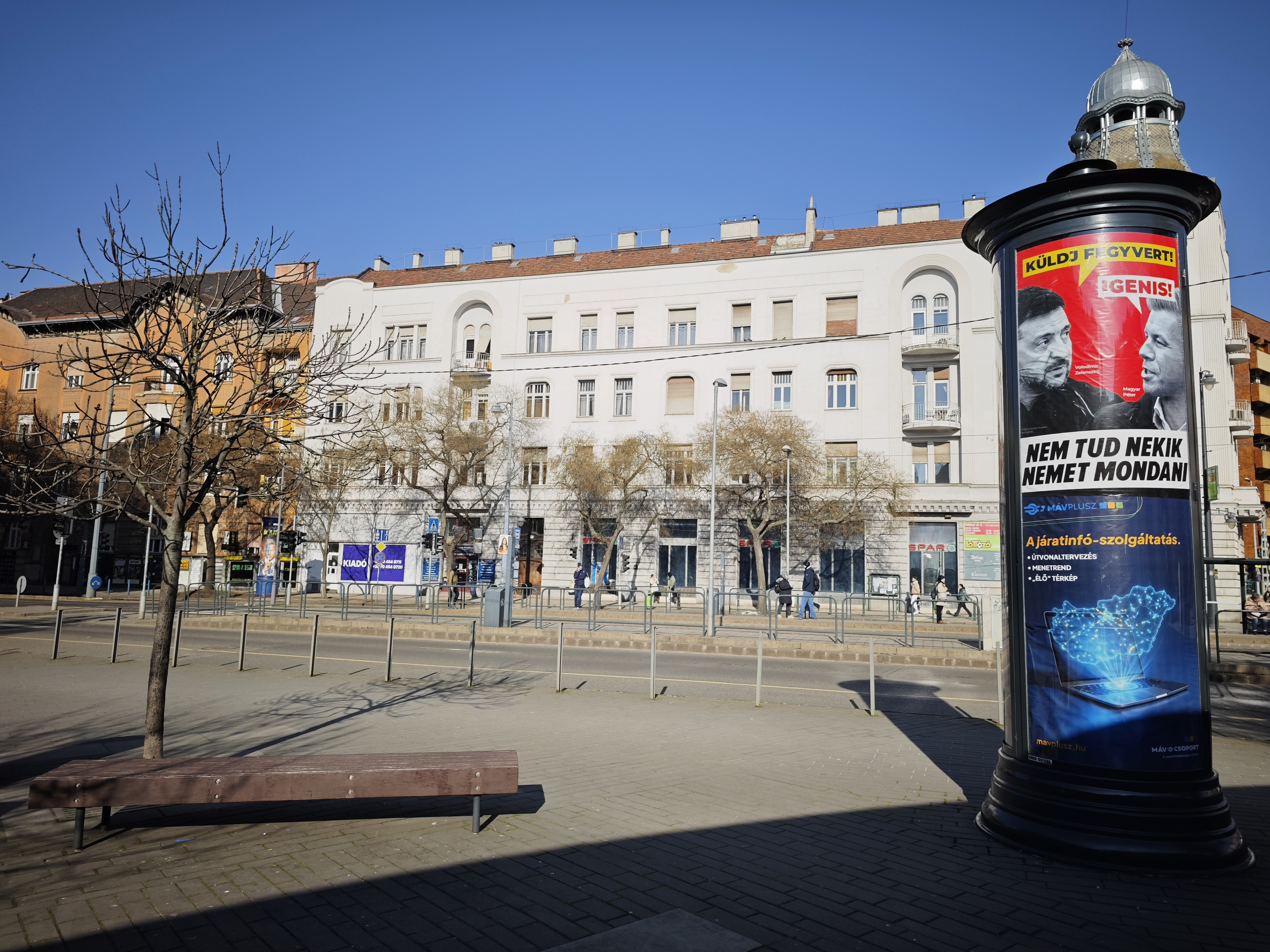
2026 election posters and billboards nationwide have accused opposition and European politicians – such as Péter Magyar, Ursula von der Leyen, Volodymyr Zelenskyy, and Manfred Weber – of dragging Hungary into war by sending weapons and troops, while Fidesz is depicted as the only option for peace.

2026 Hungarian–Ukraine oil dispute.

During the 2026 Hungarian parliamentary election, the Hungarian government accused the Ukrainian government of interfering in the elections and the main opposition Péter Magyar's Tisza Party of trying to get Hungary involved in the Russo-Ukrainian war.

== Criticism of the Hungarian government ==
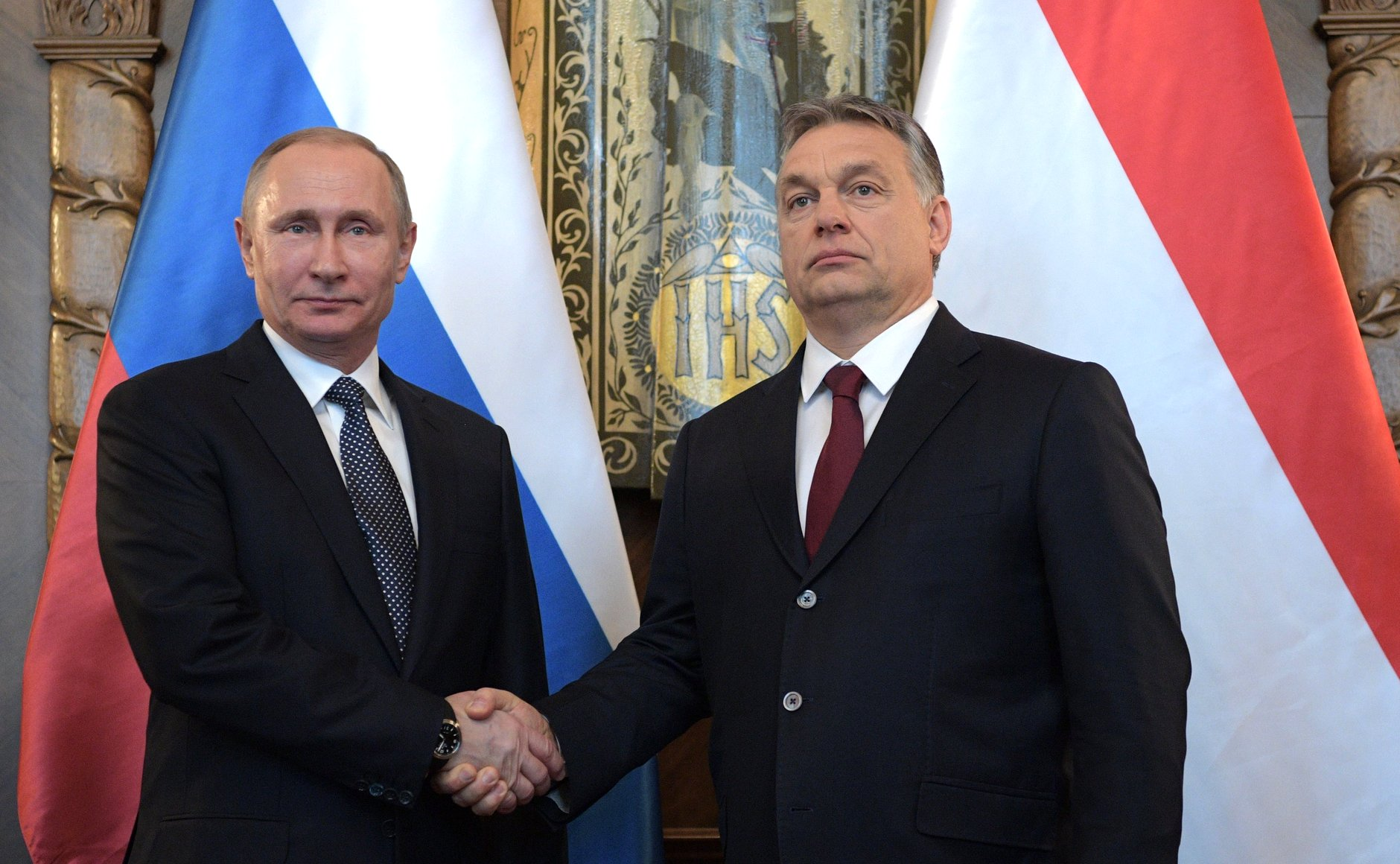
Russian President Vladimir Putin and Hungarian Prime Minister Viktor Orbán meeting in 2017

The Hungarian government was criticized by the opposition within the country from the beginning of the war. This was firstly because they were not willing to provide military assistance to Ukraine, and then also because it did not provide sufficient assistance to the Ukrainian refugees, leaving civilians to deal with the influx on their own for a long time. The country's leadership was also criticized by the opposition regarding the International Investment Bank (IIB) founded by Putin and having its headquarters in Budapest a few years earlier, holding diplomatic powers. The criticism was based on the fact that the Orbán government did not sever its relationship with IIB, which the opposition had already referred to as Russia's "spy bank". After the outbreak of the war, the bank was significantly downgraded by Fitch and S&P, from which Romania, the Czech Republic, Bulgaria, and Slovakia also indicated their intention to withdraw, only Hungary remained as the only European shareholder, which, according to the government, has an interest in the bank's national development loans. Later, the Hungarian government received more criticism from abroad because of its pro-Russian attitude towards the war, both from Ukraine, the EU and the United States. In April 2023, the Hungarian government finally withdrew from the IIB, after the US government put it and its three leaders on the sanctions list due to its interests close to Russia. The bank then announced that its stay in the European Union had become pointless due to the sanction, so it withdrew from Hungary and moved back to Russia.

Many journalists and analysts stated that although the Hungarian government has repeatedly spoken about peace, emphasizing that "Hungary and the Vatican only want peace in Europe", the statements of Pope Francis in which he often praised Ukraine and condemned Russian aggression were regularly omitted from media close to the government.

László Kövér's opinion on May 15, where he talked about Zelenskyy's "psychological problem", was sharply criticized by the Ukrainian presidential office, describing the speaker as disrespectful and insignificant, confronting him with the horrors of wars and their psychological effects. According to the reaction of the Ukrainian Ministry of Foreign Affairs, it "expects" Kövér's own mental state to be verified, because they can only evaluate his statements based on this knowledge.

Ukrainian President Volodymyr Zelenskyy criticized Orbán after Hungary vetoed an EU embargo on Russian gas supplies. According to Orbán, Hungary is highly dependent on Russian gas, and there are no EU plans to replace it. The Hungarian veto caused a major foreign policy controversy. For the same reasons, Orbán obstructed the EU's proposed ban on Russian crude oil imports for a month, and it was only at the end of May 2023 that a compromise solution beneficial to Hungary was found, according to which the import ban only applies to oil imported by oil tankers, not to oil arriving by pipeline. With this, the existing Hungarian supply will be maintained. At the same time, it was also revealed that Hungary covers only 2% of Russian oil exports, so the amended sanction did not significantly change much from its prior state.

Former Ukrainian President Petro Poroshenko also criticized Orbán for his close Russian business ties, saying he would gladly take him to Bucha and other Ukrainian settlements where Russian forces massacred the locals.

In the meantime, former Russian Prime Minister Dmitry Medvedev published a map showing Ukraine as largely Russian territory and Subcarpathia belonging to Hungary. This was classified as simple confusion, but according to former finance minister László Békesi, it cannot be ruled out that behind Orbán's pro-Russian expressions is the fact that he received a promise to rejoin Transcarpathia from Putin. He also mentioned that Orbán sells some of the gas received from the Russians to third countries at a premium, after Hungary sold 500 million cubic meters of gas to Serbia at the same time.

Orbán's speech in Băile Tușnad on July 23, 2022, in which he made several controversial statements criticizing the European Union, NATO and their measures in connection with the war, also provoked many criticisms and refutations, after his speech essentially excused Russia's aggression towards Ukraine. The most important criticisms in this regard:

- In addition to Transcarpathian Hungarians, others, such as Poles and Romanians, also died in the fighting, and Hungary did not give Ukraine any help during the war such as a weapon transport route, and thus did not grant it Transcarpathian Hungarians.
- By signing the Budapest Memorandum in 1994, Russia expressed its intention to respect the political independence and sovereignty of Ukraine;
- The "security demand" of the Russians was an ultimatum that would have dictated the relationship between the sovereign Ukraine and NATO, and moreover it would have demanded the territorial status of NATO in 1997, when Hungary was not a NATO member either;
- The territorial claim threatening Russian security was also regarded as unrealistic because modern missiles can reach Russia from outside Ukraine in the same way;
- Although the Russians have not openly attacked NATO countries, they have proven to carry out cyber attacks against the West and other disruptive and influence-building activities;
- Hungary has also not started the process of energy independence, which would make it less and less dependent on Russian energy. In addition, numerous reports confirmed Russia's economic difficulties caused by sanctions.

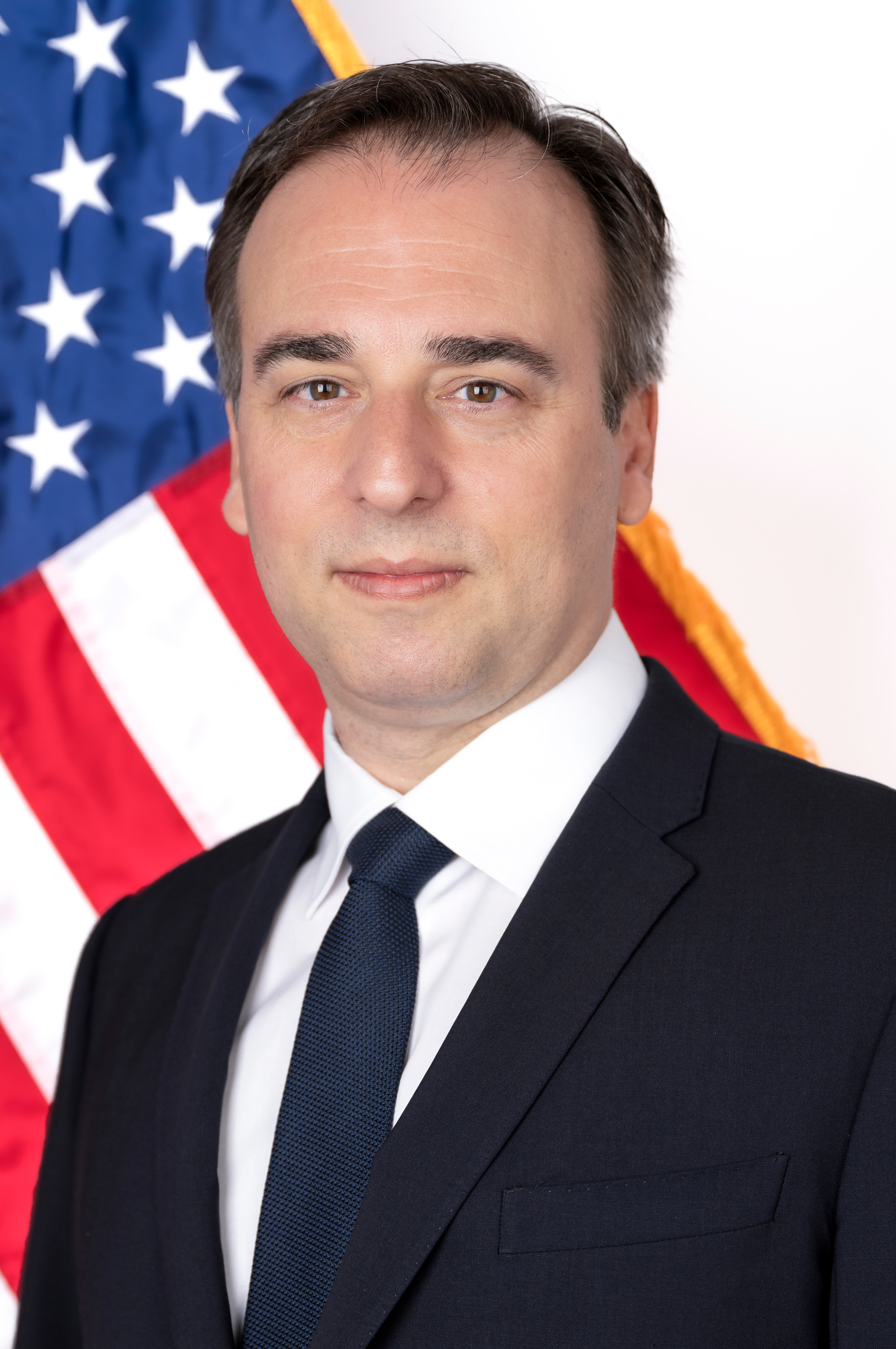
David Pressman, former United States ambassador to Hungary 2022-2025

The Hungarian government continued to pursue a controversial policy on the issue of the conflict: it criticized the EU sanctions, but at the same time voted for all of them in the European Commission; nevertheless, it also launched a national consultation on the issue. In a longer article, Direkt36 analyzed the government's reactions, in which many notable pro-Russian gestures were made, including Foreign Minister Péter Szijjártó meeting several times with Russian Foreign Minister Sergey Lavrov as the only European Union foreign minister to do so. According to the article, the government initially did not take the possibility of a real war seriously, and Orbán evaluated the conflict as an attempt to gain influence by the US, and after Zelenskyy openly criticized Orbán on March 24, they used the criticism to build a campaign on energy sanctions as potentially threatening the country's energy supply. He stated that the rising price of natural gas was a reason for the Hungarian government to maintain good relations with Russia. David Pressman, the ambassador of the United States to Hungary, also criticized the notably pro-Russian actions of the Hungarian foreign minister despite aggressive actions against Ukraine by Russia. Pressman and Szijjártó later had a verbal exchange after Szijjártó said that the ambassador's opinion criticizing the government was uninteresting because "sovereign Hungary is not told from abroad how to live and politicize it", to which Pressman replied: "Respectfully, we do not consider Russia’s attempt to unilaterally redraw the borders of Europe as just a “domestic political development in Hungary.'" The Bratislava meeting of the speakers of the V4 countries planned for the end of November was also canceled after the Czech and Polish speakers announced a boycott due to the Hungarian government's Russian policy. Earlier, the Slovak foreign minister also criticized the Hungarian government for this. According to Speaker László Kövér, the accusations were "unjust and disrespectful". Meanwhile, Fidesz representatives, even though they were present, did not vote in the European Parliament vote where Russia was deemed a "state supporting terrorism" due to the crimes committed against Ukrainian civilians.

=== 2023 ===
At a panel discussion in February 2023, French Green Party politician Gwendoline Delbos-Corfield stated that Hungary posed a threat to the European Union because, in her opinion, the Hungarian secret services leaked intelligence to the Russians. Here, she also touched on the fact that the Orbán government spread misinformation such as claims that the EU would send young Hungarians to the war in Ukraine. However, she later corrected herself by admitting that he had no proof of the leaks; she understood what he was saying to mean that the Russians already hacked the servers of the Hungarian Foreign Ministry last year, and since then no reassuring message has been received from the Hungarian side to avert this risk. At the same time, Defense Intelligence also published a longer article about the fact that Western civil intelligence services no longer share information with Hungarian counterparts, precisely because of the high risk of Russian influence. Documents released in the spring of 2024 proved that the Foreign Ministry knew about the Russian hacker attacks, which they had denied two years ago.

Foreign Minister Péter Szijjártó's trip to Minsk in February 2023 also drew criticism, given that Belarus was Russia's only overt European ally. During the trip, he discussed with the Belarusian foreign minister about preventing the escalation of the war, here, in addition to the usual government narrative that "peace is needed between the two sides", he mentioned that he will probably be attacked because of this trip. Criticism also came from Belarusian opposition leader Sviatlana Tsikhanouskaya, who left the country after the state crackdown on protests after the 2020 Belarusian elections. Tykhanovskaya said after the Hungarian visit that "Such a step is unacceptable at a time when Nobel laureates are being brought to court in Belarus, journalists are being tortured, and Russian soldiers are being trained there before being sent to the Ukrainian front." At the time of the visit, a Russian government machine was also in Minsk, so some opinions did not rule out that Szijjártó actually negotiated with the Russians under the pretext of the visit, while he could not find time to meet with the Ukrainian foreign minister since the outbreak of the war. The European Parliament also indicated that it disapproved of Szijjártó's trip to Minsk.

At the same time as Szijjártó's trip to Minsk, an article was published in The Guardian which analyzed the Hungarian government's attitude to the war at length, in which they also discussed the pro-Russian expressions of Orbán, who was described as a "far-right prime minister". They stated that even if a country disputes certain steps in relation to the war, it does not voice it as publicly as the Orbán government in a way which would weaken the united stance, and it is likely that the Hungarian government took this position in the hope of some kind of Russian reciprocation.

Orbán's annual review held on February 18, 2023, was also reacted to by the opposition, who believe that Orbán's speech was blaming everyone else instead of his own government and Russia while together with Orbán's government, causing him be perceived as losing credibility and casting a bad light on Hungary. He fell out of EU support and wanted to explain the missteps in his twelve years of government with past-looking ideologies. Several people also mentioned that Orbán and his government consistently made untruthful statements not justified by facts and results, and they pointed out that Orbán seems to behave like "Putin and Moscow's henchman who betrays the Western federal system."

József Kis-Benedek, a security policy and military expert, criticized the majority of the Hungarian media for talking too much about the possible world war mentioned by Orbán from March 2023, on the one hand because this is an interpretation more in line with Russian propaganda. On the other hand, according to Kis-Benedek, the conflict reflects more as part of local and regional wars instead of world wars. As he put it: “This is war psychosis, where people are fooled into being afraid, but we protect you. Which is a very bad policy because people are not stupid.”

During the discussion of the proposed resolution submitted by the governing parties in connection with the one-year anniversary of the war, which was later adopted, the opposition mainly criticized the government's concept of peace, which they referred to as Russia's peace where Ukraine gives up the fight. In addition, they stated that the government did not mention that Putin and Russia started the war. The government's passages criticizing the EU and its other Western allies were also criticized, as well as its attempts to portray itself as fighting for peace alone.

Criticism was also received from the Kremlin after Orbán mentioned the possibility of EU peacekeepers in his radio interview on March 31, which, according to the Russian government spokesman, is a "potentially very dangerous topic" because it usually happens with bilateral consent.

In an article published by the newspaper Politico on April 14, they wrote that contrary to the Hungarian government's claim that it prohibits the transfer of war materials to Ukraine through the country's territory, it can actually secretly allow its allies to use its airspace to transport weapons. The newspaper contacted the Hungarian government, but received no answers.

To Orbán's words in Qatar on May 23, 2023, that "the Ukrainians have no chance of winning this war" and that "the main question is not who attacked whom" the spokesperson of the Ukrainian Ministry of Foreign Affairs responded as follows: "The Kremlin can be happy: the Hungarian Prime Minister dismissed Russian responsibility for the aggression against Ukraine. Ukrainians will fight until all their territories are freed from Russian occupation. This is the only way to restore peace in Ukraine and guarantee the security of all of Europe."

This also led to a conflict between the Hungarian government and Ukraine, because according to the Ukrainian corruption prevention agency, OTP Bank "supports the war against Ukraine", and therefore restricted the operation of the bank's local branches in May 2023. According to their reasoning, the bank continued to operate in Russia, and they also complied with the lending law allowing Russians to finance the Luhansk and Donetsk People's Republics. Orbán also criticized Ukraine for this reason and made Hungary's financial support dependent on the withdrawal of the measure. On the other hand, the Ukrainian organization made it clear that OTP indirectly supports Russia's war with the taxes it pays to Russia due to its business interests. On October 2, however, it was announced in a statement that OTP was removed from the list of problematic companies after consultation with the bank.

Orbán's statements in his radio interview on June 2, 2023, according to which the planned Ukrainian counterattack would "result in three times as much loss and bloodshed", were criticized by Mihajlo Podoljak, adviser to the head of the Ukrainian presidential office, in a longer Twitter post in which he said: "Viktor Orbán his absurd stance once again demonstratively violates the values of the European Union and international law in general. This is the deliberate humiliation of Europe and the condoning of Russia's terrorist actions. This is the aggressor's deliberate justification and encouragement for further destruction of Ukraine/Europe." According to Podoljak, the recovery of Ukraine's territories and people is "an obligatory and just task. If the Hungarian Prime Minister is really worried about the casualties, he should call his "friend Putin" and ask him to withdraw the Russian armed forces from the internationally recognized borders of Ukraine. And then the war is over. No more victims.” He added: "a prerequisite for ending the war is the complete withdrawal of the occupying armed forces and their equipment. Has anyone heard such an appeal from Orbán addressed to Russia?" Ukrainian foreign affairs spokesman Oleh Nikolenko drew attention to the fact that if Orbán is "the only pro-peace prime minister of the EU", he should finally act: "For example, condemn Russia's aggression, demand from Moscow an end to the war and the return of the Russian army to Russian territory, join the international isolation of Russia measures and not undermine EU unity."

In the government's video announcing peace published on May 30, 2023, a map of Ukraine was also shown, but Crimea, which was annexed by the Russians in 2014, was not depicted as part of Ukraine. The incident provoked further diplomatic criticism from the Ukrainian side, as they wrote: "The designation of the Crimean peninsula as a territory not belonging to Ukraine contradicts Budapest's official, repeatedly stated position, according to which it supports Ukraine's sovereignty and territorial integrity within its internationally recognized borders." A few days later, a corrected version of the video was released.

American Ambassador David Pressman made a sharp criticism of the Orbán government when he spoke at a reception in honor of American-Hungarian scientific cooperation on June 7, 2023. Pressman's criticism was clearly aimed at the "further strengthening" relationship between the Hungarian government and Russia, while Russia is attacking Ukraine.

A significant diplomatic scandal was also caused by the incident when, according to a statement on June 8, 2023, Russia handed over eleven prisoners of war from Transcarpathia to Hungary without Ukraine ever being informed about the transfer. According to Ukrainian criticism, the details of the handover were not known, and they were not informed about the condition of the prisoners of war involved, which presents Hungarian cooperation in a bad light. The transfer, accompanied by unclear circumstances and contradictions, was also later criticized. In addition to Ukraine, the European Commission also demanded clarification of the details from Hungary, while the Russian side denied the handover.

In an interview given to Bild in June 2023, Orbán believed that the reason for Ukraine's defeat was that, even with Western help, they would run out of soldiers compared to the superiority of the Russians. This opinion provoked criticism because, throughout history, smaller teams have often succeeded in winning over larger powers. According to former EP representative István Szent-Iványi, Orbán's Bild interview is "Orbán's moral low point", where he "declares his loyalty to Putin", while repeatedly contradicting himself and giving the impression that "no matter what, just talk about him". Ukrainian Foreign Minister Dmitro Kuleba also gave an interview to Bild a day later, where he said that he thought Orbán's interview was "blah-blah-blah", since Ukraine can show victories again and again despite all pessimistic opinions. He added that he would like to hope that despite his "political views similar to those of the Kremlin", Orbán is still an ally of the EU and NATO.

After Péter Szijjártó repeated his previously stated opinion at the MCC Festival in Esztergom on July 29, that the EU "expects that there will definitely be another four years of war" due to arms deliveries, while criticizing those who want peace between Slovak Foreign Minister Miroslav Wlachovský and Hungarian Foreign Affairs. Wlachovský complained that Szijjártó was speaking on behalf of others, because the 27 member states of the Union did not have a discussion where they would have decided on the continuation of the war for four years, making it clear that Russia must stop the war it started. Secretary of State Tamás Menczer reacted to the words of the Slovak Foreign Minister, who said that Wlachovský was not right in supporting arms shipments, because there would be no solution to the war on the battlefield. After State Secretary Zoltán Kovács tweeted Menczer's reaction, Wlachovský responded to Kovács with unsolicited words, again clarifying that the Russian aggressors must stop the war.

In an interview on August 11, Ivanna Klympush-Tsintsadze, the president of the EU integration committee of the Ukrainian parliament, criticized the Hungarian-Russian relationship and said that the Hungarian government is indirectly helping Russia to kill the Ukrainians with its attitude while calling it politics. She also spoke about the fact that, although they greatly appreciated the support and help provided to the refugees in Ukraine, they are at the same time puzzled by the fact that the name of Patriarch Kirill was removed from the EU sanctions list by the Orbán government. She said of him: "this man has nothing to do with his church it is not to be believed, it is a secret service tool whose purpose is to participate in the destruction of the Ukrainian nation and statehood.” In addition, she criticized the fact that several measures aimed at helping Ukraine were being obstructed on the Hungarian side. Regarding the Ukrainian language law, which had been objected to several times, she said that Ukraine would hold a dialogue with the minority representatives. However, Hungarian representatives did not show up at the prearranged meetings in several cases, allegedly because they were instructed to do so from Budapest.

Orbán's meeting with Putin in China on October 17 also provoked several criticisms. American Ambassador David Pressman wrote in a Twitter post: "Hungary’s leader chooses to stand with a man whose forces are responsible for crimes against humanity in Ukraine, and alone among our Allies. While Russia strikes Ukrainian civilians, Hungary pleads for business deals.” In addition to Pressman, the Estonian Prime Minister Kaja Kallas and the German Ambassador to Budapest Julia Gross also criticized the meeting. The criticisms were rejected by Péter Szijjártó and Gergely Gulyás. Because of the meeting, the ambassadors of the NATO member countries and the ambassador of Sweden to Hungary also held a meeting on October 19, after which they reported that the NATO members were increasingly worried about Hungary's deepening relationship with Russia. Szijjártó reacted to the ambassador's meeting by saying that "he hopes that the American ambassador will also report to his colleagues that the United States bought 416 tons of uranium from Russia in the first half of 2023."

Although the top leaders of the EU member states did not criticize Orbán much for his meeting with Putin at their meeting at the end of October, according to Luxembourg Prime Minister Xavier Bettel, Orbán also insulted the Ukrainian soldiers fighting on the front with this meeting. At the same time, French President Emmanuel Macron stated that no one can be forbidden to meet with whomever they want, but it is expected that they agree with their partners on the meeting details before and after. Ursula von der Leyen also had a similar opinion. According to the leaders who made the statement, Orbán has so far contributed to preserving the unity of the EU, and for them this is what is really important.

Historian Krisztián Ungváry sharply criticized Orbán after the prime minister said on December 21 that there is no war in Ukraine because there was no declaration of war. In his Facebook post, Ungváry wrote that "Orbán speaks untruths and even nonsense", in addition to saying that this is "Putinist propaganda". "Hungary did not declare war on the Soviet Union either, yet it entered the Second World War. Based on Miklós Horthy's instructions, Prime Minister László Bárdossy announced in parliament that "martial law has ended" [...] Of course I understand why: if there is no war, then there is no war crime either. Then the mass murderer Putin and Lavrov can be dear friends. It's always lower."

=== 2024 ===
Polish Prime Minister Donald Tusk visited Kyiv in January 2024, where he assured Zelenskyy of his support, and he also criticized Orbán: "Those who silently support Putin betray Europe in every way, so they will be remembered and will not be forgiven," he said.

On January 25, the American ambassador David Pressman again criticized the Hungarian government because, in his opinion, the government creates imaginary depictions of enemies: "The Hungarians have this idea that it’s a political communications device where they’re constantly talking about imperialists and colonialists and Brussels and George Soros – and all of these entities who are trying to ‘interfere’ in its domestic politics – and it's really a fantasy... And it's a fantasy that is serving some political purpose in this country, but is also distracting from some of the real challenges and opportunities that Hungary has.”

The government has been criticized for not joining the statement issued by the US State Department condemning North Korea's arms shipments to Russia. Fifty countries signed the declaration, Hungary and Slovakia did not. Opposition politicians inquired about not signing the declaration, after the government claimed it was pro-peace and opposed to all arms transfers, but the lack of signature raised the question of whether it was all of them or just Western arms transfers, according to the representatives. According to the reply of State Secretary of Foreign Affairs Péter Sztáray, the reason for not signing the declaration was that the government did not yet consider the delivery of weapons to North Korea to be a proven fact.

On March 14, 2024, in his speech on the occasion of the 25th anniversary of Hungary's accession to NATO, American Ambassador David Pressman again criticized the Hungarian government's attitude to the war. Responding to the government's narrative of peace, he said: "Does Hungary really think that if our partners and allies no longer provide military support to Ukraine, while it is fighting for its survival on its own territory, then Russia will sit at the negotiating table?" Or would he do what he has already done elsewhere, to lay his hands on even more territory, plunder even more property, deprive the people of the country of their freedom to an even greater extent, and kidnap even more children? Hungarian politics is based on the illusion that the disarmament of Ukraine will stop Putin. However, history shows that the opposite would happen. This is not a peace proposal; it is capitulation.” He added that this attitude is contrary to the basic concept of NATO. The ambassador also expressed this opinion at a panel discussion at an event in Arizona in May.

Due to the constantly obstructing attitude of the Hungarian government, the Belgian and Austrian foreign affairs have also confirmed that they will urge the Article 7 procedure against Hungary, which may even lead to the withdrawal of Hungarian voting rights.

After Orbán traveled to Kyiv on July 2, 2024, for the first time since the outbreak of the war as part of the rotating presidency of the EU, he went to Russia on July 5 to negotiate with Vladimir Putin. The Russian trip provoked a lot of criticism, both from the EU and Ukrainian sides, emphasizing that Orbán had no EU or NATO authorization to conduct peace negotiations; Charles Michel, the president of the European Council, and Josep Borrell, the High Representative of the EU for Foreign Affairs and Security Policy, also drew attention to the isolation of European organizations. According to Kyiv, Orbán did not consult with them about the Russian path, and they also reminded that they could only make a decision about the peace plan for the war together with Ukraine, which insists on its territorial integrity, and this was also declared by Hungary. NATO Secretary General Jens Stoltenberg also indicated that Hungary also agreed with Ukraine's sovereignty in their agreements. Several Western leaders criticized Orbán's trip to Russia, adding that the negotiation with Putin was a personal decision of Orbán for which he had no federal authority. They also made it clear that Russia is the aggressor in the conflict, so if Orbán wanted to help, he should support Ukraine. It was even suggested that due to Orbán's trip to Moscow, the usual EU board visit to the current presidency of the EU should be missed, which would have been unprecedented. Shortly after the visits, Russian forces bombed a children's hospital in Kyiv, for which several European politicians sharply criticized Orbán, saying that he had achieved nothing with the Russians with his negotiations and speeches about peace. Ursula von der Leyen also criticized Orbán's trip to Moscow, which she said made no sense in light of the bombing.

== See also ==
- Belarusian involvement in the Russo-Ukrainian war
- Croatia and the Russo-Ukrainian war
- Slovak opposition to sanctions on Russia
