= 2024 Belgian Presidency of the Council of the European Union =

From January to June, second of a trio

Belgian Presidency of the Council of the European Union

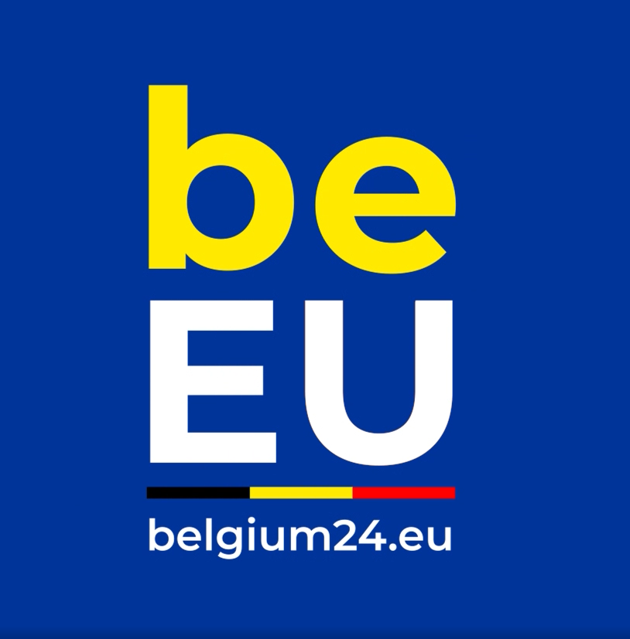
- Logo of the 2024 Belgian presidency 1 January – 30 June 2024
- Council of the European Union
- Website: belgium24.eu

Presidency trio
- Spain; Belgium; Hungary

Belgium held the presidency of the Council of the European Union during the first half of 2024. The presidency was the second of three presidencies making up a presidency trio, which began with the presidency of Spain, and was scheduled to be followed by that of Hungary. It was the 13th time Belgium had held the presidency. The motto that was chosen for the presidency was "Protect, Strengthen, Prepare".

== Overview ==
The Belgian presidency focused on six main areas of interest: (1) bolstering the union's work on society and its health, (2) following a proper green transition, (3) improving the union's economic competitiveness, (4) protecting democracy and the rule of law, (5) securing the union's people and its borders, and (6) strengthening the union's place in the world.

Both the 2024 Belgian federal election and the 2024 European Parliament election were held in early June, during the final month of Belgium's presidency. As the last plenary session of the European Parliament occurred in April, the presidency only had a few months to resolve more than 100 open issues before the elections dominated the agenda. The presidency concluded 74 legislative files in trilogue and advanced on about 60 more legislative files in the Council.
