= Oleh Kotenko =

Ukrainian public figure

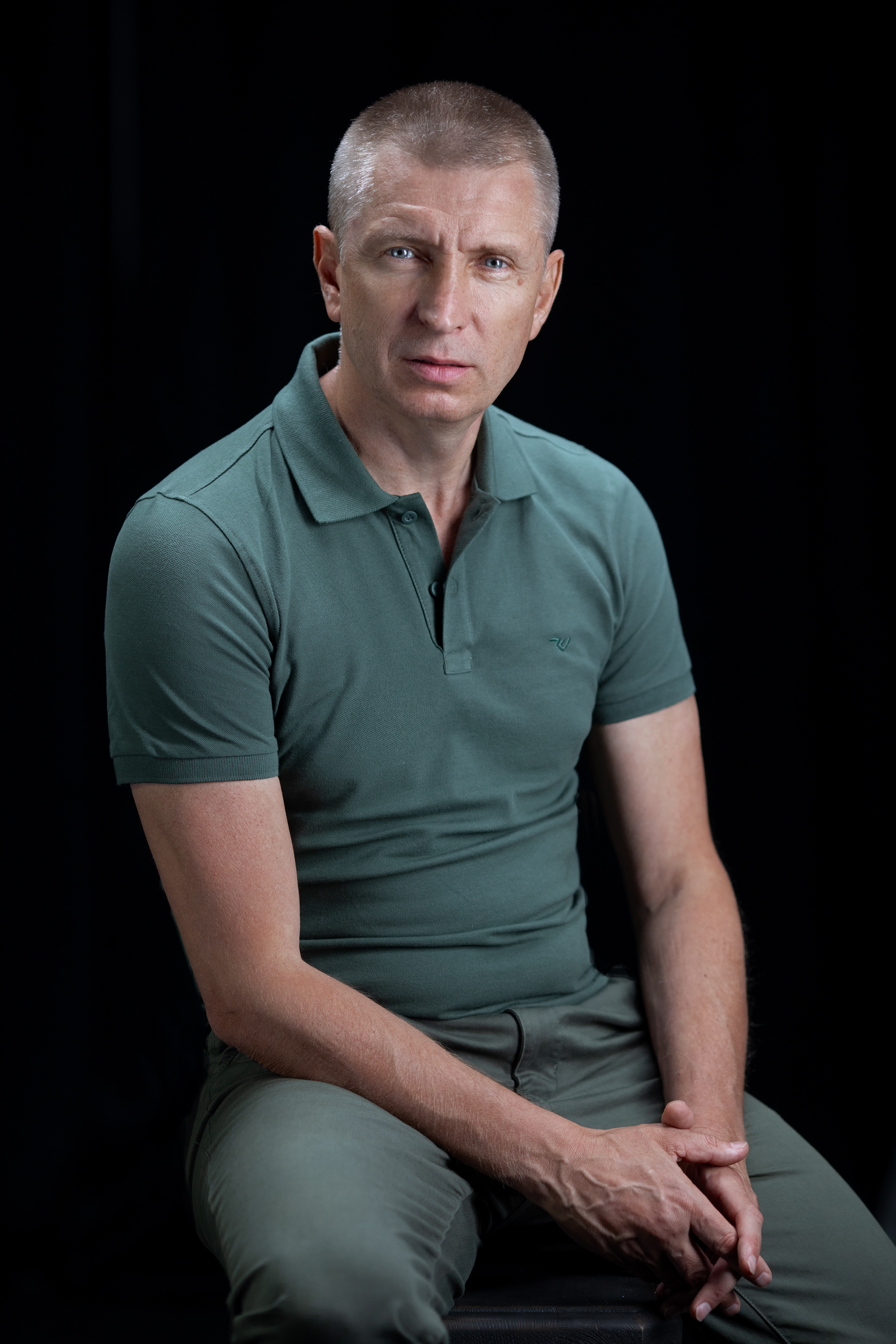
- Born: Oleh Oleksiyovych Kotenko; 24 December 1970 (age 55); Kramatorsk, Ukrainian SSR, USSR
- Known for: Head of the NGO "Patriot Group"

Oleh Kotenko (full name: Oleh Oleksiyovych Kotenko; Ukrainian: Оле́г Олексі́йович Коте́нко) is a Ukrainian public figure who was born on 24 December 1970 in Kramatorsk, Donetsk Oblast. He participated in the Revolution of Dignity and was involved in military activities between 2014 and 2017 as well as following the Russian invasion of Ukraine in 2022.

On 20 May 2022 Kotenko was appointed Commissioner for the Affairs of Persons Missing under Special Circumstances at the Ministry of Reintegration of Temporarily Occupied Territories.

== Education ==
Kotenko completed his secondary education in Kramatorsk in 1988.

In 2007 he graduated from the Donetsk National University of Economics and Trade where he specialised in international economics.

== Career ==
From 1995 to 2004 Kotenko served as vice president of CJSC Slavyane.

From 2007 to 2011 he was director of Liga Trade Ukraine, LLC.

From 2011 to 2014 he was a co-owner of Nano Comfort Technology, LLC.

From 2014 to 2015 he served as a spokesperson for the National Security and Defence Council.

== Awards and honours ==
Kotenko has received the following awards and honours:

- Medal: "For Assistance to the Armed Forces of Ukraine" from the Ministry of Defence, Ukraine
- Breast badge: "Sign of Honour" from the Ministry of Defence, Ukraine
- Medal: "Decorations of the President of Ukraine for Humanitarian Participation in the Anti-Terrorist Operation"
- Medal: "Joint Forces Operation: For Courage and Loyalty"
- Letter of thanks: from US Senator John McCain
- Order of Saint Nicholas the Wonderworker from the Orthodox Church of Ukraine
- Awards from the Armed Forces of Ukraine
- Awards from the Security Service of Ukraine

== Activities ==
From 2015 to 2022 Kotenko served as head of the NGO (non-governmental organisation) "Patriot Group" and was involved in the following activities:

- Searching for missing military personnel and civilians in the area of the Anti-Terrorist Operation (ATO) and in temporarily occupied territories;
- Facilitating the exchange and release of hostages in the area of the ATO and in temporarily occupied territories;
- Locating burial sites and the remains of deceased persons in temporarily occupied territories;
- Providing humanitarian assistance to Ukrainian military personnel along the line of demarcation, and supporting the rehabilitation of ATO veterans and their families;
- Providing health and psychological support to children from the ATO zone.

== Personal life ==
Kotenko is married to Alla Leonidivna Kotenko, a public figure and editor-in-chief of the publication Patriot Donbas. The couple have a son and a daughter.
