= 2023 Spanish Presidency of the Council of the European Union =

From July to December, first of a trio

Spanish Presidency of the Council of the European Union

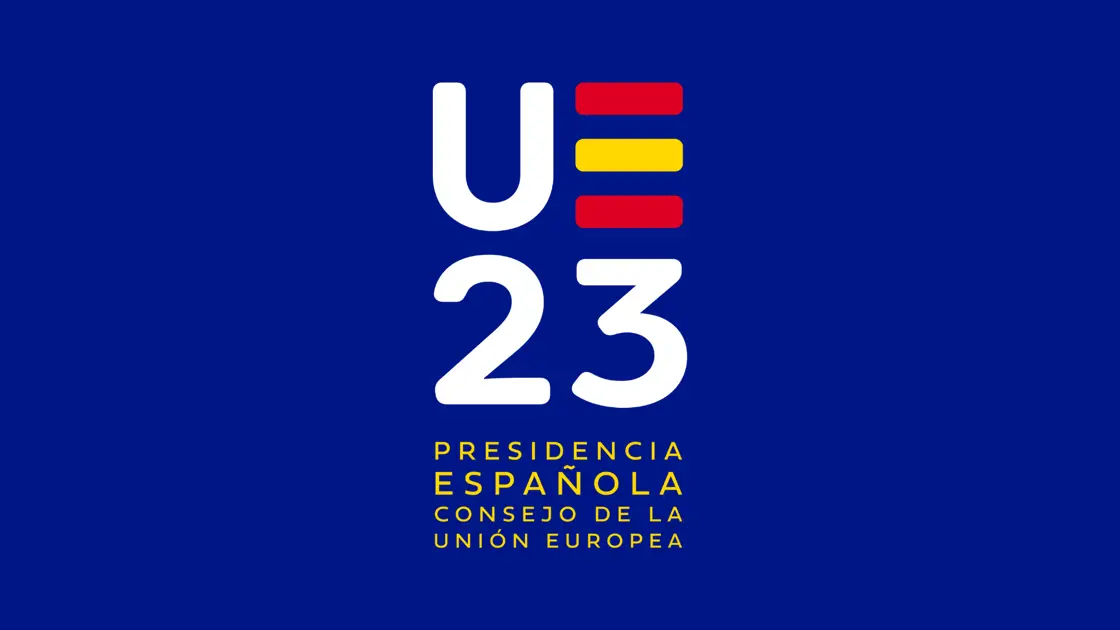
- Logo of the 2023 Spanish presidency 1 July – 31 December 2023
- Council of the European Union
- Website: https://spanish-presidency.consilium.europa.eu

Presidency trio
- Spain; Belgium; Hungary

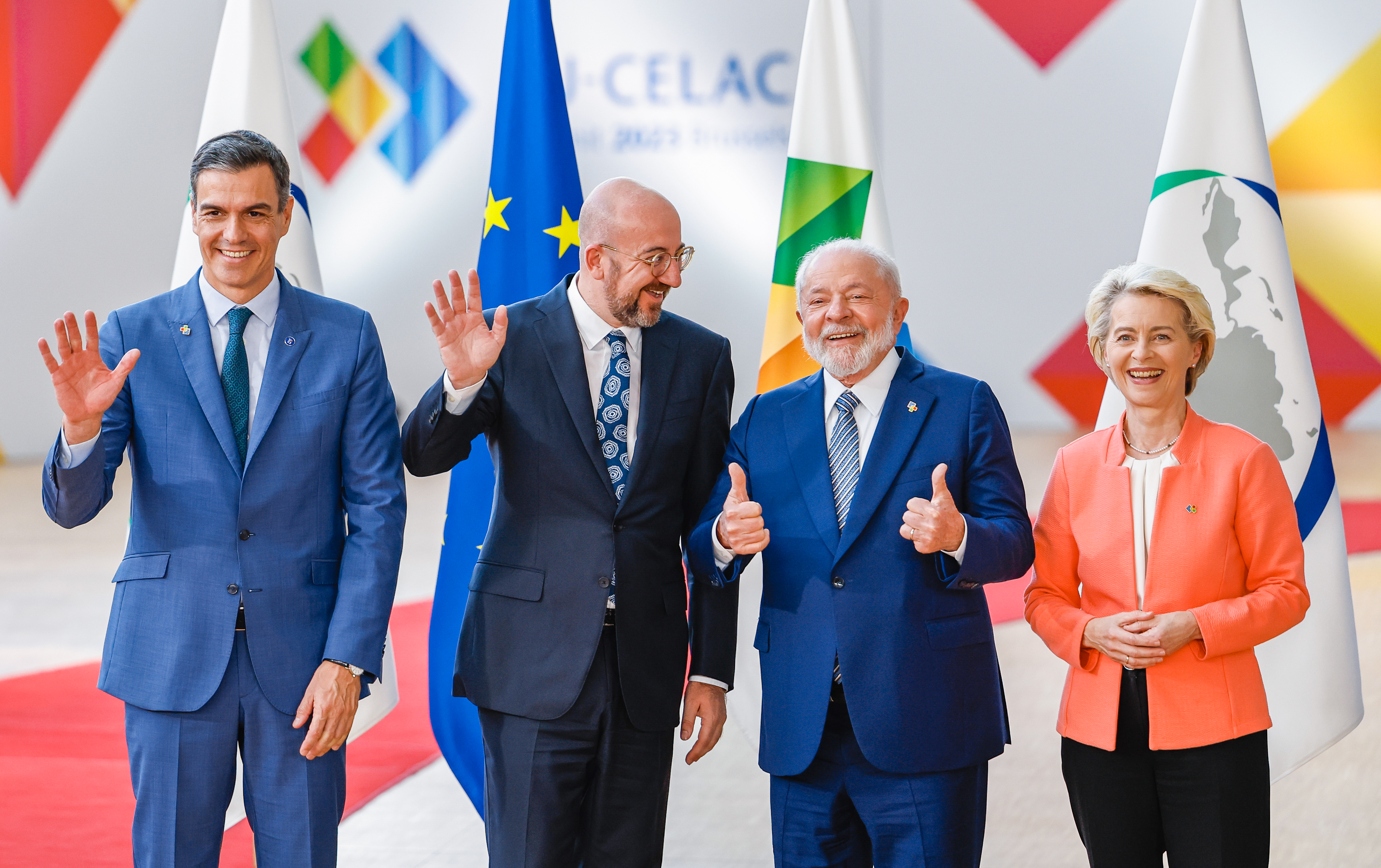
Spanish prime minister Pedro Sánchez (left), European Council president Charles Michel (center left), Brazilian president Luiz Inácio Lula da Silva (center right), and European Commission president Ursula von der Leyen (right) at the 3rd EU–CELAC summit in Brussels, 17 July 2023

Spain held the presidency of the Council of the European Union during the second half of 2023. The presidency was the first of three presidencies making up a presidency trio, followed by the presidency of Belgium, and scheduled to be followed by that of Hungary. It was the fifth time Spain had held the presidency.

On the first day of the presidency, Spanish prime minister Pedro Sánchez took the train to Kyiv in a highly symbolic visit, where he met with Ukrainian president Volodymyr Zelenskyy and addressed the Verkhovna Rada. (Note: Sánchez explicitly mentioned that he wanted the first act of the presidency to be in Ukraine. The Spanish government also stated that the visit symbolized "the European Union's unwavering support for Ukraine in all areas: military, humanitarian and economic".) During the visit, Sánchez stated that one of the priorities of the Spanish presidency would be working with Ukraine in its bid to accede to the European Union.

One of the greatest successes of this presidency is considered to be the historic breakthrough regarding the full integration of Bulgaria and Romania into the Schengen area and the initial opening of the air and sea borders of the two already Schengen countries with the other Schengen countries. Land borders are expected to be abolished in 2024.

== Meetings ==
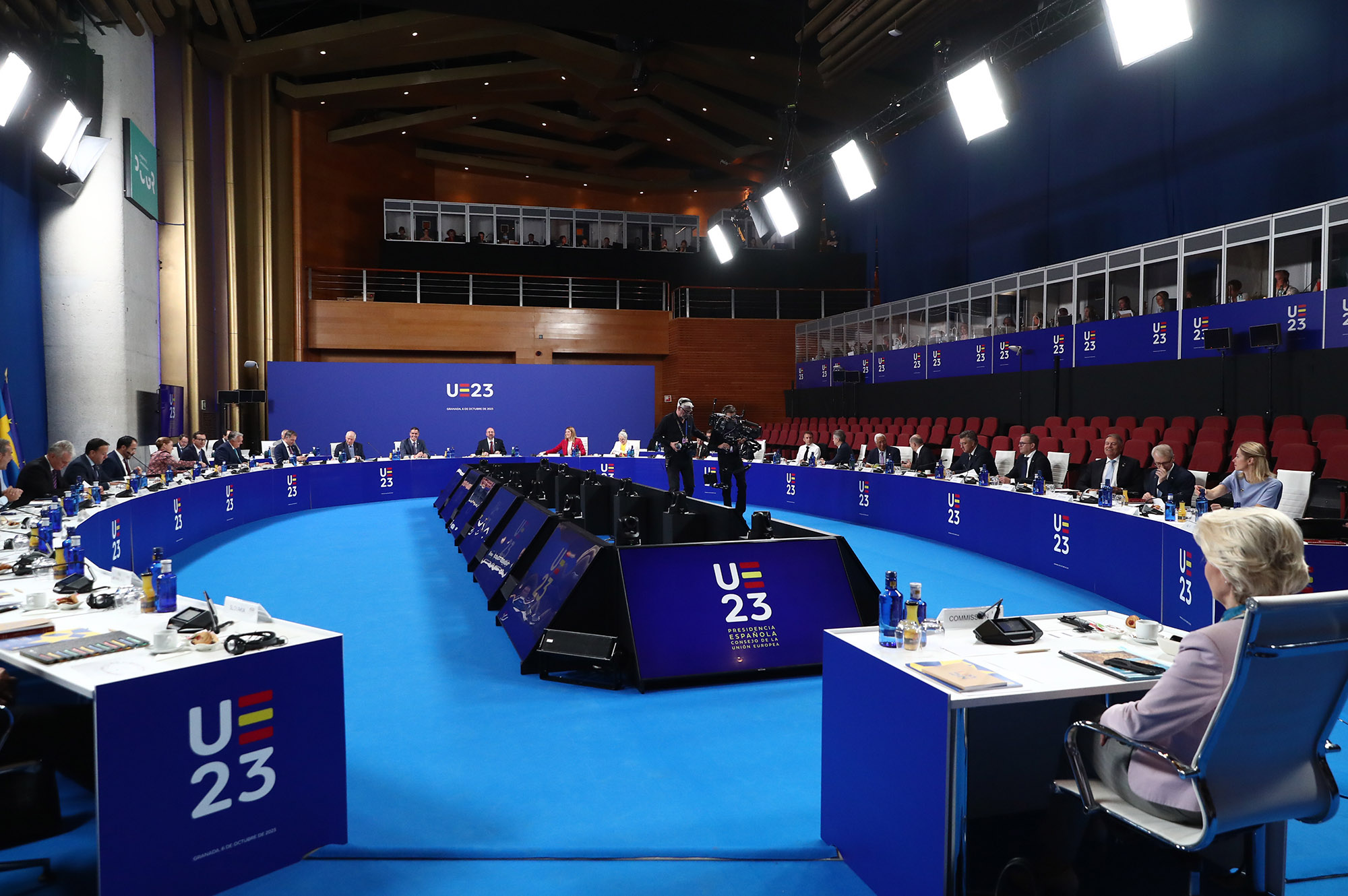
Informal meeting of the European Council. Granada, 6 October 2023.

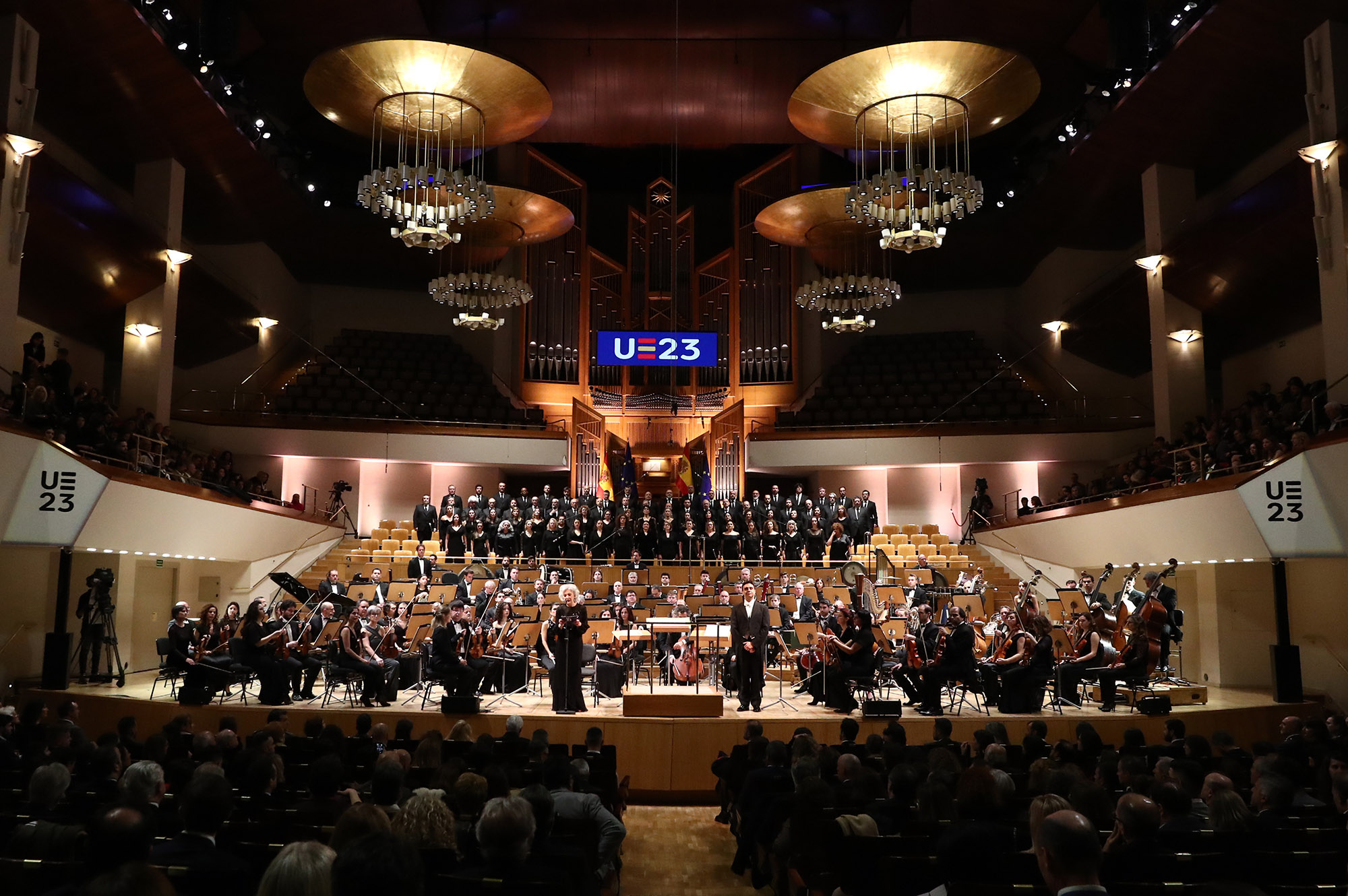
Closing concert of the 2023 Spanish Presidency.

The meeting of the College of Commissioners that traditionally inaugurates the rotating presidency took place at the Royal Collections Gallery in Madrid on 3 July 2023. The 3rd EU–CELAC summit took place in Brussels on 17–18 July. The 3rd European Political Community Summit between the members of the European Political Community took place in Granada on 5 October. An informal meeting of the European Council took place at the same venue in Granada the following day, on 6 October.

=== Informal ministerial meetings ===
Area	Date	Location	Ref.
Environment	10–11 July 2023	Valladolid	
Energy	11–12 July 2023	Valladolid	
Employment and social policies	13–14 July 2023	Madrid	
Fisheries	17–18 July 2023	Vigo	
Justice and home affairs	20–21 July 2023	Logroño	
Consumer affairs and industry and internal market	24–25 July 2023	Bilbao	
Health	28 July 2023	Las Palmas de Gran Canaria	
Competitiveness (Research)	28 July 2023	Santander	
Defence	30 August 2023	Toledo	
Foreign Affairs	31 August 2023	Toledo	
Agriculture	3–5 September 2023	Córdoba	
Development	4–5 September 2023	Cádiz	
Economic and financial affairs	15–16 September 2023	Santiago de Compostela	
Education and youth	18–19 September 2023	Zaragoza	
Transport	22 September 2023	Barcelona	
Culture	26 September 2023	Cáceres	
General Affairs	28 September 2023	Murcia	
General Affairs (cohesion)	29 September 2023	Murcia	
Foreign Affairs	10 October 2023	Videoconference	
Trade	20 October 2023	Valencia	
Telecommunications	23–24 October 2023	León	
Tourism	31 October 2023	Palma	
European Space Agency	7 November 2023	Seville	
Competitiveness (space)	7 November 2023	Seville	
Housing and urban development	13–14 November 2023	Gijón	
Equality	23–24 November 2023	Pamplona	
