= Igor Zhovkva =

Ukrainian politician

- Ігор Жовква
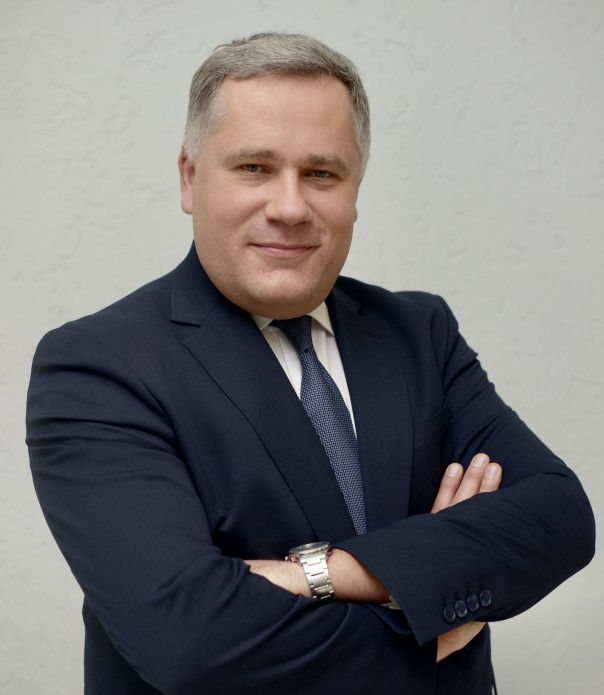
- Zhovkva in 2021

Deputy Head of the Office of the President of Ukraine
- Incumbent
- Assumed office 10 September 2019
- President: Volodymyr Zelenskyy

Personal details
- Born: 22 October 1979 (age 46) Kyiv, Ukrainian SSR, Soviet Union
- Occupation: politician, diplomat

Igor Ivanovych Zhovkva (Ukrainian: Ігор Іванович Жовква; born 22 October 1979) is a Ukrainian politician and diplomat. He has served as Deputy Head of the Office of the President of Ukraine since 2019.

== Early life ==
Zhovkva was born on 22 October 1979 in the city of Kyiv, which was then part of the Ukrainian SSR in the Soviet Union. After graduating from the University of Kyiv within the Institute of International Relations, he began working as an assistant to MP Borys Tarasyuk of Our Ukraine in 2002.

== Career ==
In December 2002, he left this position when he was appointed chief consultant to the Office of the President of Ukraine, and starting in 2006 he started holding senior positions within the Office of the President of Ukraine. In January 2008, he was appointed Head of the Service of the Deputy Prime Minister for European Integration. Then, in 2010, he was appointed Director of the Department of International Cooperation and Investment Marketing at the State Agency for Investment and National Projects.

In March 2014, he was appointed Deputy Head of the Service of the Deputy Prime Minister in the Secretariat of the Cabinent of Ministers. Since September 2014, he has been the head of the Main Department for Foreign Policy and European Integration of the Administration of the President of Ukraine. In 2025, after the Russian invasion of Ukraine, he explained that the vision of Ukraine in the future was to have a European peacekeeping mission, but opposed having "blue-helmet" observors, which he called symbolic, and instead preferring combat-ready troops that could serve as a deterrence for Russia in the future.

He is a member of the National Investment Council (since December 24, 2019).

Zhovkva is a member of the National Reform Council (since January 29, 2021).
