= Patriot Group =

Patriot Grpup
- Formation: July 26, 2014; 11 years ago
- Type: local organization public organization volunteer organization
- Headquarters: Boyarka, Kyiv region, 20, Bilohorodska Street,
- Website: https://grupa-patriot.org.ua/

The Patriot Group is a non-political public organization engaged in the search for missing, deceased Defenders of Ukraine, facilitating the exchange and release of prisoners due to Russian aggression against Ukraine.

Other activities:

- Searching for missing military personnel;
- Searching for bodies of the deceased, as well as graves in temporarily occupied territories;
- Integration of veterans into society;
- Providing humanitarian aid to Ukrainian military along the entire line of demarcation;
- Assisting defenders of Ukraine and their families;
- Organizing and conducting events for national-patriotic education with the aim of forming and affirming Ukrainian civic identity;
- Countering Russia's hybrid information aggression.

== History of Foundation ==
As a volunteer association, the "Patriot Group" emerged on 07.26.2014 in Sloviansk of Donetsk Oblast. In July, after the battles in the border areas of Donetsk and Luhansk oblasts, Ukrainian military had many dead and prisoners. Activist centurion of Maidan, Oleg Kotenko (call sign "Patriot"), was approached by acquaintances from Cherkasy regarding the search for missing compatriots. After constructive negotiations conducted by Oleg Kotenko, the soldiers were released. This marked the beginning of the public organization "Patriot Group".

The first feedback on the activities of the public organization was expressed by the governor of Cherkasy Oblast, Yuriy Tkachenko. For the exchange of prisoners near Slovyanserbsk and the evacuation of Ukrainian citizens, he awarded one of the members of the negotiation group "Patriot Group" with a badge.

== Release of Prisoners of War ==
In October 2014, negotiators of the "Patriot Group" participated in an exchange near the settlement of Smilyve. Initially, the exchange could not be carried out due to shelling from "grads". Therefore, the release of hostages took place the next day near the settlement of Donetsk. The release of hostages involved fighters of the special unit "Alfa" and a representative of the Unified Center for the Release of Hostages of the Security Service of Ukraine. As a result, 14 Ukrainian soldiers were released

On October 28, 2014, at a checkpoint near the city of Shchastia, Luhansk Oblast, hostages were released with the participation of negotiators of the "Patriot Group". As a result of negotiations, 7 Ukrainian soldiers of the 80th Airborne Brigade and 4 civilians were released. On November 18, activists participated in the release of 7 Ukrainian hostages.

On March 3, 2015, hostages were released – 4 soldiers of the 128th Brigade. The release was jointly conducted by the department for the Release of Prisoners of War at the Ministry of Defense of Ukraine and negotiators of the "Patriot Group".

On April 2, 2015, Vasyl Kozak, who had been held hostage since March 16, was released. The release was negotiated in the territory controlled by the "DPR". Oleg Khoroshykh – the head of the analytical department of the "Patriot Group" – participated in the release of the hostage. On April 4, 2015, the "Patriot Group" conducted successful negotiations for the release of the head of the State Farm Village Council of the Skadovsk district of Kherson Oblast, as well as two soldiers of the 93rd and 51st brigades.

On May 19, 2015, two soldiers of the National Guard of Ukraine were released from the self-proclaimed "DNR" captives: Ihor Panchyshyn from Lviv, and Mykola Valebny from the village of Mezhyrichchia, Sokal district, Lviv Oblast, who were taken hostage in Debaltseve on February 18, 2015.

On July 10, 2015, representatives of the "Patriot Group" participated in negotiations and the release of 9 soldiers and 1 volunteer. The release of hostages took place near the city of Shchastia.

== Other Activities ==
After the full-scale invasion of Russia into the territory of Ukraine on February 24, 2022, members of the public organization "Patriot Group" stood up to defend Ukraine and on the front lines. Among them, Andriy Shostak, Serhiy Kubrushko gave their lives defending the Motherland. In addition, the public organization "PATRIOT GROUP" is engaged in:

- facilitating the search for accomplices of Russian aggression;
- assistance to law enforcement agencies in detecting actions that threaten the security of citizens of Ukraine or the integrity and independence of Ukraine;
- coordination of cooperation between citizens and law enforcement agencies on issues of citizen security and protection of their violated rights due to Russian aggression;
- training of the civilian population in basics.

=== Integration of Veterans into Society ===
- providing qualified assistance to veterans in the regions, including in the fields of retraining education, psychological support and consultations regarding social guarantees;
- rehabilitation of released prisoners and providing psychological assistance to families of persons missing under special circumstances;
- providing consultations to veterans and their family members by specialists of the NGO "Patriot Group" call center.

=== Countering Russia's Hybrid Information Aggression ===
The newspaper "Patriot of Donbas" and the video channel of the NGO "Patriot Group" were created to inform about the most current events in Ukraine and the world. The information center of the mentioned information resources of the public organization closely monitors important news related to countering Russian aggression, key events taking place in the temporarily occupied territories of Ukraine.

=== Military Training ===
In 2024, the Training Center for Special Military Training of the public organization "Patriot Group" was established.

Military training is carried out comprehensively in the following areas:

- Military intelligence (tactics of small groups).
- Assault squads.
- Engineer and mine training.
- Fire training (handling weapons).
- Drone operators and FPV drones.
- Orientation in the terrain.
- Equipment and gear.
- Information resistance to the enemy.

Training is conducted free of charge with the involvement of the best military instructors, in compliance with the relevant safety standards, which in no way harm the life and health of participants.

== Links ==
- Official website
