= 2024 Hungarian Presidency of the Council of the European Union =

Hungarian Presidency of the Council of the European Union

- Logo of the 2024 Hungarian presidency 1 July – 31 December 2024
- Council of the European Union
- Term length: 1 July – 31 December 2024
- Website: hungary24.eu

Presidency trio
- Spain; Belgium; Hungary

The 2024 Hungarian Presidency of the Council of the European Union is the third in a trio of rotating Presidency of the Council of the European Union positions currently held by Hungary. Hungary's Presidency of the Council in 2024 is the final nation in the twelfth trio of Council Presidencies together with Spain and Belgium, which began on 1 July 2023 and lasted until the end of 2024. It is Hungary's second Presidency of the council, after its first in 2011.

Hungary succeeded Belgium as president on 1 July 2024. Poland assumed the presidency after Hungary on 1 January 2025.

== Objectives ==
The Hungarian Presidency stated on its presidency website that it would focus on the following priorities:

- Strengthening the external borders of the European Union and combating illegal immigration
- Addressing the demographic challenges of an aging population in Europe
- Promoting enlargement of the European Union to the Western Balkans
- Increasing the economic competitiveness of the European Union
- Shaping the future of the European Union's regional cohesion policy
- Promoting a "farmer-focused" European Union agricultural policy
- Strengthening the European Union's defense policy

== Visual identity ==
=== Logo ===
The Rubik's Cube, a famous Hungarian invention, is used in the presidency's logo as a symbol of ingenuity, creativity and strategic thinking.

=== Motto ===
The presidency used the motto "Make Europe Great Again", which has been criticised for its resemblance to the U.S. president Donald Trump's campaign slogan "Make America Great Again".

== Events ==
=== Unannounced "peace missions" to Kyiv, Moscow, and Beijing ===
On 2 July, Viktor Orbán visited Kyiv and asked Ukrainian President Volodymyr Zelenskyy to consider a ceasefire for the Russo-Ukrainian War, encouraging setting a deadline prior to the next Kyiv peace summit in order to accelerate peace talks.

On 5 July, Viktor Orbán made an unannounced visit to Russia and met with Russian President Vladimir Putin in order to discuss possible ceasefire proposals prior to creating peace terms. The meeting was strongly condemned by several European politicians, especially due to Putin referring to Orbán as "a representative of the European Council" rather than just as a representative to Hungary. Vice-President of the European Commission Josep Borrell responded by saying that Viktor Orbán "does not represent the EU in any way". President of the European Council Charles Michel said that "Russia is the aggressor, Ukraine is the victim, the rotating EU presidency has no mandate to engage in dialogue with Russia on behalf of the EU". NATO Secretary General Jens Stoltenberg stated that "Viktor Orbán does not represent NATO at these meetings, he represents his own country". The Ukrainian Ministry of Foreign Affairs strongly condemned Orbán's visit to Moscow for not coordinating or seeking permission for the visit with Ukraine beforehand.

Following his meeting with Putin, Orbán flew to Beijing on 8 July to meet Chinese President Xi Jinping, describing the trip as "Peace Mission 3.0" in a statement on Twitter.

Following the meetings, Germany, Poland, the Baltic states and other member states threatened to boycott EU meetings chaired by Hungary. The European Parliament delayed Orbán's speech to open the Hungarian presidency to as late as September, which parliament officials claimed was to "focus on nominees for the European Commission".

On 15 July 2024, the European Commission announced that several top European Union officials, including European Commission president Ursula von der Leyen, would boycott informal meetings held by Hungary as a result of the visits at the "start of the Hungarian (EU) presidency".

=== Cultural events ===
Klovićevi dvori Gallery in Zagreb and Hungarian National Museum in Budapest organised joint exhibition "Ideal and reality: first golden age of Hungarian painting and commencements of the Croatian Modern art" with exhibits of 19-century Croatian and Hungarian paintings.
