= 2022 in Europe =

Total number of people who received at least one dose of the COVID-19 vaccine in Europe on January 3, 2022

This is a list of events that took place in Europe in 2022.

== Incumbents ==
=== Albania ===
(Albania)

=== Andorra ===
(Andorra)

=== Azerbaijan ===
(Azerbaijan)

=== Belarus ===
(Belarus)

=== Belgium ===
(Belgium)

=== Bosnia and Herzegovina ===
(Bosnia and Herzegovina)

=== Bulgaria ===
(Bulgaria)

=== Croatia ===
(Croatia)

=== Czech Republic ===
(Czech Republic)

=== Cyprus ===
(Cyprus)

=== Denmark ===
(Denmark)

=== Estonia ===
(Estonia)

=== European Union ===
- President of the European Commission: Ursula von der Leyen
- President of the Parliament:
  - David Sassoli (until 11 January)
  - Roberta Metsola (from 18 January)
- President of the European Council: Charles Michel
- Presidency of the Council of the EU:
  - France (January–June)
  - Czech Republic (July–December)

=== Finland ===
(Finland)

=== France ===
(France)

=== Georgia ===
(Georgia (country))

=== Germany ===
(Germany)

=== Greece ===
(Greece)

=== Hungary ===
(Hungary)

=== Iceland ===
(Iceland)

=== Ireland ===
(Republic of Ireland)

=== Italy ===
(Italy)

=== Latvia ===
(Latvia)

=== Liechtenstein ===
(Liechtenstein)

=== Lithuania ===
(Lithuania)

=== Luxembourg ===
(Luxembourg)

=== Malta ===
(Malta)

=== Moldova ===
(Moldova)

=== Monaco ===
(Monaco)

=== Montenegro ===
(Montenegro)

=== Netherlands ===
(Netherlands)

=== North Macedonia ===
(North Macedonia)

=== Norway ===
(Norway)

=== Poland ===
(Poland)

=== Portugal ===
(Portugal)

=== Romania ===
(Romania)

=== Russia ===
(Russia)

=== San Marino ===
(San Marino)

=== Serbia ===
(Serbia)

=== Slovakia ===
(Slovakia)

=== Slovenia ===
(Slovenia)

=== Spain ===
(Spain)

=== Sweden ===
(Sweden)

=== Switzerland ===
(Switzerland)

=== Turkey ===
(Turkey)

=== Ukraine ===
(Ukraine)

=== United Kingdom ===
(United Kingdom)

=== Vatican City ===
(Vatican City)

== Events ==
=== January ===
- 10 January: Dutch Prime Minister Mark Rutte forms his fourth cabinet, almost a year after the collapse of his previous one.
- 16 January:
  - Dimitar Kovačevski was sworn in as Prime Minister of North Macedonia.
  - 2022 Serbian constitutional referendum, marked by a low turnout, leads to a revision of the provisions of the constitution concerning judicial power.
- 20 January: Austrian National Council votes 137–13 to approve a bill requiring people over 18 years to receive a COVID-19 vaccine beginning on 1 February, the first country in the European Union to do so.
- 25 January: The number of daily COVID-19 infections in 18 Western European countries were exceeds 1.5 million people, fueled by highly transmissible Deltacron hybrid variant, for the first time since the pandemic begin.
- 30 January: 2022 Portuguese legislative election took place.

=== February ===
- 4 February: 3 Scandinavian countries including Denmark, Norway, and Sweden were lifted all remaining COVID-19-related restrictions up, except for face mask rules due to the country's high vaccination rate.
- 11 February:
  - Finland and Iceland both joined 3 Scandinavian countries including Denmark, Norway, and Sweden were both also lifted all remaining COVID-19-related restrictions and measures up including face mask rules due to the country's high vaccination rate.
  - Biden's administration claimed that Russia now has enough troops and military equipment in place to launch an invasion of Ukraine.
- 21 February: Russia recognizes the independence of the Donetsk and Luhansk People's Republic.
- 24 February: Russia launches its invasion of Ukraine.
- 25 February:
  - U.K. and Ireland both remove all COVID-19 restrictions up, except for face mask rules due to both countries's high vaccination rate.
  - 3 Scandinavian countries including Denmark, Norway, and Sweden were prepare for transition to the living with COVID-19 endemic phase.
- 27 February: 2022 Belarusian constitutional referendum.
- 28 February: Ukraine applied for membership of the European Union (EU).

=== March ===
- 2 March: The United Nations General Assembly voted on a United Nations resolution condemning Russia for its invasion of Ukraine.
- 3 March: 2022 Armenian presidential election
- 7 March: World Health Organization has warned that COVID-19 Deltacron hybrid infection rate has another rising in 10 Western European countries including U.K., Ireland, France, Germany, Netherlands, and Italy, who fueled by the highly transmissible Omicron BA.2 subvariant, accounting for three-quarters of cases.
- 10 March: 2022 Hungarian presidential election
- 13 March: 75th British Academy Film Awards
- 16 March: The inauguration of the 1915 Çanakkale Bridge.
- 24 March: The number of daily COVID-19 cases in Germany exceeds 305,592 for the first time since the pandemic begin, fueled by highly transmissible Deltacron hybrid variant.
- 26 March: 2022 Maltese general election
- 28 March: COVID-19 Deltacron hybrid infection rate has now peaked in 10 Western European countries including U.K., Ireland, France, Germany, Netherlands, and Italy, lowest level since back in January 2022.
- 31 March: COVID-19 state of emergency in Italy has now officially ends as COVID-19 Deltacron hybrid infection rate declined.

=== April ===
- 3 April: 2022 Hungarian parliamentary election and 2022 Hungarian LGBTQ in education referendum
- Two days after the election, the European Commission president Ursula von der Leyen announced that the commission would begin cutting funding to Hungary over rule-of-law concerns.
- 8 April:
  - Russian invasion of Ukraine: Russia is condemned by world leaders following a missile attack on Kramatorsk train station, which kills 59 civilians trying to evacuate, including seven children.
  - Global food prices increase to their highest level since the UN's Food Price Index began in 1990, with commodities such as wheat rising by nearly 20% as a result of the Russian invasion of Ukraine.
  - U.K., Ireland, France, Germany, Netherlands, Italy, and among other European countries were declared the end of COVID-19 pandemic after the first two years of serious outbreak, for example: lifted all restrictions up and then prepare for transition to the endemic phase from Deltacron hybrid variant.
- 10 to 24 April: 2022 French presidential election took place.
- 14 April: Russian flagship Moskva becomes the largest warship to be sunk in action since World War II. Ukraine claims to have struck it with Neptune anti-ship missiles, while Russia claims it sank during stormy weather after an onboard fire.
- 18 April: The Battle of Donbas begins, leading to the deaths of several thousand military personnel and civilians.
- 20 April: A European Southern Observatory team announce the discovery of micronovae, a new type of exploding star.
- 24 April: 2022 Slovenian parliamentary election is held to elect all 90 members of the National Assembly of Slovenia, the lower house of Slovenian Parliament; the Freedom Movement party becomes the largest party, winning 41 of 90 seats.
- 27 April: The European Union accuses Russia of blackmail after gas supplies to Poland and Bulgaria are halted by energy giant Gazprom.
- 28 April: The Parliament of Montenegro elects a new government with Dritan Abazović as prime minister, following a motion of no confidence against the government of Zdravko Krivokapić.

=== May ===
- 6 May: Monkeypox outbreak begins when the first monkeypox virus case is reported in London, the United Kingdom.
- 10 to 14 May: Eurovision Song Contest 2022 is held in Turin, Italy. The contest is won by Ukrainian folk-rap group Kalush Orchestra with their song "Stefania".
- 12 May: An official death toll from COVID-19 and Deltacron hybrid variant in Europe were both exceeds 2 million people since the pandemic begin.
- 16 May: The Siege of Mariupol ends in a Russian victory as Ukrainian troops are evacuated from Mariupol.
- 18 May: Finland and Sweden applied for membership of the North Atlantic Treaty Organization (NATO).
- 28 May: Spanish club Real Madrid beat English club Liverpool 1–0 to win the UEFA Champions League final played at the Stade de France in Paris, France.

=== June ===
- 4 June: Retired general Bajram Begaj is elected the 9th President of Albania by the parliament in the 4th round of voting.
- 14 June: Canada and Denmark end their competing claims for Hans Island by dividing the island roughly in half, ending what was referred to as the Whisky War.
- 19 June: The second round of the 2022 legislative election is held in France, resulting in a hung parliament, with President Emmanuel Macron's coalition losing its majority in the National Assembly. A newly-formed coalition of left-wing parties, led by far-left Jean-Luc Mélenchon, makes significant gains. Marine Le Pen's far-right National Rally also makes historic gains, increasing its number of MPs tenfold and becoming the largest opposition party in Parliament. Two weeks later, Macron's government is reshuffled, continuing as a minority administration.
- 26 June: G7 leaders gather for a summit in Germany to discuss the situation in Ukraine. A ban on imports of Russian gold is announced
- 28 to 30 June: A NATO summit is held in Madrid, Spain along with the presence of guest countries from the European Union and the Indo-Pacific primarily searching for a consensual defensive reinforcement after the Russian invasion of Ukraine and the sustained threatening over the territorial integrity of other countries.

=== July ===
- 6 to 31 July: UEFA Women's Euro 2022 is held in England, with the hosts winning their first major tournament since 1966.
- 7 July:
  - After revelations over his appointment of Chris Pincher as Deputy Chief Whip triggered a series of resignations from his government, UK Prime Minister Boris Johnson announces his intention to resign, triggering the Conservative Party leadership election.
- 8 July: Many European leaders including Boris Johnson, Micheál Martin, Emmanuel Macron, Olaf Scholz, Mark Rutte, Mario Draghi, Pedro Sánchez, António Costa, Mette Frederiksen, Jonas Gahr Støre, Magdalena Andersson, Sanna Marin, and E.U. Commissioner President Ursula von der Leyen were reacts to the assassination of Shinzo Abe was "truly heartbreaking".
- 19 July: – At least 3,600 people are killed due to extreme heatwaves hitting much of Europe, additionally causing major wildfires, travel disruption, and record high temperatures in many countries.
- 21 July: The European Central Bank raises its key interest rate for the first time in more than 11 years, from minus 0.5 per cent to zero, with plans for further increases later in the year.
- 29 July: Spain and Portugal were both prepare for transition to the living with COVID-19 endemic phase after the first 30 months of serious outbreak.

=== August ===
- 10 August: Spanish club Real Madrid beat German club Eintracht Frankfurt 2–0 to win the 2022 UEFA Super Cup played at the Olympic Stadium in Helsinki, Finland.
- 17 August: Turkey and Israel agree to restore full diplomatic relations after a period of tensions.
- 19 August: Montenegro's coalition government of Montenegrin Prime Minister Dritan Abazović collapses after the 81-seat parliament passes a motion of no confidence in a vote of 50–1, following dispute within the coalition over an agreement the government signed with Serbian Orthodox Church.

=== September ===
- 2 September: The G7 economies agree to impose a price cap on Russian petroleum exports.
- 6 September: Liz Truss is appointed Prime Minister of the United Kingdom after winning the July–September 2022 Conservative Party leadership election.
- 8 September: Queen Elizabeth II of the United Kingdom and 14 other Commonwealth realms dies at Balmoral Castle in Scotland at the age of 96. Her son, Charles III, who succeeds her as King.
- 11 September: The 2022 Swedish general election is held to elect all 349 seats of the Riksdag. Prime Minister Magdalena Andersson resigns after her centre-left bloc narrowly loses to a bloc of right-wing parties, 176 seats to 173; Andersson is succeeded as prime minister by Ulf Kristersson in October.
- 12 September: Armenia–Azerbaijan clash crises: Azerbaijan attacks Armenian positions near the cities of Vardenis, Goris, Sotk, and Jermuk, and occupies certain areas of its territory along the Armenia–Azerbaijan border. Over the next few days, more than 100 Armenian soldiers are killed in the clashes, while Azerbaijan acknowledges 71 fatalities among its forces.
- 19 September: The state funeral of Elizabeth II is held in Westminster Abbey, London. Her coffin is then taken by procession to Windsor Castle for burial with her husband, parents and sister in the King George VI Memorial Chapel. The funeral is speculated to be the most watched television event in British and world history.
- 21 September: Following a major counteroffensive by Ukraine in the east of the country, Putin announces a partial mobilization of Russia and threatens nuclear retaliation, saying "this is not a bluff".
- 25 September: The 2022 Italian general election took place.
- 26 September: The Nord Stream pipeline sabotage occurs by an unknown perpetrator off the coast of Bornholm, Denmark with explosions on two pipelines leaving them inoperable.
- 27 September: Russian occupation authorities in Ukraine claim that their annexation referendums show an overwhelming support for the annexation by Russia of the Donetsk People's Republic, the Luhansk People's Republic, and parts of Kherson Oblast and Zaporizhzhia Oblast. However, the voting is widely dismissed as a sham referendum.
- 30 September: Russian President Vladimir Putin signs treaties absorbing the occupied regions of Donetsk, Luhansk, Kherson, and Zaporizhzhia into the Russian Federation. This annexation is seen as a breach of international law by the global community.

=== October ===
- 8 October: An explosion occurs on the Crimean Bridge connecting Crimea and Russia, killing three and causing a partial collapse of the only road bridge between the Crimean Peninsula and the Russian mainland. Two days later, retaliatory missile strikes are conducted by Russia across Ukraine, the most widespread since the start of the invasion, notably including attacks on Kyiv.
- 17 October: The European Commission announce EU cohesion funds (75 billion euros) for Poland would be frozen.
- 20 October: After 45 days in office, Liz Truss announced her resignation as leader of the Conservative Party and her intention to resign as prime minister of the United Kingdom.
- 25 October: Amid a government crisis, Rishi Sunak becomes Prime Minister of the United Kingdom, following the resignation of Liz Truss the previous week resulting in a 50-day tenure.
- 29 October: In response to an alleged Ukrainian drone attack against the Black Sea Fleet, Russia withdraw from a U.N.-brokered deal on the shipment of grain, which had brought down soaring global food prices.

=== November ===
- 1 November: The 2022 Danish general election took place.
- 11 November: Ukrainian Armed Forces recapture Kherson, the only regional capital to be taken by Russia since the start of war at 9 months ago.

=== December ===
- 2 December: The E.U. joined G7, Mexico, Australia, and New Zealand in imposing a cap of $60 a barrel on Russian crude oil, designed to "prevent Russia from profiting from its war of aggression against Ukraine."
- 17 December: Leo Varadkar succeeds Micheál Martin as Taoiseach (Prime Minister) of Ireland, as part of a rotation agreement made in 2020.
- 22 December - The European Commission says it would hold back all 22 billion euros of EU cohesion funds for Hungary until its government meets conditions related to judiciary independence, academic freedoms, LGBTQI rights and the asylum system.
- 31 December: Former Pope Benedict XVI dies aged 95.

== Deaths ==
January

- January 2 - Eric Walter Elst, Belgian astronomer (b. 1936)
- January 3 - Viktor Saneyev, Soviet and Georgian triple jumper (b. 1945)
- January 8 - Viktor Mazin, Russian weightlifter, Olympic champion (b. 1954)
- January 11
  - Anatoly Alyabyev, Soviet and Russian athlete and Olympic champion (b. 1951)
  - David Sassoli, Italian politician (b. 1956)
- January 13 - Jean-Jacques Beineix, French film director (b. 1946)
- January 14 - Ricardo Bofill, Spanish architect (b. 1939)
- January 18
  - Sir David Cox, English statistician (b. 1924)
  - Paco Gento, Spanish footballer and manager (b. 1933)
- January 19
  - Gaspard Ulliel, French actor (b. 1984)
  - Hardy Krüger, German actor (b. 1928)
  - Hans-Jürgen Dörner, German football player, and Olympic champion (b. 1951)
- January 20 - Heidi Biebl, German alpine skier and Olympic champion (b. 1941)
- January 23
  - Keto Losaberidze, Soviet and Georgian archer and Olympic champion (b. 1949)
  - Thierry Mugler, French fashion designer (b. 1948)
- January 24 - Szilveszter Csollány, Hungarian gymnast and Olympic champion (b. 1970)
- January 25 - Wim Jansen, Dutch footballer and manager (b. 1946)
- January 30 - Leonid Kuravlyov, Soviet and Russian actor (b. 1936)

== See also ==
- 2022 in the European Union
- 2022 in politics and government
- List of state leaders in Europe in 2022
