= 2018 in Europe =

This is a list of events that took place in Europe in 2018.

== Incumbents ==
=== Albania ===
(Albania)

=== Andorra ===
(Andorra)

=== Azerbaijan ===
(Azerbaijan)

=== Belarus ===
(Belarus)

=== Belgium ===
(Belgium)

=== Bosnia and Herzegovina ===
(Bosnia and Herzegovina)

=== Bulgaria ===
(Bulgaria)

=== Croatia ===
(Croatia)

=== Czech Republic ===
(Czech Republic)

=== Cyprus ===
(Cyprus)

=== Denmark ===
(Denmark)

=== Estonia ===
(Estonia)

=== European Union ===
- President of the European Commission: Jean-Claude Juncker
- President of the Parliament: Antonio Tajani
- President of the European Council: Donald Tusk
- Presidency of the Council of the EU:
  - Bulgaria (January–July)
  - Austria (July–December)

=== Finland ===
(Finland)

=== France ===
(France)

=== Germany ===
(Germany)

=== Georgia ===
(Georgia (country))

=== Greece ===
(Greece)

=== Hungary ===
(Hungary)

=== Iceland ===
(Iceland)

=== Ireland ===
(Republic of Ireland)

=== Italy ===
(Italy)

=== Latvia ===
(Latvia)

=== Liechtenstein ===
(Liechtenstein)

=== Lithuania ===
(Lithuania)

=== Luxembourg ===
(Luxembourg)

=== Malta ===
(Malta)

=== Moldova ===
(Moldova)

=== Monaco ===
(Monaco)

=== Montenegro ===
(Montenegro)

=== Netherlands ===
(Netherlands)

=== North Macedonia ===
(North Macedonia)

=== Norway ===
(Norway)

=== Poland ===
(Poland)

=== Portugal ===
(Portugal)

=== Romania ===
(Romania)

=== Russia ===
(Russia)

=== San Marino ===
(San Marino)

=== Serbia ===
(Serbia)

=== Slovakia ===
(Slovakia)

=== Slovenia ===
(Slovenia)

=== Spain ===
(Spain)

=== Sweden ===
(Sweden)

=== Switzerland ===
(Switzerland)

=== Turkey ===
(Turkey)

=== Ukraine ===
(Ukraine)

=== United Kingdom ===
(United Kingdom)

=== Vatican City ===
(Vatican City)

== Events ==
=== January ===
- January 1 – Bulgaria assumed the Presidency of the Council of the European Union from Estonia.
- January 9 – The Church of St. Lambertus in Immerath, Germany is demolished.
- January 15 – Romanian Prime Minister Mihai Tudose resigns after his Social Democratic Party leaders lost their support.
- January 28 – Presidential elections were held in Finland.

=== February ===
- February 9 to 25 – Albania participated at the 2018 Winter Olympics in PyeongChang, South Korea.
- February 12 – Niklasdorf train collision took place in Austria, resulting in 1 death and 22 injuries.
- February 21 – Ján Kuciak was murdered in Slovakia.

=== March ===
- March 8 – The 2018 Spanish women's strike occurred in Spain.
- March 13 – Russian exile Nikolai Glushkov is found dead at his home in London, United Kingdom.

=== April ===
- April 11 – Ilham Aliyev wins the 2018 presidential elections in Azerbaijan.
- April 21 – Sweden hosted the 2018 World Mixed Doubles Curling Championship.
- April 28 – Switzerland won the 2018 World Mixed Doubles Curling Championship.

=== May ===
- May 4 – Beginning of the 2018 Giro d'Italia.
- May 12 – 2018 Paris knife attack occurred in Paris, France.
- May 26 – The Icelandic municipal elections took place.
- May 27 – End of the 2018 Giro d'Italia.
- May 28 – Kremlin warns that the United States put military pressure in the European Union security at risk.
- May 31 – Denmark bans the full Islamic face veil in public. Becoming the latest European country to ban it.

=== June ===
- June 1 – The Met Office confirms that May 2018 was the warmest May since 1910 in the UK and was also likely to be the sunniest since 1929.
- June 10 – Human Chain for Basque Self-determination, 2018 took place in Spain.
- June 24 – Recep Tayyip Erdoğan wins the 2018 presidential elections in Turkey.
- June 27 – The British Medical Association (BMA) voted to oppose Brexit "as a whole".

=== July ===
- July 1 – Austria assumed the Presidency of the Council of the European Union from Bulgaria.

=== September ===
- September 10 to 30 – The 2018 FIVB Volleyball Men's World Championship will be co-hosted in Bulgaria and Italy.

=== October ===
- October 7 – The 2018 Bosnian general election is scheduled to take place.

== Deaths ==
| Date of Death | Year of Birth | Location of Birth | Role(s), Action(s), or Achievement(s) | Person |
|---|---|---|---|---|
| 10)January 1 | 1932 | Austria | Classical guitarist | Konrad Ragossnig |
| 11)January 15 | 1941 | Bulgaria | Actress | Mariana Alamancheva |
| 12)February 22 | 1991 | Hungary | Footballer | Bence Lázár |
| 13)February 27 | 1936 | United Kingdom | Shoemaker | Lance Clark |
| 14)February 28 | 1932 | France | Historian | Pierre Milza |
| 15)March 4 | 1926 | Ireland | Actress | Carmel McSharry |
| 16)March 18 | 1943 | Slovakia | Politician | Michal Horský |
| 17)April 23 | 1926 | Albania | Politician and resistance member during World War II | Liri Belishova |
| 18)May 11 | 1904 | United Kingdom | Oldest verified person in the UK | Bessie Camm |
| 19)May 16 | 1958 | Luxembourg | Politician | Camille Gira |
| 20)May 17 | 1914 | Poland | Actor | Maciej Maciejewski |
| 21)May 31 | 1972 | Germany | Musician | Demba Nabé |
| 22)June 8 | 1968 | Germany | Footballer | Jutta Nardenbach |
| 23)June 23 | 1991 | Kosovo | Basketball player | Gazmend Sinani |
| 24)June 26 | 1947 | Slovakia | Rock and jazz bassist | Fedor Frešo |
| 25)July 1 | 1929 | Netherlands | Artist | Armando |

== See also ==
- 2018 in the European Union
- List of state leaders in 2018 § Europe
