= Czech Presidency of the EU =

Czech Presidency of the EU may refer to:

- the 2009 Czech Presidency of the Council of the European Union
- the 2022 Czech Presidency of the Council of the European Union
