= Sofia Philharmonic Orchestra =

Bulgarian national symphony orchestra, founded 1892

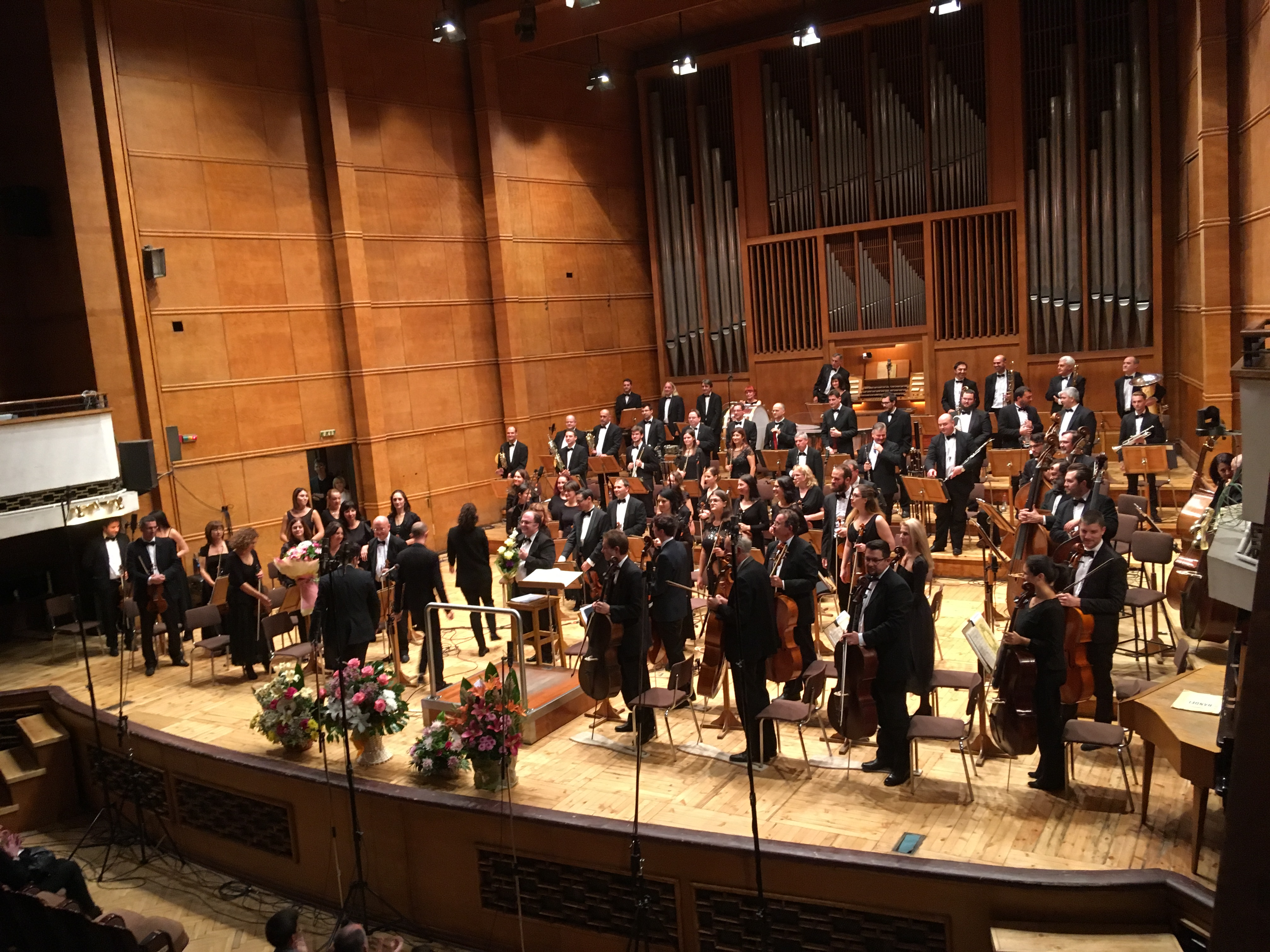
- Concert Hall "Bulgaria", home of the Sofia Philharmonic Orchestra

Background information
- Origin: Sofia, Bulgaria
- Genre: Classical music
- Years active: 1893–present
- Website: sofiaphilharmonic.com

The Sofia Philharmonic Orchestra is the national symphony orchestra of Bulgaria and one of the leading musical institutions of Southeastern Europe. Founded in 1893, it has established itself as the principal representative of Bulgarian musical culture and an active presence on the international concert stage. Its home is Concert Complex "Bulgaria" in Sofia, which includes the Great Concert Hall "Bulgaria", a chamber music hall, Studio "Music", and Art Gallery "Bulgaria".

The Sofia Philharmonic encompasses the National Philharmonic Orchestra, the National Philharmonic Choir "Svetoslav Obretenov", the "Sofia" and "Quarto" string quartets, and the vocal ensembles Bella Voce and Impresia.

== History ==
=== Foundation (1893–1944) ===
The Sofia Philharmonic traces its origins to the Royal Orchestra founded in 1893 by the Czech kapellmeister Josef Hochola, following the establishment of the modern Bulgarian state. In 1938, after a merger with the Academic Symphony Orchestra, the ensemble became the Royal Military Symphony Orchestra.

=== National Philharmonic Orchestra (1945–present) ===
In 1945 the ensemble was reconstituted as the National Philharmonic Orchestra, the national orchestra of Bulgaria. Since then the institution has developed as the country's foremost symphonic body, expanding its scope to encompass choral, chamber, and educational activities.

The artistic history of the Sofia Philharmonic is associated with a succession of distinguished conductors, including Sasha Popov, Konstantin Iliev, Dobrin Petkov, Vassil Stefanov, Vladi Simeonov, Vassil Kazandjiev, Dimitar Manolov, Emil Tabakov, Julian Kovatchev, and Nayden Todorov, who has served as its Artistic Director since 2017.

== Artistic directors and principal conductors ==
Conductors who have held leading positions with the orchestra include Sasha Popov, Konstantin Iliev, Dobrin Petkov, Vassil Stefanov, Vladi Simeonov, Vassil Kazandjiev, Dimitar Manolov, Emil Tabakov, Julian Kovatchev, and Nayden Todorov (2017–present). Todorov made his debut with the orchestra in 2001, served as permanent guest conductor from 2004, and was elected Artistic Director in 2017, a position to which he was re-elected in October 2022.

== Guest conductors ==
Among the conductors who have appeared with the Sofia Philharmonic are Bruno Walter, Hermann Abendroth, Kurt Masur, Gennady Rozhdestvensky, Valery Gergiev, Yuri Simonov, Yuri Temirkanov, Igor Markevich, Carlo Zecchi, Karl Österreicher, Karlheinz Stockhausen, Christoph Eschenbach, Sir Neville Marriner, Charles Dutoit, Marin Alsop, Kirill Petrenko, Frédéric Chaslin, and Gianluigi Gelmetti.

== Soloists ==
Among the soloists who have performed with the Sofia Philharmonic are David Oistrakh, Sviatoslav Richter, Emil Gilels, Alexis Weissenberg, Dmitri Shostakovich, Mstislav Rostropovich, Vladimir Spivakov, Ruggiero Ricci, Ghena Dimitrova, José Carreras, Julian Rachlin, Plácido Domingo, Sarah Chang, Thomas Hampson, Yuri Bashmet, Tabea Zimmermann, Elena Bashkirova, Sonya Yoncheva, Krassimira Stoyanova, Patricia Kopatchinskaja, Maxim Vengerov, Angela Gheorghiu, Vadim Repin, Paul Badura-Skoda, Joshua Bell, Elīna Garanča, Sharon Kam, Ivo Pogorelić, Martha Argerich, Viktoria Mullova, Mischa Maisky, Shlomo Mintz, Gidon Kremer, Ray Chen, Gautier Capuçon, Emmanuel Pahud, Augustin Hadelich, Diana Damrau, Bryn Terfel, Anna Netrebko, Midori, and Alexandrina Pendachanska.

== Repertoire ==
The repertoire of the Sofia Philharmonic spans the full historical range of Western art music, including regular premieres of works by Bulgarian composers. The orchestra places particular emphasis on Bulgarian symphonic music, including works by Pancho Vladigerov, Petko Staynov, Vesselin Stoyanov and Petar Hadjiev, alongside the standard international symphonic canon. In December 2019, Gramophone noted that the orchestra had "engendered a broader, bolder repertoire in its concerts" and had attracted "a new calibre of soloist and guest conductor."

== International activity ==
The Sofia Philharmonic has performed in Austria, Belgium, France, Germany, Greece, Italy, Spain, Luxembourg, the Netherlands, Poland, Portugal, Romania, Russia, Slovenia, Turkey, Croatia, Switzerland, the United Kingdom, China, South Korea, Singapore, Taiwan, Japan, Egypt, and North America.

Notable international appearances have included the UNESCO Headquarters in Paris (2008), the Palais des Beaux-Arts (BOZAR) in Brussels (January 2018, inaugural concert of the 2018 Bulgarian Presidency of the Council of the European Union, with soprano Sonya Yoncheva), the Musikverein Vienna Golden Hall (2019, 2022, and March 2025), the Konzerthaus Wien (2022), the Berliner Philharmonie (December 2022 and April 2026), the Romanian Athenaeum in Bucharest (2023 and 2024, the latter marking the orchestra's return after an 82-year absence), and the Main Hall of the Concertgebouw in Amsterdam (2024), presented by Sinfonia Rotterdam.

In 2019, the orchestra undertook a major tour of China performing Star Wars in Concert, organised by Disney.

== Recordings and broadcasts ==
The Sofia Philharmonic has recorded for labels including Capriccio, Timpani & Red Bus Classical, Naxos, Balkanton.

The orchestra's December 2022 concert at the Berliner Philharmonie — featuring works by Pancho Vladigerov and Mendelssohn, with pianist Ludmil Angelov — was filmed and distributed internationally by medici.tv.

In October 2025, the orchestra served as the orchestra for the final gala of the 32nd edition of Operalia, The World Opera Competition, held at Concert Hall "Bulgaria" in Sofia. The final was co-conducted by Artistic Director Nayden Todorov and Operalia founder Plácido Domingo, and was broadcast live worldwide on medici.tv. The competition was co-organised with soprano Sonya Yoncheva's production company SY11 Events. The winners were Georgian mezzo-soprano Ekaterine Buachidze and Romanian baritone Mihai Damian.

== Awards ==
The Sofia Philharmonic Orchestra has received numerous distinctions, including "Musician of the Year", "Golden Lyre", "Golden Stave", "Golden Quill", "Crystal Lyre", the Honorary Sign of the Municipality of Sofia, and the Honorary Sign of the President of the Republic of Bulgaria.
