= 2018 EU–Turkey summit =

2018 European Union–Turkey summit meeting in Varna, Bulgaria

The 2018 EU–Turkey summit was held on 26 March 2018 in Varna, Bulgaria. The summit took place at the Euxinograd Palace in Varna. The summit also took place during Bulgaria's EU presidency. Bulgarian prime minister Boyko Borisov hosted the event, while Turkish president Recep Tayyip Erdoğan, The president of the European Council Donald Tusk, and the president of the European Commission Jean-Claude Juncker, along with other Turkish and EU officials, also attended. The summit addressed numerous issues including EU-Turkey relations, Turkey's membership process, the migration agreement, Syria, and the Eastern Mediterranean.

== Background ==
Following the European Council summit of 22–23 March 2018, and prior to the summit in Varna, the council strongly condemned Turkey's illegal actions in the Eastern Mediterranean and the Aegean Sea, while EU leaders called on Turkey to cease these actions and respect Cyprus's sovereign rights to explore and exploit its natural resources in accordance with EU and international law. They also reminded Turkey of its obligation to respect international law and good neighborly relations, and to normalize relations with all EU member states, including Greece and Cyprus. While Bulgarian prime minister Borisov stated that Bulgaria was doing its best to improve EU-Turkey relations, EU Council President Tusk and Commission President Juncker called on Turkey to formally improve its relations with EU member states, Greece, and Cyprus in order to advance Turkey's membership process. Tusk strongly opposed Turkey's operation in Syria, while Turkish president Erdoğan stated that EU member states fully supported Turkey's fight against the PKK and YPG, which Turkey considers terrorist organizations, and once again called on the EU to support Turkey's fight against terrorism. Erdoğan also appealed to the EU for visa liberalization at the summit. The EU and Turkey agreed at the end of the summit to establish mutual contact and formally normalize their relations. On 26 March 2018, President of the European Council Donald Tusk stated in Varna, following the EU-Turkey summit, that no concrete solutions or agreements had been reached on the points of concern during the recent summit between EU leaders and Turkey. In his statement at the EU-Turkey summit in Varna, Turkish president Recep Tayyip Erdoğan expressed hope that the difficult period in relations between Turkey and the European Union was now behind them. Erdoğan also called on the EU to restart the accession process as soon as possible, to provide support to Turkey in its fight against terrorism, to accelerate the visa liberalization process, and to update the EU-Turkey Customs Union without delay.

== Links ==
- EU-Turkey leaders' meeting in Varna (Bulgaria), 26 March 2018, EU Council website
- Turkey: Summit relaunches open and constructive dialogue, EEAS website
