= Domingo Hindoyan =

Venezuelan conductor (born 1980)

- Born: February 15, 1980 (age 46); Caracas, Venezuela
- Occupation: Conductor
- Instrument: Violin

Domingo Garcia Hindoyan (born in Caracas, 15 February 1980) is a Venezuelan conductor and violinist.

== Biography ==
Hindoyan is the son of Domingo Garcia, a Venezuelan violinist and former president of the Orquesta Sinfonica Venezuela, and Viki Hindoyan, a lawyer at the Venezuelan National Parliament. Hindoyan is of Armenian descent through his mother, who was born in Aleppo, Syria. He began his music studies as a violinist and member of the Venezuelan musical education program El Sistema. He obtained a master's degree in conducting at the Haute Ecole de Musique de Genève with highest distinction with Laurent Gay. In 2012, he was invited to join the Allianz International Conductor’s Academy, where he worked with the London Philharmonic Orchestra and The Philharmonia Orchestra, under conductors Esa-Pekka Salonen and Sir Andrew Davis. He has participated in masterclasses with Bernard Haitink, David Zinman and Jesus Lopez Cobos.

In 2013, Hindoyan was appointed as first assistant conductor to Daniel Barenboim at the Deutsche Staatsoper Berlin. He made his Metropolitan Opera conducting debut in January 2018. Other debuts during the 2017–2018 season included appearances at the Oper Stuttgart, with Giacomo Puccini's Tosca, and at the Monte-Carlo Opera, with Vincenzo Bellini's I puritani.

In June 2019, Hindoyan first guest-conducted the Royal Liverpool Philharmonic (RLPO). He became principal guest conductor of the Polish National Radio Symphony Orchestra in September 2019. In June 2020, the RLPO announced the appointment of Hindoyan as its next chief conductor, with effect from the 2021–2022 season. This appointment marks his first chief conductor post. With the RLPO, Hindoyan made his conducting debut at The Proms in September 2021. In July 2023, the RLPO announced the extension of Hindoyan's contract as chief conductor through July 2028.

In November 2024, Hindoyan first guest-conducted at Los Angeles Opera (LA Opera) in a production of Gounod's Roméo et Juliette. In May 2025, LA Opera announced the appointment of Hindoyan as its music director, effective 1 July 2026, with an initial contract of five years.

== Personal life ==
Hindoyan is married to the soprano Sonya Yoncheva. The couple have two children, a son, Mateo, born in October 2014, and a daughter, Sophia, born in October 2019. The family resides in canton Vaud, Switzerland.
