= 2020 German Presidency of the Council of the European Union =

From July to December, first of a trio

German Presidency of the Council of the European Union

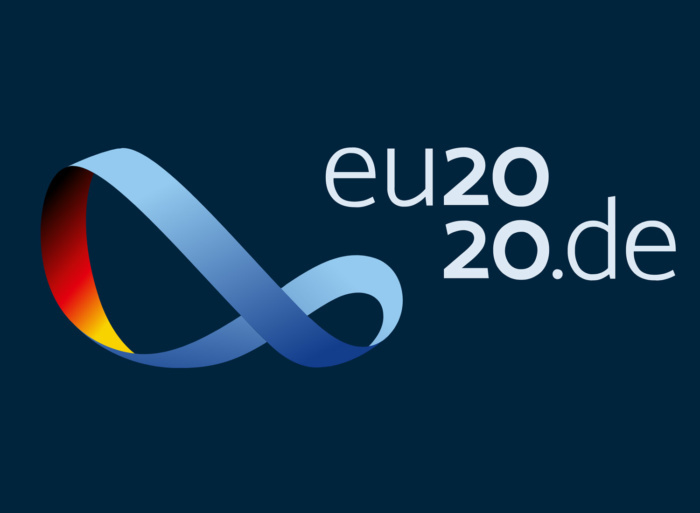
- Logo of the 2020 German presidency 1 July – 31 December 2020
- Council of the European Union
- Website: https://www.eu2020.de

Presidency trio
- Germany; Portugal; Slovenia

Germany held the presidency of the Council of the European Union during the second half of 2020. The presidency was the first of three presidencies making up a presidency trio, followed by the presidency of Portugal and that of Slovenia.

The German presidency occurred during the coronavirus pandemic. It came near the end of longtime German chancellor Angela Merkel's time in office; Merkel had also held the chancellorship during Germany's previous presidency of the council, in 2007.

== Overview ==
The pandemic shifted the goals of the presidency, and Merkel opened the term with a desire to establish a coronavirus fund to weather the economic impact of the pandemic. Initially agreed to in July, the Next Generation EU fund, consisting of 750 billion EUR in grants and loans, was held up when Poland and Hungary vetoed the European Union's proposed seven-year budget, as they both opposed how the distribution of funds was conditional upon respecting the rule of law. The budget was eventually passed in December, after the other member states agreed to delay the implementation of the rule-of-law mechanism.

At the end of the term, Politico Europe gave the German presidency a grade of B+, praising how the presidency addressed health care, but finding it lacking in the areas of transport and migration. Deutsche Welle's review of the presidency was also mixed, highlighting the response to the pandemic and progress on environmental issues, but noting that some goals that had originally been set by the presidency had been left untackled.

== Gallery ==
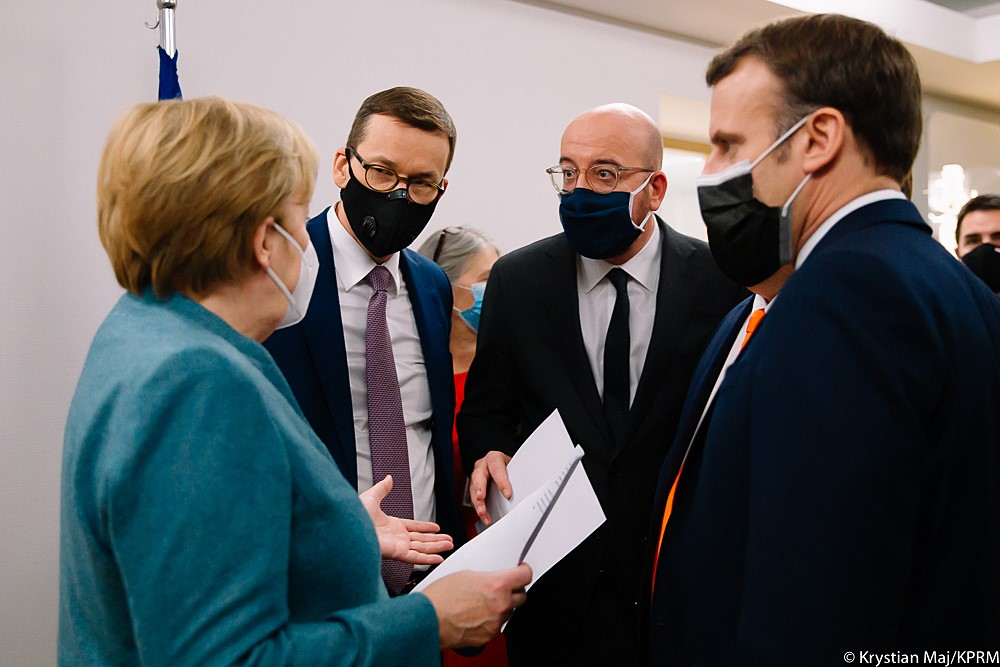
German chancellor Angela Merkel (left foreground), Polish prime minister Mateusz Morawiecki (center-left foreground), European Council president (Note: The presidency of the European Council should not be confused with the presidency of the Council of the European Union.) Charles Michel (center-right foreground), and French president Emmanuel Macron (right foreground), amidst a discussion in Brussels during a European Union summit, 10 December 2020

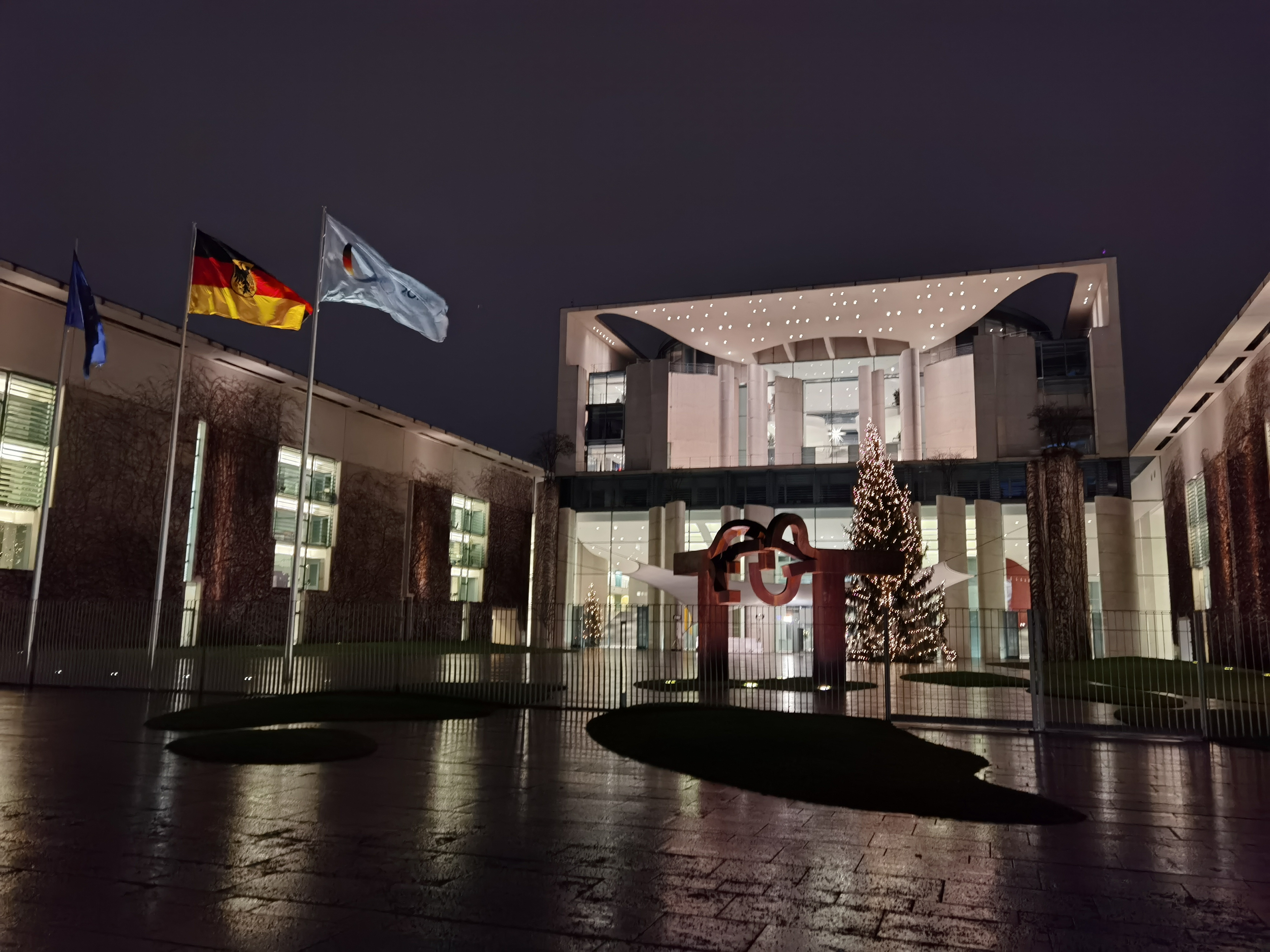
The Federal Chancellery in Berlin during the presidency, with a flag featuring the logo of the council presidency flying in front of the building, next to a flag of Germany and one of Europe

== See also ==
- Rule of Law Conditionality Regulation
