= 2022 French Presidency of the Council of the European Union =

From January to June, first of a trio

French Presidency of the Council of the European Union

- Logo of the 2022 French presidency 1 January – 30 June 2022
- Council of the European Union
- Website: https://presidence-francaise.consilium.europa.eu

Presidency trio
- France; Czech Republic; Sweden

France held the presidency of the Council of the European Union during the first half of 2022. The presidency was the first of three presidencies making up a presidency trio, followed by the presidency of the Czech Republic and that of Sweden.

The initial plans for the presidency included addressing the following areas: (1) civic engagement by youths, (2) defence and security, (3) environmental concerns, (4) migration reform, (5) reevaluation of the economy, (6) relations with Africa, and (7) regulation of online services.

Russia initiated its full-scale invasion of Ukraine two months into the French presidency. Two weeks later, the Versailles declaration was made in response, in which leaders of the European Union outlined plans to increase the union's energy security, boost its military defences, and build a stronger economy together. The declaration also reaffirmed the union's support of Ukraine. The French presidency of the Council of the European Union achieved several significant outcomes during its term. It facilitated the approval of the European Climate Law package, including the Carbon Border Adjustment Mechanism, to cut emissions by 55% by 2030. The presidency championed the Strategic Compass, a new defence framework for the EU to enhance collective security and define shared strategic interests. On the economic front, the presidency secured a reciprocity instrument for public procurement and measures against foreign subsidies distorting competition. The presidency launched the European Political Community to engage broader European countries in political dialogue and cooperation, beyond EU membership.

Georgina Wright of Institut Montaigne commented that the presidency was generally considered a success, though some criticized the ambitions of the presidency, and others found issue with statements that French president Emmanuel Macron made regarding the Russian invasion.

== Background ==
Per European institutional rules, France is assuming the rotating presidency of the Council of the European Union for six months for the thirteenth time. France is therefore preparing to take the helm of the Council of the European Union in a context marked by the end of the coronavirus crisis and an economic slowdown. On the domestic front, the visit of US Vice President Kamala Harris to the Élysée Palace aims to ease bilateral relations, which have been greatly affected by the scandal surrounding the Australian submarines. France is seeking to distance itself from its Anglo-Saxon partners and signed the Quirinal Treaty, a highly symbolic treaty of friendship and cooperation, with Italy on 26 November 2021. Until then, France had only signed a treaty of similar significance with Germany in 1963, the Élysée Treaty. On 27 September 2021, France had also signed the Franco-Hellenic Strategic Partnership, a bilateral defence agreement between France and Greece that includes a mutual defence clause (Article 2) in the event of an attack by a third country. The partnership was signed during the visit of Greek Prime Minister Kyriakos Mitsotakis to Paris. Paris also hosted the fourth edition of the Paris Peace Forum on 11 November. The French President, Emmanuel Macron, met with Nigerian President Muhammadu Buhari and Bangladeshi Prime Minister Sheikh Hasina, and announced that during the French presidency of the Council of the European Union he would work towards a strategic rapprochement with the African Union. He also announced the delivery of 2 million Covax vaccines to Bangladesh. To mark the beginning of the presidency, the European flag was displayed under the Arc de Triomphe from 31 December to 1 January, which sparked significant controversy in France, as the French flag on the Arc de Triomphe is seen as an untouchable national symbol. Numerous monuments were also illuminated in European colours.

France was in the midst of the campaign for the 2022 presidential election, which took place during the French presidency in the spring. President Macron announced his decision to run for a second term on 3 March 2022, in a letter to the French people published in the regional press. The French President had been politically weakened on the domestic front following his party's loss in the regional and departmental elections in June 2021. Consequently, he relied on the French presidency of the European Union to be a key moment of his term. Macron used his international prominence and pro-European foreign policy to assert himself as a leading candidate in the presidential race, a position his competitors lacked. Some rivals shared his pro-European views, including Anne Hidalgo from the Socialist Party and Valérie Pécresse from Les Républicains. However, others took a more critical stance. Jean-Luc Mélenchon of La France Insoumise, for instance, aimed to enforce a principle of ecological and social non-regression in European policy, planned to organise a European conference on the Western Balkans' accession, and accused Macron of yielding to authoritarian regimes by weakening the rule of law mechanism. Far-right candidates Marine Le Pen of the National Rally and Éric Zemmour of Reconquête, despite Zemmour's convictions for inciting racial hatred, ran on an Eurosceptic platform.

== Programme ==
On 9 December 2021, the French presidency outlined the key priorities for its presidency of the Council of the European Union. These priorities include establishing political oversight for border management and an emergency support mechanism in times of crisis, organising a summit bringing together the leaders of the European Union and the African Union focused on youth and migration flows, holding a conference on the integration of the Western Balkans into the European Union, creating a framework for holding major digital platforms accountable to combat online hate, maintaining the previously adopted programme initiated by France to achieve carbon neutrality by 2050, and implementing a European minimum wage.

A General Secretariat for the French Presidency of the Council of the European Union was established by the decree of 8 December 2020. The General Secretariat operates under the authority of the French Prime Minister. The cost of the French Presidency of the Council of the European Union is estimated at 148 million euros. Nearly 400 events are planned, including 200 meetings of senior officials, around 20 meetings of European Union ministers, 80 ministerial-level meetings, as well as various seminars and conferences. The presidency has chosen the slogan Relance, Puissance, Appartenance (Recovery, Strength, Belonging). The visual identity of the French Presidency incorporates the tricolour flag and the European stars, which come together around the initials of the European Union, U and E. According to the French Secretary of State for European Affairs, Clément Beaune, the arrow in the centre of the second letter symbolises a “message of ambition, hope, [and] future” to confront “the temptations of retreat and surrender.”

== Timeline ==
=== European Day ===
On the occasion of the Europe Day and the Conference on the Future of Europe, President Macron delivered a lengthy speech before the European Parliament, focusing on two major themes: the independence and effectiveness of the Union. During his address, he also expressed his desire to update the Charter of Fundamental Rights, "particularly to be more explicit about environmental protection and the recognition of the right to abortion." Regarding European institutions, President Macron supports granting the European Parliament the right of initiative, a position also supported by the German Federal government. Additionally, he defended Europe's universalist values but did not make any specific commitments regarding the promotion of cultural heritage.

“What unites us is the singularity of this European democratic promise, and also a unique culture, a way of being in the world — dare I say. What does it mean to be European? It means feeling a shared emotion before our treasures, the fruits of our heritage and history, from the Pnyx Hill to the golden bulbs of Kraków, and resonating equally with the romantic spirit, from Chopin’s works to Pessoa’s writings. It also means sharing a civility, a way of being in the world, from our cafés to our museums, that is incomparable. This European way of being in the world is part of our uniqueness, despite our many differences. From ancient Greece to the Roman Empire, from Christianity to the Renaissance and the Enlightenment, we are the heirs to a distinctive approach to the human adventure.”

=== War in Ukraine ===
The issue of Ukraine quickly becomes a top priority for the French presidency. Before a scheduled summit between French President Emmanuel Macron and Russian President Vladimir Putin at the Kremlin, Macron speaks with President Joe Biden on 2 February, Polish President Andrzej Duda and Ukrainian President Volodymyr Zelenskyy on 3 February, German Chancellor Olaf Scholz on 4 February, NATO Secretary General Jens Stoltenberg and British Prime Minister Boris Johnson on 5 February, and Estonian Prime Minister Kaja Kallas on 6 February. During his visit to the Kremlin on 7 February, Macron proposes to Putin the establishment of "concrete security guarantees." However, he does not receive any real indication of de-escalation from his Russian counterpart. Kremlin spokesperson Dmitry Peskov acknowledges the importance of Macron's visit but notes that it is “too complex to expect a decisive breakthrough from just one meeting.” On 20 February, a trilateral phone call between Biden, Putin, and Macron is held to address the tensions in Ukraine, leading to an agreement in principle for a meeting between Biden and Putin. The French presidency’s communiqué stresses that this meeting could only take place if Russia does not invade Ukraine. This agreement collapses in the following days as Russia breaches international law and Ukraine’s territorial integrity.

On 30 May 2022, all 27 EU member states unanimously agreed to impose an embargo on 90% of Russian oil.

=== Versailles Summit ===
“We commend the people of Ukraine for their courage in defending their country and our shared values of freedom and democracy. We will not leave them alone. The EU and its Member States will continue to provide coordinated political, financial, material and humanitarian support. We are committed to provide support for the reconstruction of a democratic Ukraine once the Russian onslaught has ceased. We are determined to increase even further our pressure on Russia and Belarus.”

On 10 and 11 March 2022, the Versailles Summit brought together all the heads of state and government from EU countries at the Château de Versailles. The main focus of the summit was Ukraine. The agenda adopted at the summit, known as the Versailles declaration, formally condemned Russia's invasion of Ukraine, expressed support for the attacked nation, and reaffirmed Kyiv's aspirations to join the European Union. Under the French presidency, the EU delivered arms to a third country for the first time, specifically to Ukraine. Member states collectively agreed to invite the European Commission to begin accession negotiations with Georgia and Moldova. The summit also addressed European defence, energy dependency, and food sovereignty. The second day, 11 March 2022, was dedicated to defence issues. Up to that point, collective defence had been a source of division and disagreement among European leaders. Former Swedish Prime Minister Carl Bildt had expressed confusion about Macron’s call for a "new order of security and stability" in an interview with The Voice of America the previous month: “These next few months rather seem to call for firm defense of the existing post-1989 order,” he said. While Emmanuel Macron had long advocated for the establishment of a collective European defence and not relying solely on NATO, other European partners, such as Sweden, Germany, and Poland, were notably hostile or at least reluctant to pursue this path. This disagreement on common defence policy highlights the significant divergences between France — Europe’s leading military power, a nuclear state, and a permanent member of the UN Security Council — and other EU countries, whose defence relies primarily on NATO. Olivier Costa, Professor at the Centre for Political Research at Sciences Po, notes that France has been seen as overly preoccupied with its own interests and influenced by its historical hostility towards NATO and the United States. Reactions were particularly sharp when the French President highlighted the need to keep engaging with Vladimir Putin and pursue a negotiated settlement to the war in Ukraine.

=== European Cultural Programming ===
Regarding cultural policy, the French presidency introduced the Euroreporters Competition, which ran from January to May 2022 under the theme “Europe Shapes Our Future.” The competition focused on combating disinformation and fake news. The French National Audiovisual Institute Institute also launched a series of videos called “Europe and Us,” aimed at teenagers and young adults, and published on TikTok. These short videos used archival footage to tell stories about the European Union and European culture. Additionally, a series of lectures titled “Europe of Culture in the 17th Century under the Patronage of Christina of Sweden” was organised in Reims, Champagne. To further promote cultural engagement, three concerts were held at the Bibliothèque Nationale de France in Paris, themed “Exploring How Music Enriches Intercultural Dialogue Among Member States,” featuring rare manuscripts from the library.

=== Social rights ===
On 11 January 2022, a conference was held on the protection of posted workers and the fight against fraud. The issue of labour market access and the right to social security, especially for women, was the subject of a meeting on 31 January, where ministers responsible for gender equality from member states discussed the impact of the pandemic on the vulnerability of women and girls. France, along with the Czech Republic and Sweden — set to assume the rotating presidency of the Council of the European Union in the near future — committed to making women's economic empowerment their top priority. On 15 February 2022, in Bordeaux, an informal meeting of the EU Ministers of Labour and Employment was organised, focusing on supporting workers, lifelong learning, and securing career paths amid transitions.

Regarding disability, member states agreed to strengthen research on neurodevelopmental disorders. The right to housing was highlighted as a key theme of the French Council Presidency's social rights agenda. French Housing Minister Emmanuelle Wargon convened a ministerial conference on 7–8 March in Nice with the housing ministers of EU member states, European Commission representatives, and stakeholders from the housing and construction sectors — an event that hadn't occurred since 2013. However, the ministerial conference faced criticism in France from the Union Sociale pour l'Habitat, which expressed scepticism and accused the initiative of being “empty words” rather than a concrete commitment.

=== European Political Community ===
The creation of the European Political Community (Communauté Politique Européenne) was not originally planned as part of the French EU presidency’s programme. However, faced with urgent demands from Moldova and Ukraine for accelerated EU membership and recognizing that “integration will take years, likely several decades,” Emmanuel Macron decided in June 2022 to launch the European Political Community. He stressed that this initiative was not meant to be a substitute for EU enlargement or a replacement for the European Union itself. Macron's idea was to bring together all European countries to collaborate on shared projects.

== Results ==
During the French presidency of the Council of the European Union, member states approved all the rules needed to achieve the 55% reduction target for emissions by 2030, including the carbon border tax for Europe. Regarding the war in Ukraine, the French presidency advocated for and facilitated unprecedented military aid amounting to 2 billion euros. Sanctions were also imposed on Russia and Belarus, along with six packages targeting individuals involved in the aggression and sectors such as finance, transportation, defence, and energy. Moldova and Ukraine were granted candidate status.

In terms of collective defence, the French presidency secured the establishment of the Boussole stratégique (Strategic Compass), which outlines European interests and a shared security and defence strategy, and aims to enhance incentives for investing in European capability projects. The Boussole stratégique is intended to reinforce the European Union's 2016 Global Strategy and build on the momentum for European security and defence initiatives. The Boussole stratégique, the first European White Paper on defence, was adopted by the European Council on 24 March 2022. Federico Santopino from the Research and Information Group on Peace and Security is more critical of the Strategic Compass’s relevance and impact, stating, “Before asking what the Union should do, it is essential to agree on what it is supposed to be. The new Boussole stratégique certainly does not provide that clarity.”

On environmental matters, the French presidency urged the European Commission to accelerate the ecological transition, emphasising that “the human suffering and economic losses due to more frequent extreme weather events, such as floods, heatwaves, droughts, and wildfires”, are intensifying worldwide, with Europe being no exception. The French presidency argued that the green transition could create up to one million jobs, making it a driver of growth.

The French presidency achieved notable economic progress by securing the adoption of a reciprocity instrument for the EU regarding public procurement markets. This measure ensures that third countries can no longer restrict access to their public procurement markets without the EU reciprocating by closing its own markets in response. The Union also established a tool to combat distortive foreign subsidies, meaning that companies from third countries can no longer benefit from government subsidies to win public contracts within the EU.

During its presidency, the EU prepared to adopt the Digital Markets Act (DMA), aimed at curbing the economic dominance of major digital platforms and enhancing consumer choice. This reform was led by Thierry Breton, the French European Commissioner for the Internal Market, and the law came into effect a month after the end of the French presidency, in July 2024. The legislation faced criticism, particularly for its most visible consequence: the removal of access to Google Maps from the Google portal in the name of consumer choice. Under this regulation, gatekeepers can no longer prioritise their own services. Under the new legislation, gatekeepers that fail to comply with these regulations could incur hefty penalties. The European Commission has the power to impose fines of up to 10% of a company's total global revenue, which could increase to 20% for repeat violations, and daily fines of up to 5% of the company’s daily turnover. Additionally, the "Scale-up" initiative was launched, mobilising €3.5 billion to support innovation and the growth of emerging players by engaging institutional investors.

The European Political Community soon found its main purpose in addressing European conflicts: its first summit, held on 6 October 2022 in Prague under the Czech presidency of the EU Council, unequivocally condemned the Russian invasion of Ukraine and reaffirmed support for the country. The third summit, held in Granada, Spain, in 2023, occurred amidst escalating tensions between Azerbaijan and Armenia over Nagorno-Karabakh.

== Gallery ==
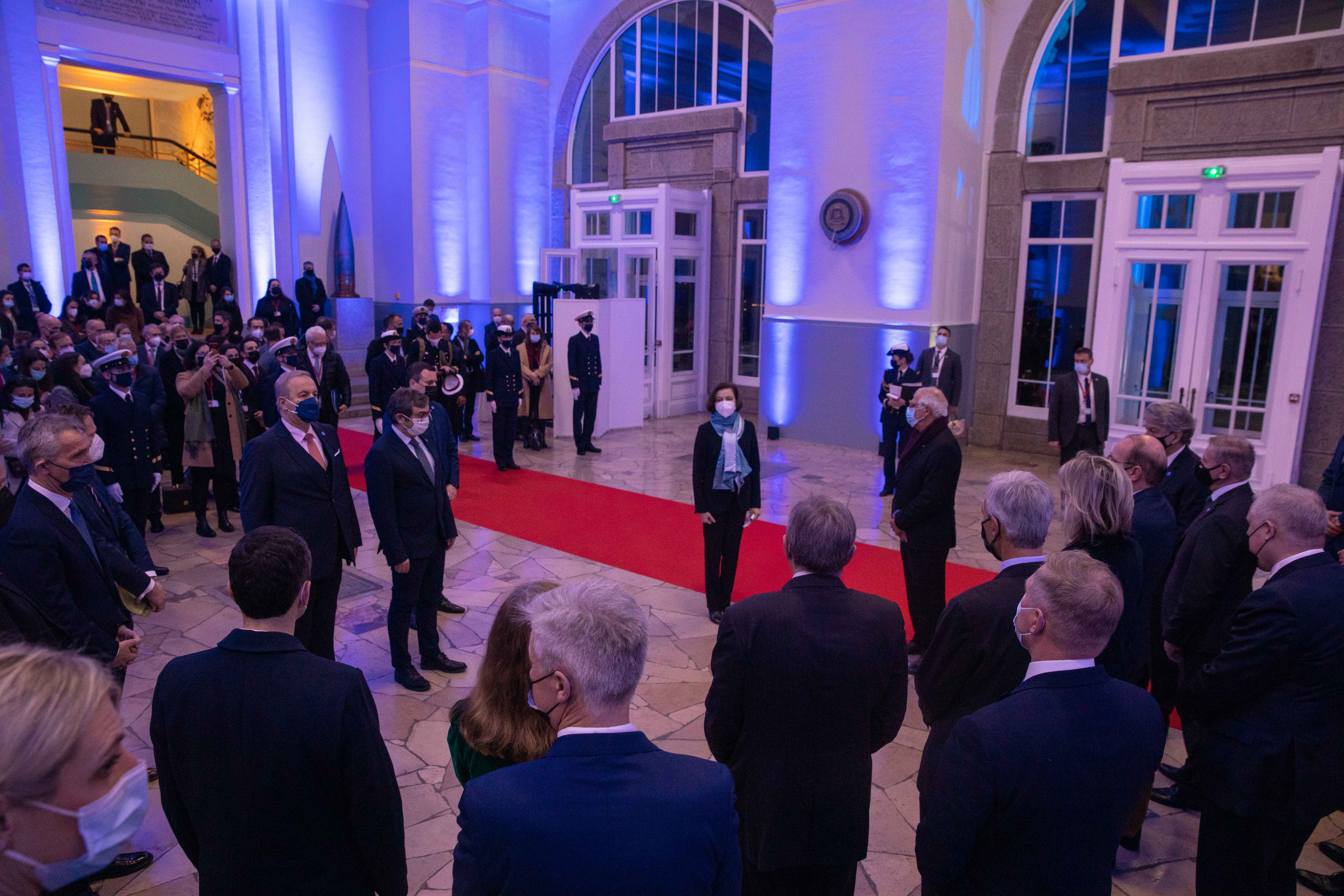
French armed forces minister Florence Parly (center midground) and EU foreign policy chief Josep Borrell (center-right midground) greeting defence ministers of EU states at an informal gathering in Brest, France, on 12 January 2022

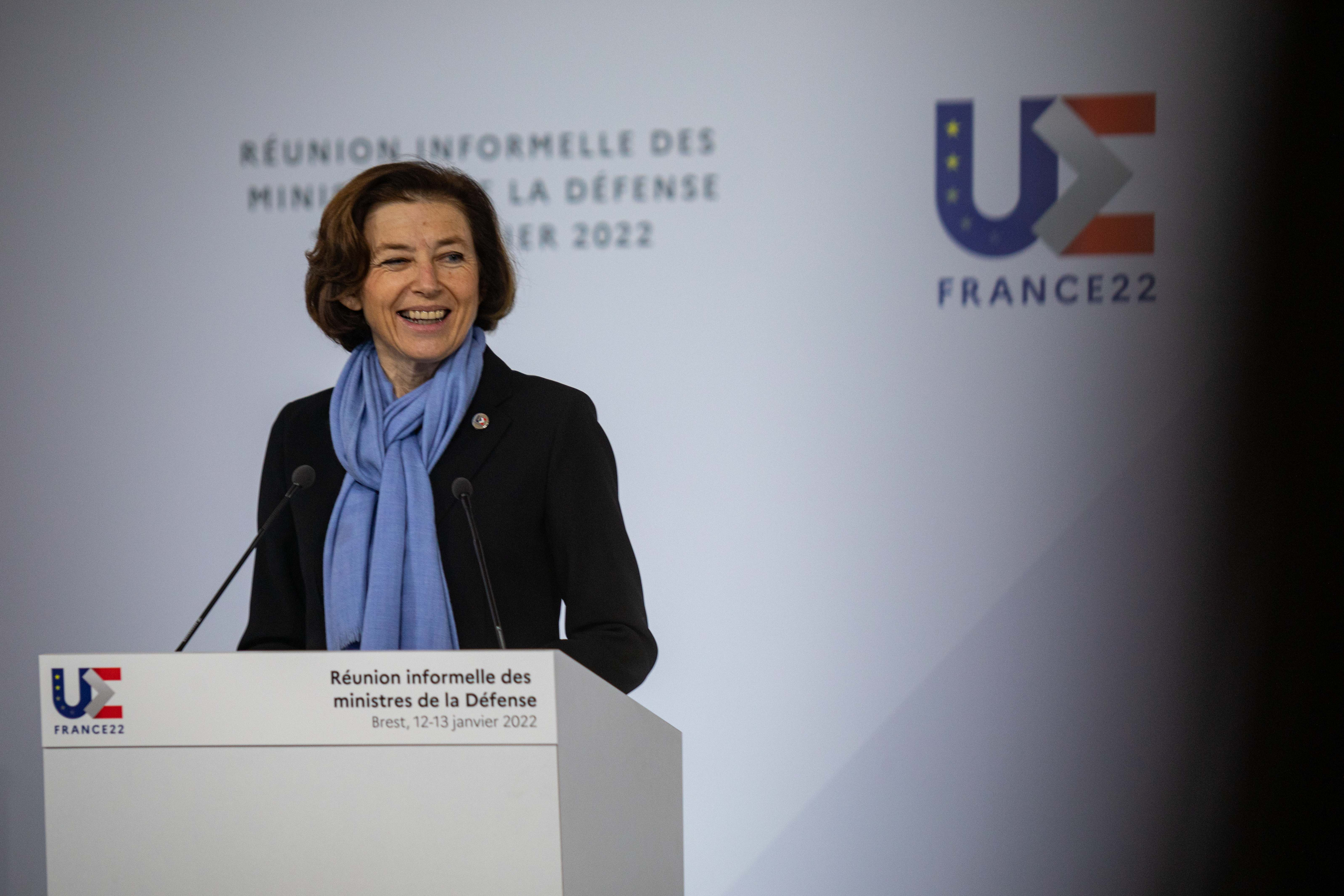
Parly, the next day, at a press conference for the informal gathering

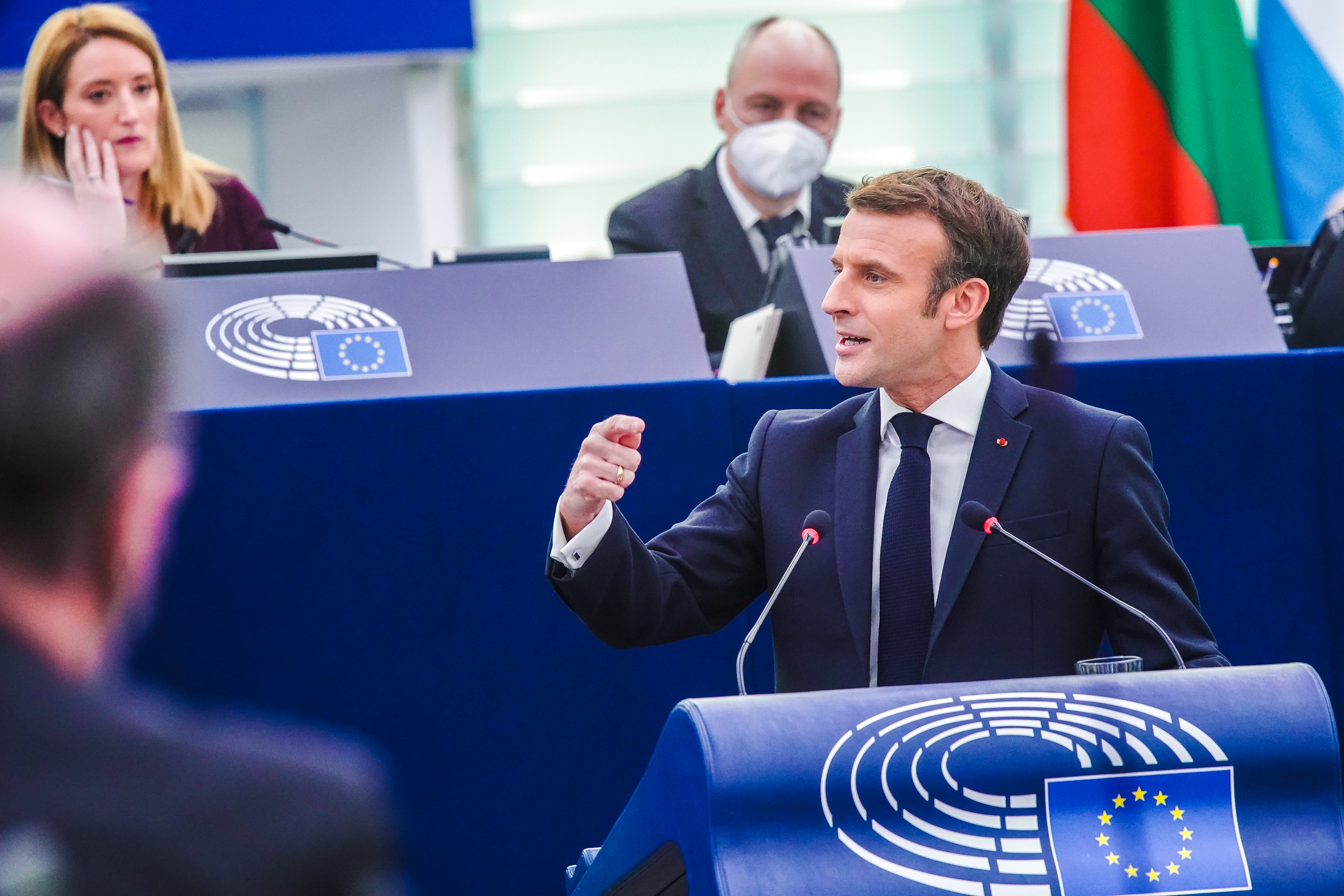
French president Emmanuel Macron presenting to the European Parliament the goals and strategies planned for the French council presidency, at the hemicycle in Strasbourg, 19 January 2022
