= 2017 Estonian Presidency of the Council of the European Union =

From July to December, first of a trio

Estonian Presidency of the Council of the European Union

- Logo of the 2017 Estonian presidency 1 July – 31 December 2017
- Council of the European Union
- Website: https://eu2017.ee

Presidency trio
- Estonia; Bulgaria; Austria

Estonia held the presidency of the Council of the European Union during the second half of 2017. The presidency was the first of three presidencies making up a presidency trio, followed by the presidency of Bulgaria and that of Austria. It was the first time Estonia had held the presidency. The motto that was chosen for the presidency was "Unity through balance".

It was originally intended for the United Kingdom to hold this presidency instead, but after the referendum in June 2016 to leave the EU, the UK government informed the European Union that it would withdraw from the presidency, so the entire rotation of presidencies was brought forward six months, being replaced by Estonia, which was next.

== Overview ==
The Estonian presidency had four major points on its agenda: (1) digital integration and freedom, (2) open economic innovation, (3) safety and security, and (4) sustainable inclusivity.

Politico Europe stated that the Estonian presidency was successful in bringing digital concerns to the forefront, but noted that the presidency was unable to complete all the goals that it had hoped to achieve. Politico Europe gave the presidency high marks in the areas of climate and environment, employment and social policy, and energy, while noting that it did not accomplish much in the area of health.

== Gallery ==
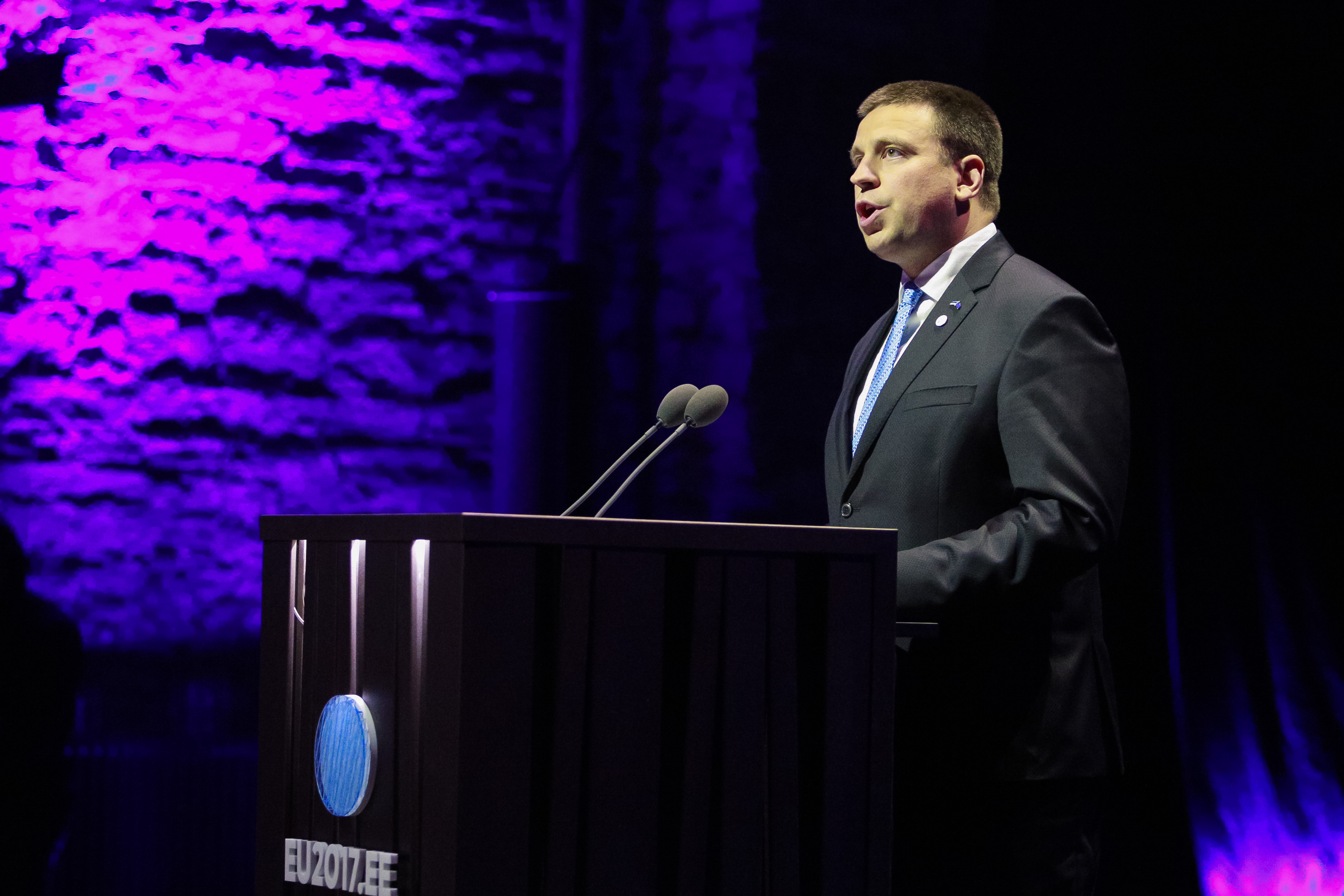
Estonian prime minister Jüri Ratas at the opening concert of the Estonian presidency in Tallinn, 29 June 2017
