= 2021 Portuguese Presidency of the Council of the European Union =

Portuguese Presidency of the Council of the European Union

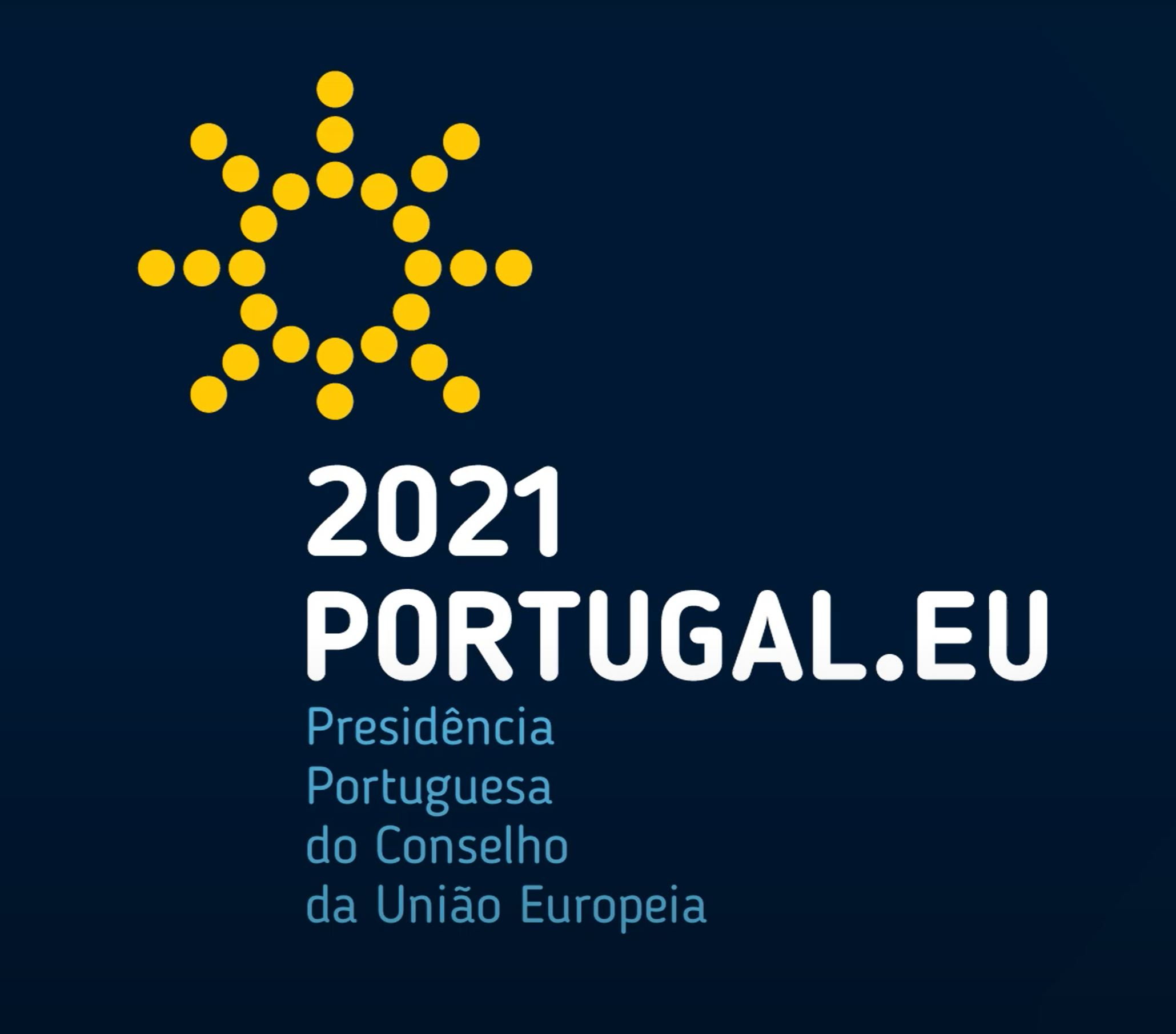
- Logo of the 2021 Portuguese presidency 1 January – 30 June 2021
- Council of the European Union
- Website: 2021portugal.eu

Presidency trio
- Germany; Portugal; Slovenia

The 2021 Portuguese Presidency of the Council of the European Union (PPUE2021) was Portugal's fourth presidency of the Council, held between 1 January and 30 June 2021. Portugal held its first presidency from 1 January until 30 June 1992.

Portugal is part of the 10th Presidency Trio, together with Germany and Slovenia, with which it is working in close trilateral cooperation. This trio is the first in the second cycle of presidencies.

== Presidency trio ==
Trio	Member state	Term
9	Croatia	1 January 2020 – 30 June 2020
10	Germany	1 July 2020 – 31 December 2020
10	Portugal	1 January 2021 – 30 June 2021
10	Slovenia	1 July 2021 – 31 December 2021
11	France	1 January 2022 – 30 June 2022

== Political priorities ==
The political priorities of the Portuguese presidency of the council are:

- Promoting Europe's recovery, leveraged by the climate and digital transitions
- Implementing the Social Pillar of the European Union as a key element to ensure a fair and inclusive climate and digital transition
- Strengthening Europe's strategic autonomy keeping it open to the world

== National government ==
- President of the Republic Marcelo Rebelo de Sousa
- Prime Minister António Costa
- President of the Assembly of the Republic Eduardo Ferro Rodrigues

== Permanent mission to the EU ==
Function	Name (current office holders)
Permanent Representative; Head of Coreper II	Ambassador Nuno Brito
Deputy Permanent Representative; Head of Coreper I	Ambassador Pedro Lourtie
Representative in the Political and Security Committee	Ambassador José Fernando Costa Pereira
Antici; Coreper II	Pedro Pinto
Mertens; Coreper I	Mónica Lisboa
Nicolaidis; Political and Security Committee	Vera Ávila
