= Versailles declaration =

EU response to Russian invasion of Ukraine

The Versailles declaration is a document issued on 11 March 2022 by leaders of the European Union (EU) in Versailles, France in response to the 2022 Russian invasion of Ukraine that had begun two weeks earlier. Although informal, the document reaffirmed the EU's support for Ukraine, and outlined the union's plans for:

- bolstering defence capabilities,
- reducing energy dependencies,
- building a more robust economic base, and
- fostering investment

== See also ==
- Strategic autonomy
