= Presidency of the Council of the European Union =

Rotating presidency of the Council of Ministers

- Emblem of the Council

- Flag of the European Union

- Currently held by Ireland since July 2026
- Council of the European Union
- Seat: Council of the EU: Europa building, Brussels, Belgium; Irish Government: Government Buildings, Dublin
- Appointer: Rotation among the EU member states
- Term length: Six months
- Constituting instrument: Treaties of the European Union
- Formation: 1958
- First holder: Belgium
- Website: irish-presidency.consilium.europa.eu

Presidency trio
- (Republic of Ireland) Ireland • Lithuania • Greece

The presidency of the Council of the European Union is responsible for the functioning of the Council of the European Union, which is the co-legislator of the EU legislature alongside the European Parliament. It rotates among the member states of the EU every six months. The presidency is not an individual, but rather the position is held by a national government. It is sometimes incorrectly referred to as the "president of the European Union". The presidency's function is to chair meetings of the council, determine its agendas, set a work program and facilitate dialogue both at Council meetings and with other EU institutions. The presidency is currently, as of July 2026, held by Ireland.

Three successive presidencies are known as presidency trios. The current trio is made up of Ireland (July–December 2026), Lithuania (January–June 2027), and Greece (July–December 2027). The 2020 German presidency began the second cycle of presidencies, after the system was introduced in 2007.

== History ==
When the Council was established, its work was minimal and the presidency rotated between each of the then six members every six months. However, as the work load of the Council grew and the membership increased, the lack of coordination between each successive six-month presidency hindered the development of long-term priorities for the EU.

In order to rectify the lack of coordination, the idea of trio presidencies was put forward where groups of three successive presidencies cooperated on a common political program. This was implemented in 2007 and formally laid down in the EU treaties in 2009 by the Treaty of Lisbon.

Until 2009, the Presidency had assumed political responsibility in all areas of European integration and it played a vital role in brokering high-level political decisions.

The Treaty of Lisbon reduced the importance of the Presidency significantly by officially separating the European Council from the Council of the European Union. Simultaneously it split the foreign affairs Council configuration from the General Affairs configuration and created the position of High Representative of the Union for Foreign Affairs and Security Policy.

After the United Kingdom's vote to leave the European Union in 2016 and its subsequent relinquishment of its scheduled presidency in the Council of the European Union which was due to take place from July to December 2017, the rotation of presidencies was brought six months forward. Estonia was scheduled to take over the UK's six-month slot instead. The presidency is currently (as of July 2026) held by Ireland.

== Functioning ==
The Council meets in various formations where its composition depends on the topic discussed. For example, the Agriculture Council is composed of the national ministers responsible for Agriculture.

The primary responsibility of the Presidency is to organise and chair all meetings of the council, apart from the Foreign Affairs Council which is chaired by the High Representative. So, for instance, the Minister of Agriculture for the state holding the presidency chairs the Agriculture council. This role includes working out compromises capable of resolving difficulties.

Article 16(9) of the Treaty on European Union provides:

The Presidency of Council configurations, other than that of Foreign Affairs, shall be held by Member State representatives in the Council on the basis of equal rotation, in accordance with the conditions established in accordance with Article 236 of the Treaty on the Functioning of the European Union

Each three successive presidencies cooperate on a "triple-shared presidency" work together over an 18-month period to accomplish a common agenda by the current president simply continuing the work of the previous "lead-president" after the end of his/her term. This ensures more consistency in comparison to a usual single six-month presidency and each three includes a new member state. This allows new member states to hold the presidency sooner and helps old member states pass their experience to the new members.

The role of the rotating Council Presidency includes:

- agenda-setting powers: in its 6-month programme, it decides on the order to discuss propositions, after they have been submitted by the Commission in its agenda monopoly powers
- brokering inter-institutional compromise: Formal Trilogue meetings between Commission, Parliament and Council are held to reach early consensus in the codecision legislative procedure; the Presidency takes part to the Conciliation Committee between Parliament and Council in the third stage of the codecision legislative procedure
- coordinating national policies and brokering compromise between member states in the council ("confessional system")
- management and administration of the council, external and internal representation

Holding the rotating Council Presidency includes both advantages and disadvantages for member states; The opportunities include:

1. member states have the possibility to show their negotiating skills, as "honest brokers", thus gaining influence and prestige
2. member states gain a privileged access to information: at the end of their term, they know member states' preferences better than anyone else
3. the Council programme may enable member states to focus Council discussion on issues of particular national/regional interest (for example Finland and the Northern Dimension initiative)

The burdens include:

1. lack of administrative capacities and experience, especially for small and new member states; the concept of trio/troika has been introduced to enable member states to share experiences and ensure coherence on an 18-months base
2. expenses in time and money, needed to support the administrative machine
3. not being able to push through their own interests, as the role of Council Presidency is seen as an impartial instance; member states trying to push for initiatives of their own national interest are likely to see them failing in the medium run (for example the French 2008 Presidency and the Union for the Mediterranean project), as they need consensus and do not have enough time to reach it. This element is particularly substantial: holding the presidency may be, on balance, a disadvantage for member states

== List of rotations ==
Period		Trio	Holder	Head of government (Note: Asterisk: Head of government is also head of state. This is the case for Cyprus and was the case for France until October 1958.)
1958	January–June		Belgium	Achille Van Acker; Gaston Eyskens (from 26 June)
1958	July–December		West Germany	Konrad Adenauer
1959	January–June		France	Charles de Gaulle*; Michel Debré (from 8 January)
1959	July–December		Italy	Antonio Segni
1960	January–June		Luxembourg	Pierre Werner
1960	July–December		Netherlands	Jan de Quay
1961	January–June		Belgium	Gaston Eyskens; Théo Lefèvre (from 25 April)
1961	July–December		West Germany	Konrad Adenauer
1962	January–June		France	Michel Debré; Georges Pompidou (from 14 April)
1962	July–December		Italy	Amintore Fanfani
1963	January–June		Luxembourg	Pierre Werner
1963	July–December		Netherlands	Jan de Quay; Victor Marijnen (from 24 July)
1964	January–June		Belgium	Théo Lefèvre
1964	July–December		West Germany	Ludwig Erhard
1965	January–June		France	Georges Pompidou
1965	July–December		Italy	Aldo Moro
1966	January–June		Luxembourg	Pierre Werner
1966	July–December		Netherlands	Jo Cals; Jelle Zijlstra (from 22 November)
1967	January–June		Belgium	Paul Vanden Boeynants
1967	July–December		West Germany	Kurt Georg Kiesinger
1968	January–June		France	Georges Pompidou
1968	July–December		Italy	Giovanni Leone; Mariano Rumor (from 12 December)
1969	January–June		Luxembourg	Pierre Werner
1969	July–December		Netherlands	Piet de Jong
1970	January–June		Belgium	Gaston Eyskens
1970	July–December		West Germany	Willy Brandt
1971	January–June		France	Jacques Chaban-Delmas
1971	July–December		Italy	Emilio Colombo
1972	January–June		Luxembourg	Pierre Werner
1972	July–December		Netherlands	Barend Biesheuvel
1973	January–June		Belgium	Gaston Eyskens; Edmond Leburton (from 26 January)
1973	July–December		Denmark	Anker Jørgensen; Poul Hartling (from 19 December)
1974	January–June		West Germany	Willy Brandt; Walter Scheel (7–16 May); Helmut Schmidt (from 16 May)
1974	July–December		France	Jacques Chirac
1975	January–June		Ireland	Liam Cosgrave
1975	July–December		Italy	Aldo Moro
1976	January–June		Luxembourg	Gaston Thorn
1976	July–December		Netherlands	Joop den Uyl
1977	January–June		United Kingdom	James Callaghan
1977	July–December		Belgium	Leo Tindemans
1978	January–June		Denmark	Anker Jørgensen
1978	July–December		West Germany	Helmut Schmidt
1979	January–June		France	Raymond Barre
1979	July–December		Ireland	Jack Lynch; Charles Haughey (from 11 December)
1980	January–June		Italy	Francesco Cossiga
1980	July–December		Luxembourg	Pierre Werner
1981	January–June		Netherlands	Dries van Agt
1981	July–December		United Kingdom	Margaret Thatcher
1982	January–June		Belgium	Wilfried Martens
1982	July–December		Denmark	Anker Jørgensen; Poul Schlüter (from 10 September)
1983	January–June		West Germany	Helmut Kohl
1983	July–December		Greece	Andreas Papandreou
1984	January–June		France	Pierre Mauroy
1984	July–December		Ireland	Garret FitzGerald
1985	January–June		Italy	Bettino Craxi
1985	July–December		Luxembourg	Jacques Santer
1986	January–June		Netherlands	Ruud Lubbers
1986	July–December		United Kingdom	Margaret Thatcher
1987	January–June		Belgium	Wilfried Martens
1987	July–December		Denmark	Poul Schlüter
1988	January–June		West Germany	Helmut Kohl
1988	July–December		Greece	Andreas Papandreou
1989	January–June		Spain	Felipe González
1989	July–December		France	Michel Rocard
1990	January–June		Ireland	Charles Haughey
1990	July–December		Italy	Giulio Andreotti
1991	January–June		Luxembourg	Jacques Santer
1991	July–December		Netherlands	Ruud Lubbers
1992	January–June		Portugal	Aníbal Cavaco Silva
1992	July–December		United Kingdom	John Major
1993	January–June		Denmark	Poul Schlüter; Poul Nyrup Rasmussen (from 25 January)
1993	July–December		Belgium	Jean-Luc Dehaene
1994	January–June		Greece	Andreas Papandreou
1994	July–December		Germany	Helmut Kohl
1995	January–June		France	Édouard Balladur; Alain Juppé (from 17 May)
1995	July–December		Spain	Felipe González
1996	January–June		Italy	Lamberto Dini; Romano Prodi (from 17 May)
1996	July–December		Ireland	John Bruton
1997	January–June		Netherlands	Wim Kok
1997	July–December		Luxembourg	Jean-Claude Juncker
1998	January–June		United Kingdom	Tony Blair
1998	July–December		Austria	Viktor Klima
1999	January–June		Germany	Gerhard Schröder
1999	July–December		Finland	Paavo Lipponen
2000	January–June		Portugal	António Guterres
2000	July–December		France	Lionel Jospin
2001	January–June		Sweden	Göran Persson
2001	July–December		Belgium	Guy Verhofstadt
2002	January–June		Spain	José María Aznar
2002	July–December		Denmark	Anders Fogh Rasmussen
2003	January–June		Greece	Costas Simitis
2003	July–December		Italy	Silvio Berlusconi
2004	January–June		Ireland	Bertie Ahern
2004	July–December		Netherlands	Jan Peter Balkenende
2005	January–June		Luxembourg	Jean-Claude Juncker
2005	July–December		United Kingdom	Tony Blair
2006	January–June		Austria	Wolfgang Schüssel
2006	July–December		Finland (Note: Germany was due to succeed Austria in 2006 but stepped aside as general elections were scheduled for that period. Finland, as next in line, took Germany's place. Eventually the German elections took place in 2005 due to a loss of confidence vote, but the re-arrangement remained.)	Matti Vanhanen
2007	January–June	T1	Germany	Angela Merkel
2007	July–December	T1	Portugal	José Sócrates
2008	January–June	T1	Slovenia	Janez Janša
2008	July–December	T2	France	François Fillon
2009	January–June	T2	Czech Republic	Mirek Topolánek; Jan Fischer (from 8 May)
2009	July–December	T2	Sweden	Fredrik Reinfeldt
2010	January–June	T3	Spain	José Luis Rodríguez Zapatero
2010	July–December	T3	Belgium	Yves Leterme
2011	January–June	T3	Hungary	Viktor Orbán
2011	July–December	T4	Poland	Donald Tusk
2012	January–June	T4	Denmark	Helle Thorning-Schmidt
2012	July–December	T4	Cyprus	Demetris Christofias*
2013	January–June	T5	Ireland	Enda Kenny
2013	July–December	T5	Lithuania	Algirdas Butkevičius
2014	January–June	T5	Greece	Antonis Samaras
2014	July–December	T6	Italy	Matteo Renzi
2015	January–June	T6	Latvia	Laimdota Straujuma
2015	July–December	T6	Luxembourg	Xavier Bettel
2016	January–June	T7	Netherlands	Mark Rutte
2016	July–December	T7	Slovakia	Robert Fico
2017	January–June	T7	Malta	Joseph Muscat
2017	July–December	T8	Estonia (Note: It was originally intended for the United Kingdom to hold the presidency from 1 July to 31 December 2017, but after a referendum in June 2016 to leave the EU, the UK government informed the European Union that it would abandon its presidency for late 2017 and was replaced by Estonia.)	Jüri Ratas
2018	January–June	T8	Bulgaria	Boyko Borisov
2018	July–December	T8	Austria	Sebastian Kurz
2019	January–June	T9	Romania	Viorica Dăncilă
2019	July–December	T9	Finland	Antti Rinne; Sanna Marin (from 10 December)
2020	January–June	T9	Croatia	Andrej Plenković
2020	July–December	T10	Germany	Angela Merkel
2021	January–June	T10	Portugal	António Costa
2021	July–December	T10	Slovenia	Janez Janša
2022	January–June	T11	France	Jean Castex; Élisabeth Borne (from 16 May)
2022	July–December	T11	Czech Republic	Petr Fiala
2023	January–June	T11	Sweden	Ulf Kristersson
2023	July–December	T12	Spain	Pedro Sánchez
2024	January–June	T12	Belgium	Alexander De Croo
2024	July–December	T12	Hungary	Viktor Orbán
2025	January–June	T13	Poland	Donald Tusk
2025	July–December	T13	Denmark	Mette Frederiksen
2026	January–June	T13	Cyprus	Nikos Christodoulides*
2026	July–December	T14	Ireland	Micheál Martin
2027	January–June	T14	Lithuania	TBD
2027	July–December	T14	Greece	TBD
2028	January–June	T15	Italy	TBD
2028	July–December	T15	Latvia	TBD
2029	January–June	T15	Luxembourg	TBD
2029	July–December	T16	Netherlands	TBD
2030	January–June	T16	Slovakia	TBD
2030	July–December	T16	Malta	TBD

== See also ==
- List of presidents of the institutions of the European Union
  - President of the European Parliament
  - President of the European Council
  - President of the European Commission
- President of the European Union
- Council of the European Union
- NATO summit
