= 2018 Bulgarian Presidency of the Council of the European Union =

From January to June, second of a trio

Bulgarian Presidency of the Council of the European Union

- Logo of the 2018 Bulgarian presidency 1 January – 30 June 2018
- Council of the European Union
- Website: https://eu2018bg.bg

Presidency trio
- Estonia; Bulgaria; Austria

Bulgaria held the presidency of the Council of the European Union during the first half of 2018. The presidency was the second of three presidencies making up a presidency trio, which began with the presidency of Estonia, and was followed by that of Austria. It was the first time Bulgaria had held the presidency. The motto that was chosen for the presidency was "United we stand strong".

== Overview ==
The Bulgarian presidency had four major points on its agenda: (1) closing socioeconomic gaps, (2) planning for integration with states of the Western Balkans, (3) providing security and stability, and (4) adapting the economy in response to digital advances. The presidency also had to face issues pertaining to the United Kingdom's exit from the European Union (Brexit), the continuing influx of refugees and migrants, and the planning for a new multiyear budget for the union.

Culture and classical music played a symbolic role during the Bulgarian presidency. Bulgaria chose to mark both the opening and the closing of its presidency with major classical music events. The presidency was officially opened in Brussels with a gala concert at the Palais des Beaux-Arts (BOZAR), performed by the Sofia Philharmonic Orchestra under conductor Nayden Todorov, featuring soprano Sonya Yoncheva and pianist Ludmil Angelov.

The closing event of the presidency took place in Sofia with a performance of Gustav Mahler's Symphony No. 8, performed by the Sofia Philharmonic Orchestra together with the Bulgarian National Radio Symphony Orchestra under the direction of conductor Emil Tabakov.

Vladislava Gubalova, a research fellow at the GLOBSEC Policy Institute, described the presidency as "more about style than substance". Gubalova stated that although the presidency did not make any major missteps, the progress that it made would likely not be seen as historic. Overall, Gubalova considered the presidency satisfactory, and reported that it showed that Bulgaria was able to competently handle the competing interests of the European Union.

== Gallery ==
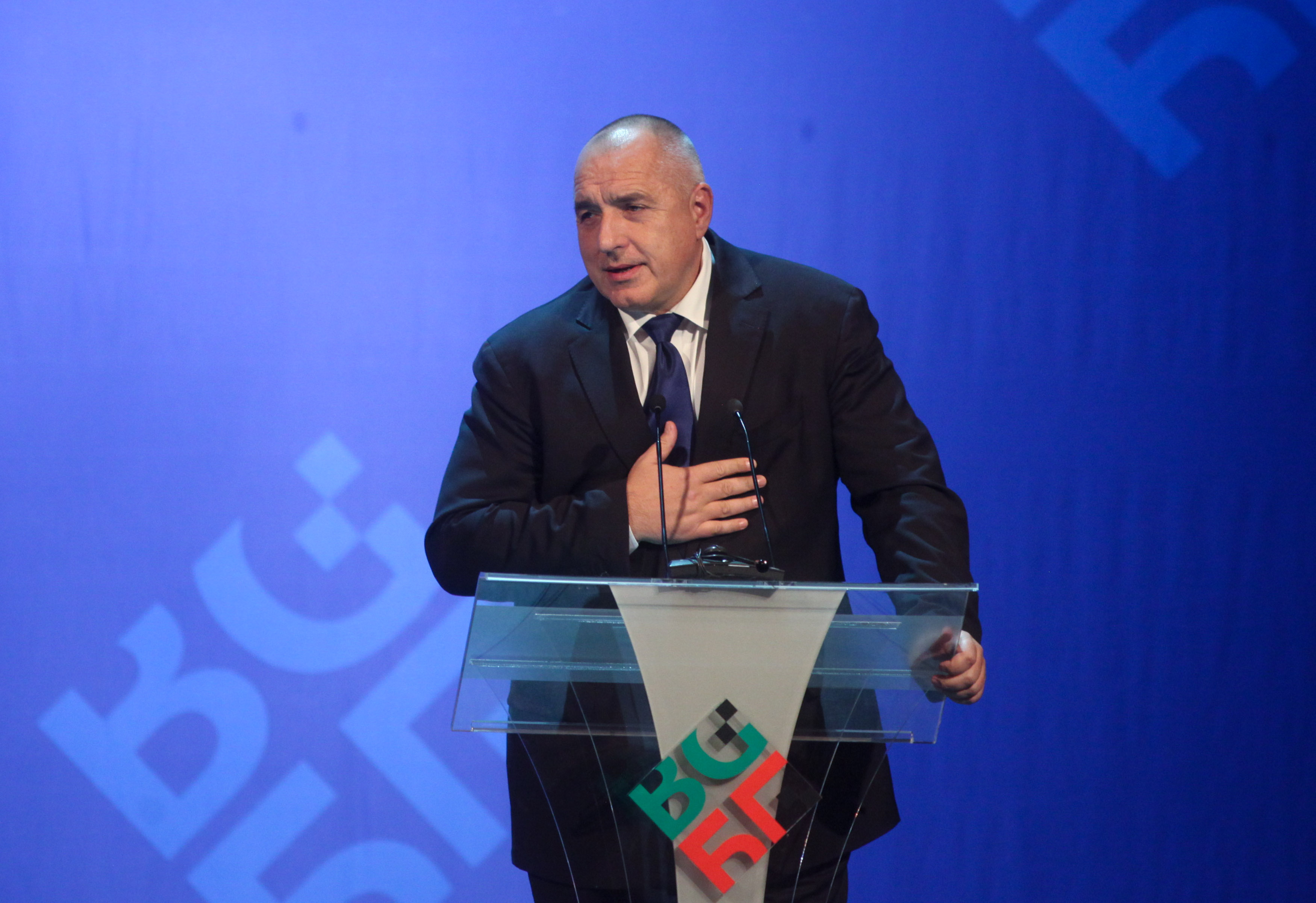
Bulgarian prime minister Boyko Borisov at the opening ceremony of the Bulgarian presidency, at Sofia's National Palace of Culture, 11 January 2018

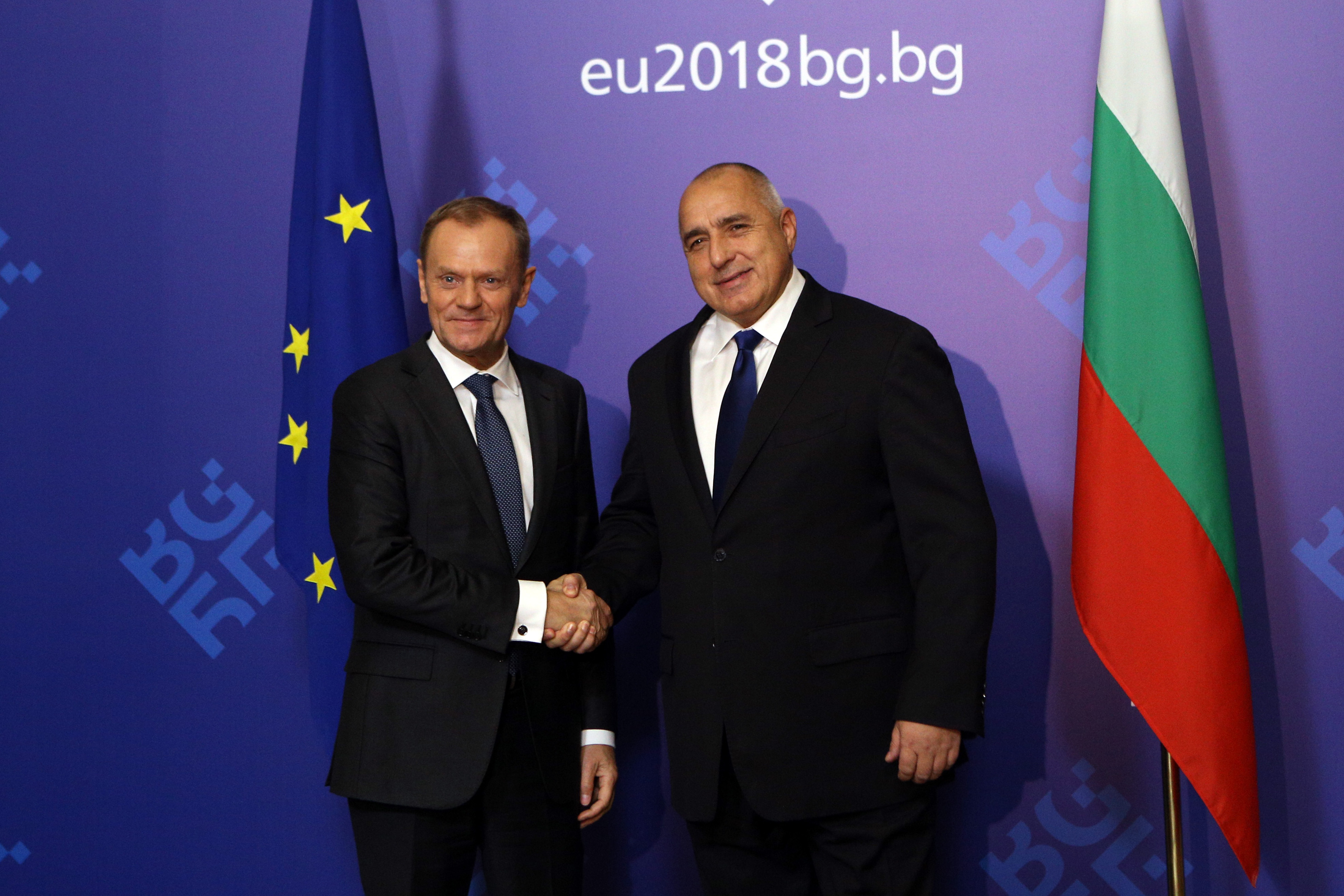
Bulgarian Prime Minister Boyko Borisov with President of the European Council Donald Tusk in Sofia, 11 January 2018

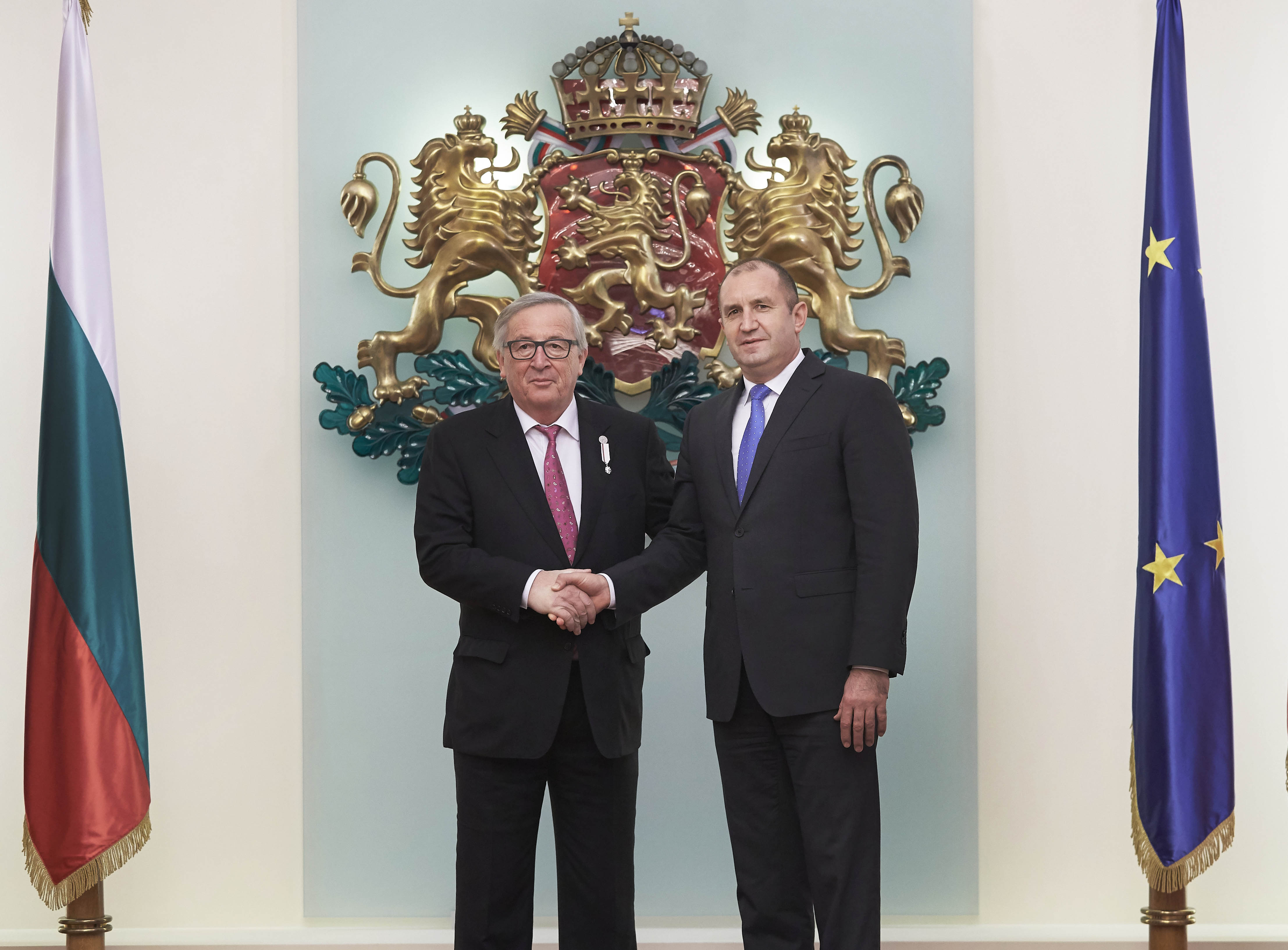
Bulgarian President Rumen Radev with President of the European Commission Jean-Claude Juncker in Sofia, 12 January 2018
