= 2018 Austrian Presidency of the Council of the European Union =

From July to December, last of a trio

Austrian Presidency of the Council of the European Union

- Logo of the 2018 Austrian presidency 1 July – 31 December 2018
- Council of the European Union
- Website: www.eu2018.at

Presidency trio
- Estonia; Bulgaria; Austria

Austria held the presidency of the Council of the European Union during the second half of 2018. The presidency was the last of three presidencies making up a presidency trio, which began with the presidency of Estonia, followed by that of Bulgaria. It was the third time Austria had held the presidency.

The Austria presidency aimed to address three major areas: improvement through digitalization, illegal immigration, and European stabilization. The motto that was chosen for the presidency was "A Europe that protects". The presidency was also involved in negotiations dealing with the United Kingdom's exit from the European Union (Brexit).

== Gallery ==
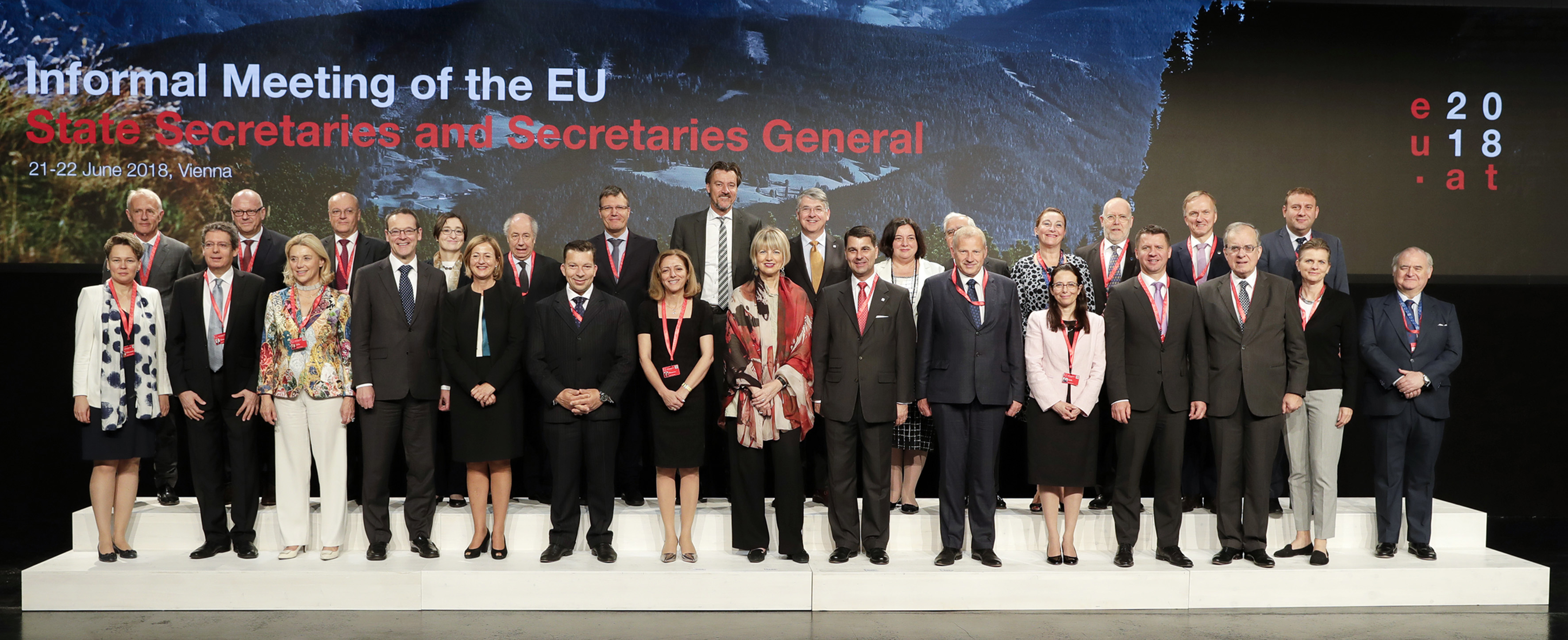
Foreign ministers of EU states on the second day of an informal gathering in Vienna prior to the start of the presidency, 22 June 2018

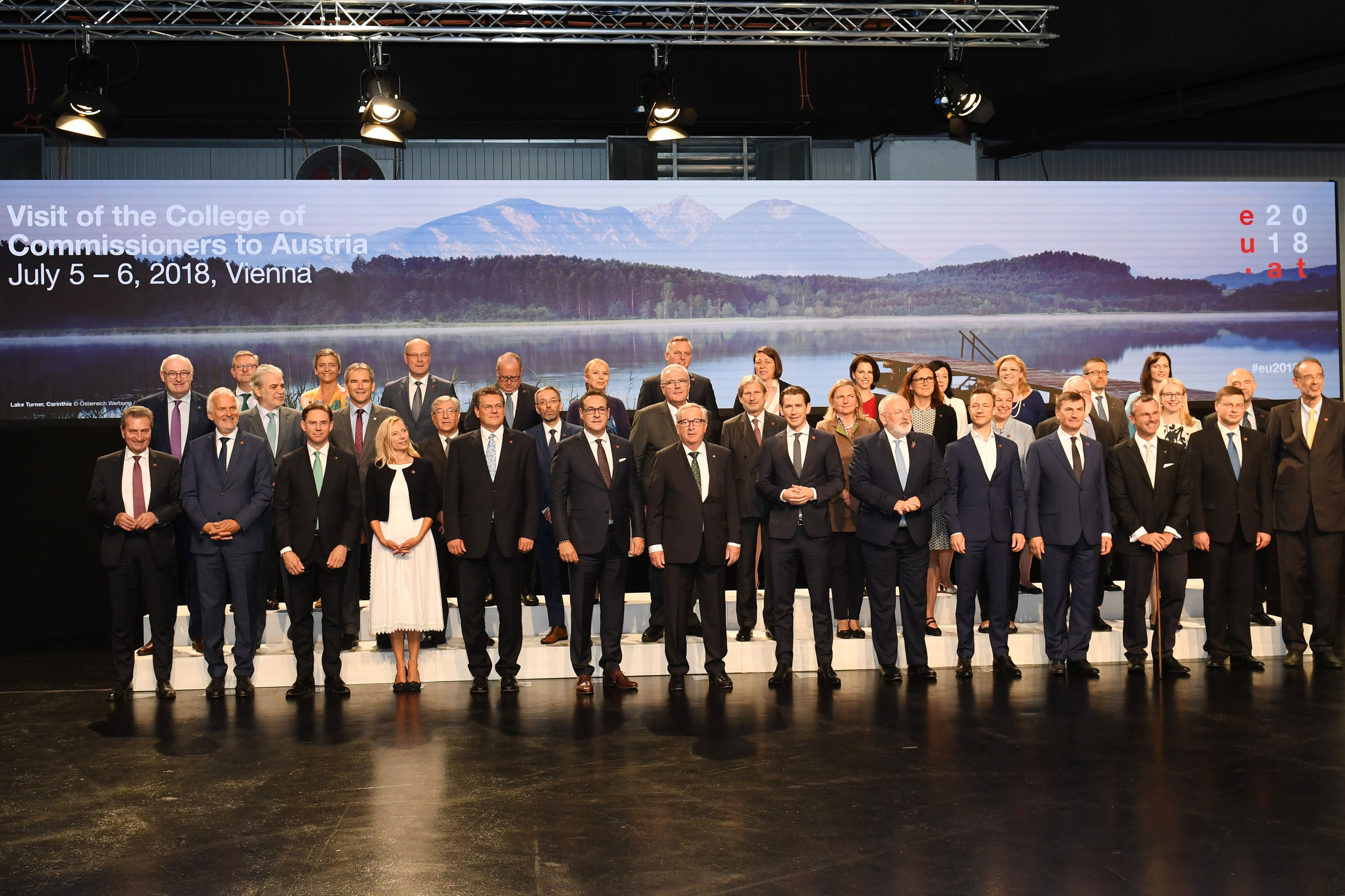
Austrian chancellor Sebastian Kurz hosting the European College of Commissioners in Vienna, 6 July 2018

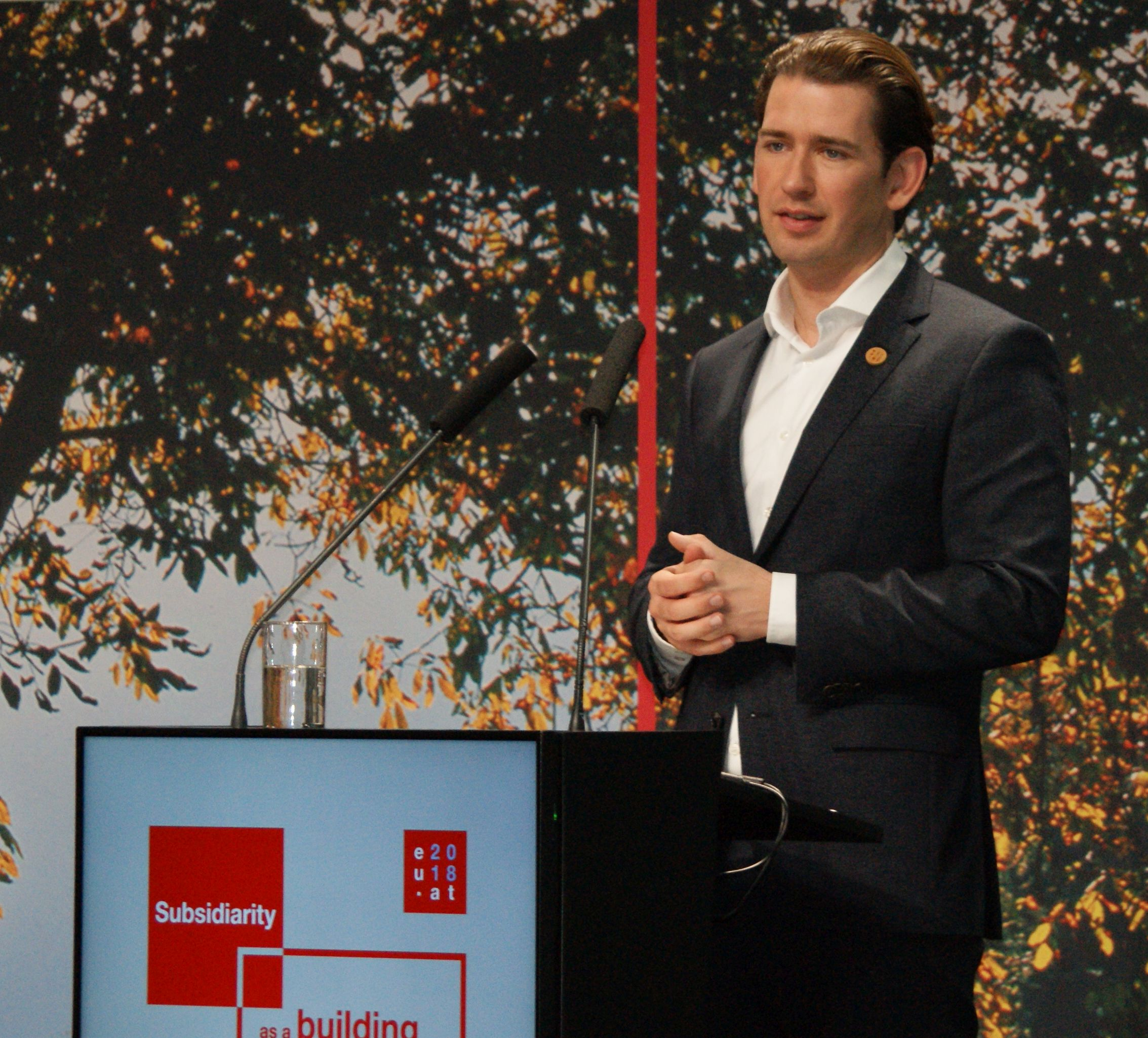
Kurz at the Subsidiarity Conference in Bregenz, Austria, in November
