= 2022 Czech Presidency of the Council of the European Union =

Czech Presidency of the Council of the European Union

- Logo of the 2022 Czech presidency 1 July – 31 December 2022
- Council of the European Union
- Website: (archived)

Presidency trio
- France; Czech Republic; Sweden

The Czech Republic's second Presidency of the Council of the European Union was held between 1 July and 31 December 2022. The country previously held the presidency from 1 January until 30 June 2009.

The Czech presidency is part of the 11th Presidency Trio, together with France and Sweden. This trio is the first in the third cycle of presidencies. The presidency occurred under the leadership of Petr Fiala's Cabinet, though preparations started under the government of Andrej Babiš.

Following the 2021 Czech legislative election, Fiala replaced Babiš as Prime Minister, and appointed Mikuláš Bek as Minister for European Affairs to help coordinate the presidency, along with Minister of Foreign Affairs Jan Lipavský. On 9 June 2022 the slogan of the presidency was announced as "Europe as a task: rethink, rebuild, repower." The Czech Presidency started on 1 July 2022 with an opening ceremony in Litomyšl.
