= Sonya Yoncheva =

Bulgarian - Swiss operatic soprano (born 1981)

- Соня Йончева
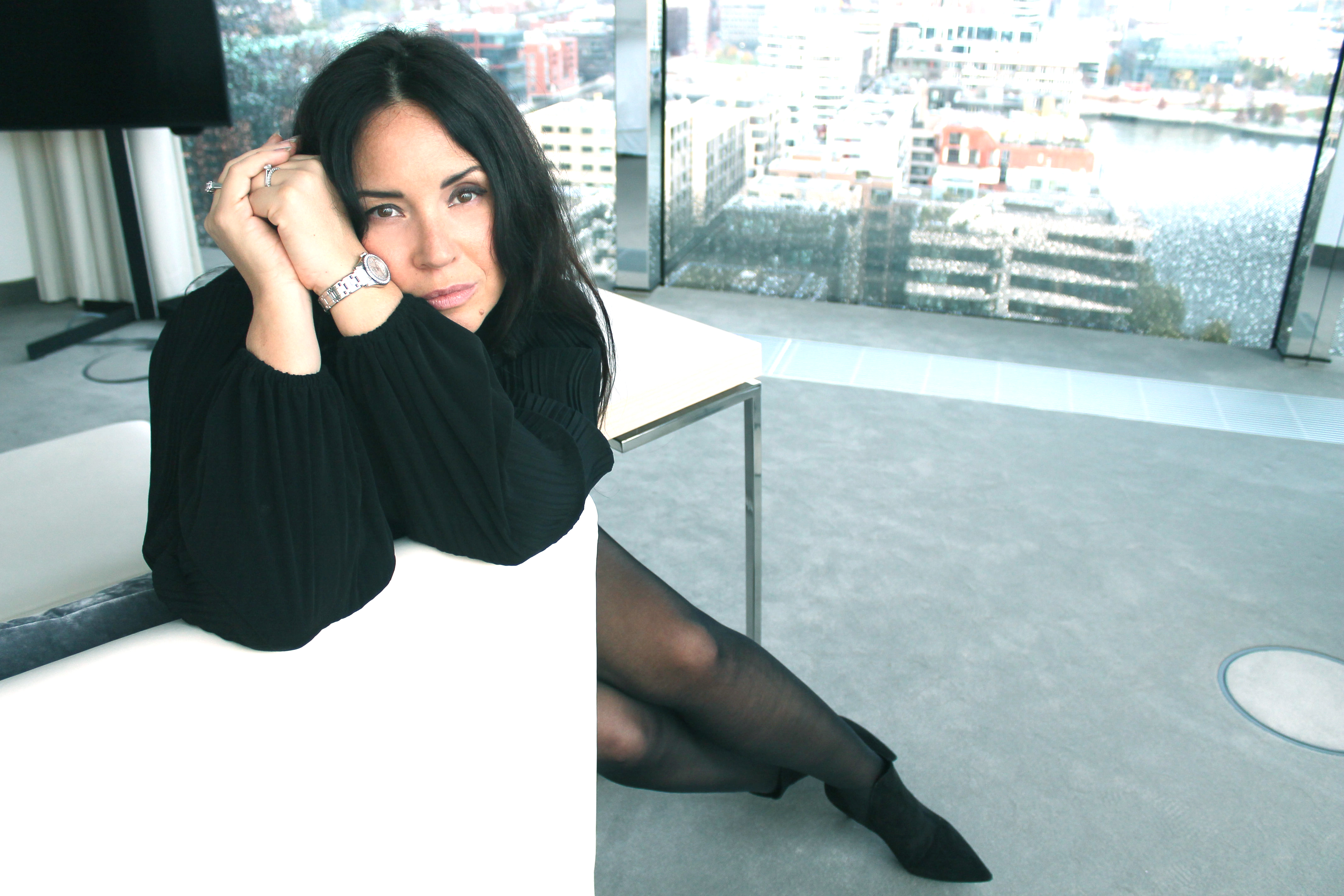
- Yoncheva in 2019
- Born: 25 December 1981 (age 44); Plovdiv, Bulgaria
- Occupation: Operatic soprano
- Years active: 2007–present
- Spouse: Domingo Hindoyan (m. 2014)
- Relatives: Marin Yonchev (brother)
- Website: www.sonyayoncheva.com

Sonya Yoncheva (Bulgarian: Соня Йончева; born 25 December 1981) is a Bulgarian - Swiss operatic soprano, producer and founder of the production company SY11 and of the Bulgarian Artist Magazine.

== Early life ==
Yoncheva was born in Plovdiv, Bulgaria. She studied piano and voice at the National School for Music and Dance in Plovdiv. During her teenage years, she hosted a Bulgarian television show about music. She won several music competitions in Bulgaria in 2000 and 2001, including a joint win with her brother as "Singers of the Year 2000" in the "Hit-1" competition organised and produced by Bulgarian National Television.

She took advanced studies in classical singing with Danielle Borst at the Conservatoire de Musique de Genève and obtained the master's degree in 2009.

== Career ==
Yoncheva was an invited participant in William Christie's "Jardin des Voix" academy for young singers in 2007. She has continued work in the baroque repertoire with Christie, and also with Emmanuelle Haïm.

Yoncheva was the female first-place winner of the 2010 Operalia competition and the special CulturArte prize. In May 2011, she portrayed Cleopatra in a co-production of Giulio Cesare by the Atelier lyrique de Tourcoing and Opéra de Reims, performances of which also took place at the Royal Opera of Versailles. In June she performed in L'elisir d'amore as Adina as part of Festival Nuits Musicales Sainte Victoire in Peynier.

Her debut at the Metropolitan Opera was in November 2013 when she stepped in as Gilda in Rigoletto, in advance of her previously scheduled official debut. In 2014 at the Met, she sang her stage role debut as Mimì (La bohème) in November and shared the role of Violetta (La traviata) in December. In 2015 she appeared as Desdemona in the season opening production of Otello the Metropolitan Opera and in September 2016 she made her debut as Norma at the Royal Opera House, where she sang Antonia in Les contes d'Hoffmann in November of the same year.

In June 2017 she made her debut at the Teatro alla Scala as Mimì in La bohème. She made her role debut in the title role of Puccini's Tosca at the Metropolitan Opera for their 2017/18 season to great critical acclaim. Yoncheva set a record as first singer to appear in leading roles in three movie-theater broadcasts of the Metropolitan Opera in one season (Tosca, Mimi in La bohème and Luisa Miller in the 2017/18 season). Other role debuts in the 2017/18 season include Luisa Miller at the Metropolitan Opera and Élisabeth de Valois in Don Carlos at the Paris Opera. For her role debut as Imogene in Bellini's Il pirata at the Teatro alla Scala in June 2018, the first production of the piece after a legendary 1958 staging with Maria Callas as Imogene the press proclaimed that her performance would "surely see Yoncheva enter La Scala's hall of fame alongside Callas". In summer 2018 Yoncheva sang the role of Poppea in L'incoronazione di Poppea at the Salzburg Festival.

Yoncheva began the 2018/19 season performing the title role of Médée in a staging at Staatsoper Berlin conducted by Daniel Barenboim. Other performances in 2018/19 included Desdemona in Verdi's Otello and the title part of Iolanta at the Metropolitan Opera, Desdemona in a new production for Festspielhaus Baden-Baden and at the Berlin Philharmonic Hall as well as Tosca at Staatsoper Berlin.

In the spring of 2019, Sonya Yoncheva announced that she was expecting her second child in the coming fall as a result of which she did not perform from mid-July to November 2019. She returned to the stage for the concerts of the Puccini Gala at the Elbphilharmonie in Hamburg, the Tchaikovsky Hall in Moscow, and in Sofia. In the 2019/20 season, she performed Mimì in La bohème at the Royal Opera House Covent Garden, the title role of Médée at the Staatsoper Berlin and as Imogene in Il pirata to the Teatro Real in Madrid. Several important role debuts in the 2019/20 and 2020/21 season had to be cancelled due to the COVID-19 pandemic, among them her first Manon Lescaut, Leonora in Il trovatore and Rusalka at the Metropolitan Opera as well as Fedora at the Teatro alla Scala (but she actually sang Fedora at Scala in 2022).

In spring 2020, Yoncheva returned to the stage after the first European lockdown as the soprano soloist of Ludwig van Beethoven's 9th Symphony at the Victoria Hall in Geneva, telecast by Arte. She also participated in the 2020 edition of Le Concert de Paris in front of the Eiffel Tower in Paris, performed the title role of La traviata at the Maggio Musicale Fiorentino and appeared in concert at the Salzburg Festival, at the Arena di Verona, in Lucca and Caserta.

In summer 2020, Sonya Yoncheva and Rolex announced a concert series in aid of musicians affected by the pandemic and the ongoing cancellations. Yoncheva was the host of the "Perpetual Music" concert at the Staatsoper Unter den Linden in Berlin in September, featuring 14 singers and instrumentalists.

Engagements until the end of 2020 included solo concerts to open the season of the Würth Philharmoniker and the Antwerp Symphony Orchestra, the title role of Tosca at the Bayerische Staatsoper, the Season Inauguration Gala A Riveder le Stelle of the Teatro alla Scala and a Christmas concert hosted by the German president Frank-Walter Steinmeier and telecast by ZDF.

Sonya Yoncheva began the year 2021 starring in the Metropolitan Opera's "Met Stars Live in Concert" streaming concert series, which saw her singing arias and songs from the Schussenried Abbey in Germany. On French television, she appeared in "Fauteils d'Orchestre" on France 5, before embarking on a series of recitals and concerts throughout Spain, which brought her to Valencia, Bilbao and Madrid, where she performed her first Zarzuela concert at the Teatro de la Zarzuela. With the NOSPR led by her husband Domingo Hindoyan, Yoncheva sang Henri Duparc "L'Invitation Au Voyage" in Katowice, before starring in the title role of Tosca at the Wiener Staatsoper. In June, she took part in the Gala "Musiques en Fête" at the Chorégies d'Orange, telecast by France 3. Sonya Yoncheva's busy summer season also included Stephana in Umberto Giordano rarity Siberia at the Maggio Musicale in Florence, a production of La traviata at the Arena di Verona that was recorded for telecasts on ZDF and 3sat, recitals and concerts in Toulouse, Munich, Baden-Baden, Ljubljana, Montpellier, Sofia, Bucharest and the Salzburg Festival. In the Fall, she made her role debut as Puccini's Manon Lescaut at the Staatsoper Hamburg, returned to Zürich as Tosca, to the Staatsoper Unter den Linden as Mimi in La bohème and appeared in more solo concerts and recitals in Paris, Aarhus, Bucharest, Genève, Athens, Budapest, Barcelona, Moscow and at the Teatro alla Scala.

In January 2022, Sonya Yoncheva joined the very select rank of opera stars to have appeared in Recital at the Metropolitan Opera, presenting her program "Ad una Stella" with Malcolm Martineau, followed by performances as Élisabeth de Valois in the Met's first ever staging of Verdi's Don Carlos in five acts and in French. At the Festspielhaus Baden-Baden, Sonya Yoncheva performed the title role of Iolanta with the Berlin Philharmonic and Kirill Petrenko, at the Teatro Real of Madrid Stephana in Siberia, at the Gran Teatre del Liceu of Barcelona Norma, and at the Teatro alla Scala, she sang her first Fedora in a new production. In concert and recital, Sonya Yoncheva also appeared at the Gran Teatre del Liceu, at the Berliner Philharmonie, in Liverpool, Tokyo, Munich, Peralada, Versailles, Lyon and Munich.

The beginning of 2023 was marked by two title roles at the Metropolitan Opera, that of Fedora in a new production and of Norma. Sonya Yoncheva also returned to the Teatro alla Scala for her role debut as Maddalena in Andrea Chénier, to the Vienna State Opera to make her role debut as Madama Butterfly and to the Staatsoper Unter den Lindenas Médée. In the title role of Tosca, she appeared at the Arena of Verona, in Baden-Baden, Gstaad, Tokyo and Yokohama, while she appeared at the Bayerische Staatsoper as Madama Butterfly. Concerts and recitals led her to Montréal, Sofia, Düsseldorf, Salzburg, Baden-Baden, Varna, Tokyo, Buenos Aires, Montevideo, Bordeaux, Katowice, Berlin and Liverpool.

Sonya Yoncheva started the Puccini Year 2024 with performances of Madama Butterfly at the Staatsoper Unter den Linden in Berlin, a role she also performed at the Varna Summer Theatre and the Gran Teatre del Liceu of Barcelona. As Mimì in La Bohème, she appeared at the opera house of Sofia and in Varna, as Tosca at the Staatsoper Unter den Linden, the Roman theatre of Philippopolis, the Royal Opera House and the opera festival at the Baths of Caracalla in Rome. She also performed the title role of Norma at the Bavarian State Opera, Dido in Dido and Aeneas in Versailles, Toulouse, Madrid and Oviedo, as well as concerts and recitals in Caracas, Vienna, Muscat, Baden-Baden, Salzburg, Liverpool, La Grange au Lac, Tarbes, Perelada, Dubrovnik, São Paulo, Berlin, Paris, Toulouse, Compiègne, Dubai, Sofia and Versailles.

In 2025, Sonya appeared in three productions at the Wiener Staatsoper: Tosca, Andrea Chénier and a new production of Iolanta. She also made her role debut as Lisa in The Queen of Spades at the Metropolitan Opera, performed Dido in Dido and Aeneas at the Bayerische Staatsoper, Tosca and The Queen of Spades at the Varna Summer Theatre, Norma at the Menuhin Festival Gstaad and the Festspielhaus Baden-Baden, Tosca at the Opernhaus Zürich, and Andrea Chénier at the Metropolitan Opera. Sonya also appeared in solo concerts and recitals in Salzburg, Vienna, Zurich, Hamburg, Munich, Bucharest, Peralada, Dubrovnik, Pollenca, Santander, Gstaad, Rollé, and Auvers-sur-Oise.

== SY11 ==
In June 2020, Yoncheva announced the creation of her company SY11 at a gala concert organised by the company for August at the Roman Theatre of Plovdiv. This opening gala concert was followed by an important open air concert at the Alexander Nevsky Square in Sofia in 2021 starring Sonya Yoncheva and Plácido Domingo with Sofia Philharmonic and conductor Nayden Todorov, which was also live video streamed. Remaining an exclusive Sony Classical recording artist, Sonya Yoncheva and SY11 created an own record label in 2023, SY11 Productions, where the soprano released her latest album The Courtesan in February 2023. On SY11 Productions, Sonya Yoncheva also released her first book Fifteen Mirrors in 2023. Written by Alain Duault, Sonya Yoncheva speaks about 15 of her most important roles, accompanied with photos by Victor Santiago. The book is available in English, German, Bulgarian. In June 2023, Sonya Yoncheva and SY11 announced a recital series at the Bulgaria Hall of Sofia. The first season features singers such as Freddie De Tommaso, Jakub Józef Orliński, Fatma Said, Elsa Dreisig, Clémentine Margaine and Yoncheva herself. In October 2025, Sonya Yoncheva and SY11 co-hosted and co-organised the Operalia Competition in Sofia. Sonya also served as a jury member.

== Awards and honors ==
Yoncheva is a Rolex Ambassador and was named Officière de l’ordre de Arts et des lettres of France in 2024. Also in 2024 she was awarded by the Minister of the Culture of Bulgaria with the “Golden Century” award for persons who achieved exceptionally high creative results or for exceptionally great merits for the development and popularization of Bulgarian culture and art. She was medici.tv's 2017 Artist of the Year. She is also the winner of the 2019 Readers Award of the International Opera Awards. In 2021, Sonya Yoncheva received a number of honors: she was named honorary citizen of her hometown Plovdiv and received Germany's most important classical music award Opus Klassik as "Singer of the Year" for her solo album "Rebirth". In 2023, Sonya Yoncheva received the title of Doctor Honoris Causa from the Academy of Music, Dance and Visual Arts of her native town of Plovdiv. She won a Young Artist of the Year award (Nachwuchskünstler/-in des Jahres) in 2015 Echo Klassik. In 2016, she was awarded the Order of Saints Cyril and Methodius for her "contribution to the field of art". She was one of the recipients of the 13th annual Opera News Awards. She was presented Award of the Year from the Círculo Críticos de Arte de Chile for her recital at the Teatro del Lago. Sonya Yoncheva also was a UNICEF Ambassador for Bulgaria, standing up for the rights of children.

== Personal life ==
Yoncheva married Venezuelan conductor Domingo Hindoyan in July 2014 and they live in the Canton of Vaud, Switzerland. The couple have a son, Mateo, born 6 October 2014. In October 2019, their daughter Sophia was born. Her younger brother Marin Yonchev is a former rock singer, who became an opera singer in 2010.

== Discography ==
Yoncheva is featured on commercial audio recordings on the Virgin Classics label. In November 2013, she signed a recording contract with Sony Classical and has released several solo CDs including:

- 2015: Paris, mon amour, Orquestra de la Comunitat Valenciana conducted by Frédéric Chaslin (Sony)
- 2017: Handel, Academia Montis Regalis, Alessandro De Marchi (conductor) (Sony)
- 2018: The Verdi Album, Münchner Rundfunkorchester conducted by Massimo Zanetti (Sony)
- 2021: Rebirth, Cappella Mediterranea conducted by Leonardo García Alarcó (Sony)
- 2023: The Courtesan, Orchestra of the Teatro Carlo Felice, conducted by Marco Armiliato (SY11 Productions)
- 2025: “ GEORGE”, Olga Zado (SY11 Productions) (Naïve Records)

On video she appears in DVD releases of Monteverdi's L'incoronazione di Poppea and Il ritorno d'Ulisse in patria, and of Pergolesi's Il Flaminio. Additionally, she is featured on Pergolesi's "Stabat Mater" and Mozart's "Le Nozze di Figaro" on Deutsche Grammophon. In March 2024, a Pentatone (record label) CD of Yoncheva singing Gustav Mahler's Rückert-Lieder was released.Pentatone website listing CD including "Rückert-Lieder" She can be seen as Desdemona in the Met Opera's HD streaming video of Otello (2015). In 2016, she sang the season opener of Bellini's Norma, issued on DVD by Opus Arte. On DVD/Blu-Ray, she can also be seen on recordings of La bohème and Les Contes d'Hoffmann from the Royal Opera House Covent Garden, Iolanta from Paris Opera, Siberia from the Maggio Musicale Fiorentino, conducted by Gianandrea Noseda and in the ZDF Adventskonzert 2015 from Dresden.

== Documentary ==
- Sonya Yoncheva: Sempre Libera (2018). directed by Ema Konstantinova and Georgi Toshev. premiered at the 32nd Kinomania Film Festival in Sofia on 26 November 2018.
- Sonya Yoncheva: Gala in Sofia (2024). directed by Ema Konstantinova. Premiered at the Master of Art Festival in Sofia on 2 March 2024.
