= 2009 Czech Presidency of the Council of the European Union =

Presidency of the Council of the European Union

Czech Presidency of the Council of the European Union

- Logo of the 2009 Czech presidency 1 January – 30 June 2009
- Council of the European Union

Presidency trio
- France; Czech Republic; Sweden

The first Czech Presidency of the Council of the European Union (or Czech Presidency of EU) occurred in the first half of 2009. On 1 January 2009, Czech Prime Minister Mirek Topolánek became the President of the Council of the European Union. When Topolánek's cabinet lost a vote of no-confidence, he was replaced by Jan Fischer on 8 May 2009. The Presidency passed to Sweden on 1 July 2009. The second Czech presidency occurred in the January-June 2022 period.

== Priorities ==
Priorities had been formulated since 2007. It included Energetics, countries of Eastern Europe and elections of European offices. Important priorities were three Big E - Economics, Energetics and Europe in the world. The presidency's aim was to stabilize the European economic situation following the 2008 financial crisis.

== History ==
The Czech Republic took over the presidency on 1 January 2009. Czech presidency had to deal with the Russia–Ukraine gas dispute. Topolánek's team was able to negotiate a compromise between Russia and Ukraine.

Another important moment was a conflict in Gaza. Karel Schwarzenberg, the Czech Minister of Foreign Affairs, led a team which participated in peace negotiations.

A summit of European ministers of Labour and Social Affairs took place in Luhačovice from 22 to 24 January.

Presidency focused on economical matters during February. Topolánek summoned summit to Brussels for 19 and 20 March 2009. Summit discussed unemployment and Changes of climate. Another summit was held in Hluboká. European Ministers of Foreign Affairs met with Karel Schwarzenberg. Summit was met with protests against Nuclear power plant in Temelín, against American Radar in the Czech Republic and against European Union.

On 24 March 2009, the Czech government lost vote of no-confidence. European Commission stated that it had confidence in the Czech Republic, and that the nation's EU presidency would remain unaffected.Topolánek stated that the collapse of his cabinet will have "no impact" on the Czech presidency.

During April, Czech presidency held many meetings with international organisations such as North Atlantic Treaty Organization or G20. American president Barack Obama Prague. Jan Fischer remained president of European Council until 1 July 2009.

== Entropa ==
Entropa is a sculpture by Czech artist David Černý. The project was commissioned by the Czech Republic to mark the occasion of the presidency, and was originally designed as a collaboration for 27 artists and artist groups from all member countries of the European Union. However, as a hoax, Černý and three of his assistants created a satirical and controversial piece that depicted pointed stereotypes of the EU member nations. Fake artist profiles were also created by Černý and his accomplices, complete with invented descriptions of their supposed contributions.

== Reception ==
Czech government called the presidency a success. Czech presidency was praised for many successes such as resolution of Gas crisis or support of renewable energy sources. The most critical point was fall of Topolánek's government.

According to poll in July 2009, 54% considered the Presidency successful while 36% unsuccessful.
