= 2018 =

2018 in various calendars
- Gregorian calendar: 2018; MMXVIII
- Ab urbe condita: 2771
- Armenian calendar: 1467; ԹՎ ՌՆԿԷ
- Assyrian calendar: 6768
- Baháʼí calendar: 174–175
- Balinese saka calendar: 1939–1940
- Bengali calendar: 1424–1425
- Berber calendar: 2968
- British Regnal year: 66 Eliz. 2 – 67 Eliz. 2
- Buddhist calendar: 2562
- Burmese calendar: 1380
- Byzantine calendar: 7526–7527
- Chinese calendar: 丁酉年 (Fire Rooster); 4715 or 4508 — to — 戊戌年 (Earth Dog); 4716 or 4509
- Coptic calendar: 1734–1735
- Discordian calendar: 3184
- Ethiopian calendar: 2010–2011
- Hebrew calendar: 5778–5779
- Hindu calendars
- Vikram Samvat: 2074–2075
- Shaka Samvat: 1939–1940
- Kali Yuga: 5118–5119
- Holocene calendar: 12018
- Igbo calendar: 1018–1019
- Iranian calendar: 1396–1397
- Islamic calendar: 1439–1440
- Japanese calendar: Heisei 30 (平成３０年)
- Javanese calendar: 1951–1952
- Juche calendar: 107
- Julian calendar: Gregorian minus 13 days
- Korean calendar: 4351
- Minguo calendar: ROC 107 民國107年
- Nanakshahi calendar: 550
- Thai solar calendar: 2561
- Tibetan calendar: མེ་མོ་བྱ་ལོ་ (female Fire-Bird); 2144 or 1763 or 991 — to — ས་ཕོ་ཁྱི་ལོ་ (male Earth-Dog); 2145 or 1764 or 992
- Unix time: 1514764800 – 1546300799

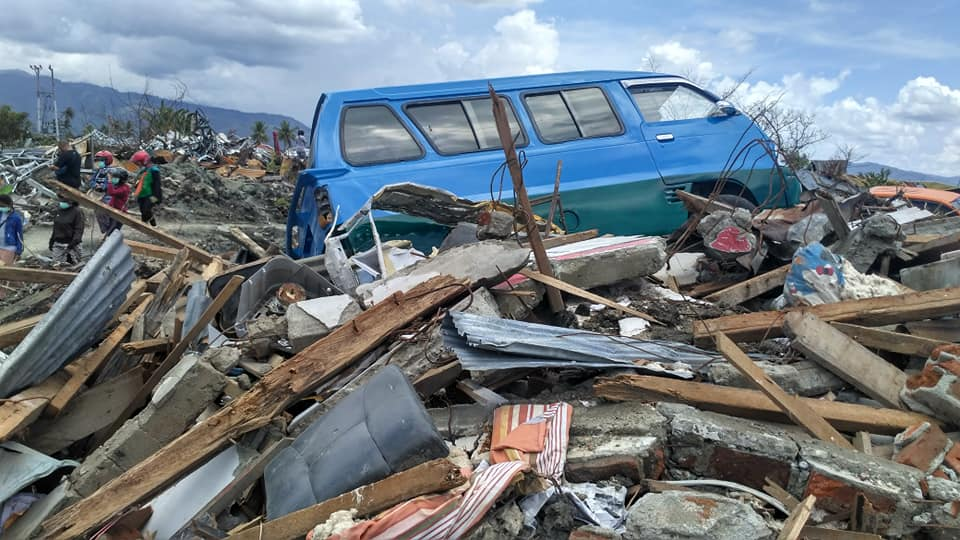
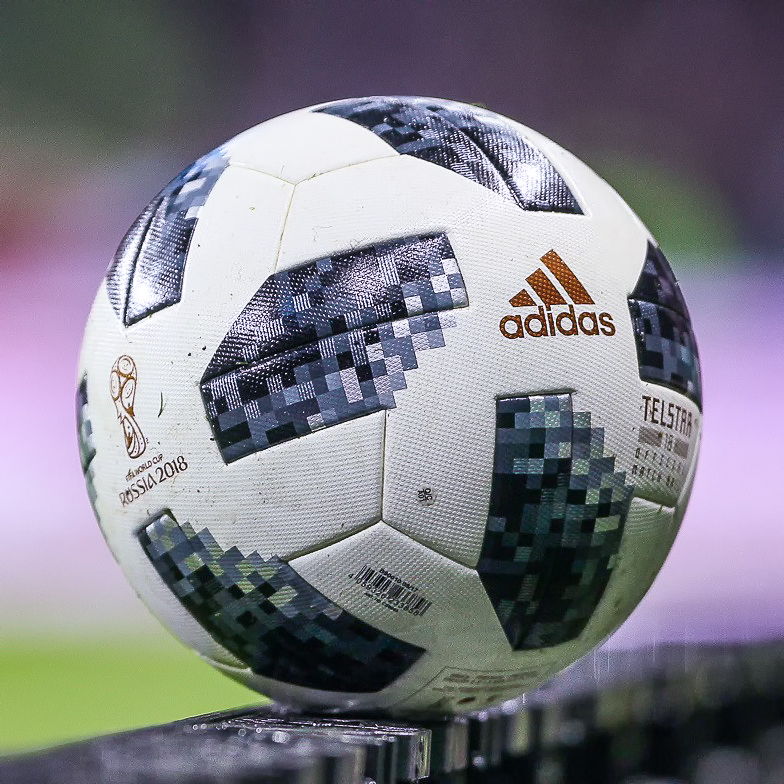
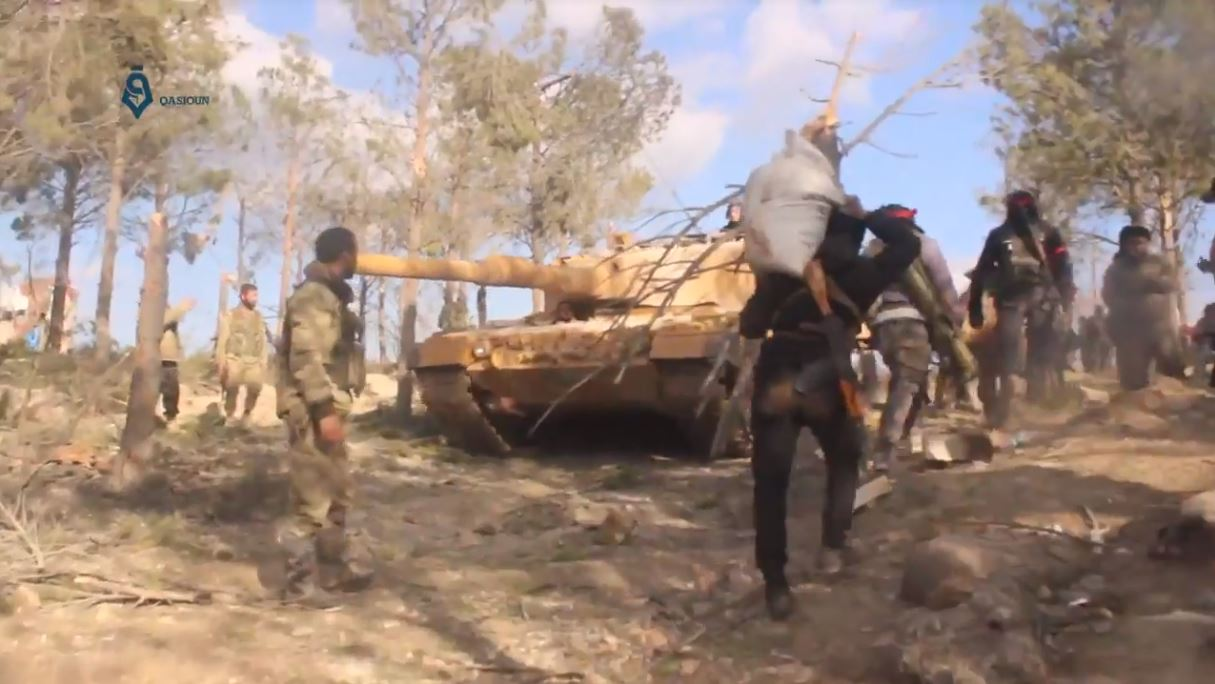
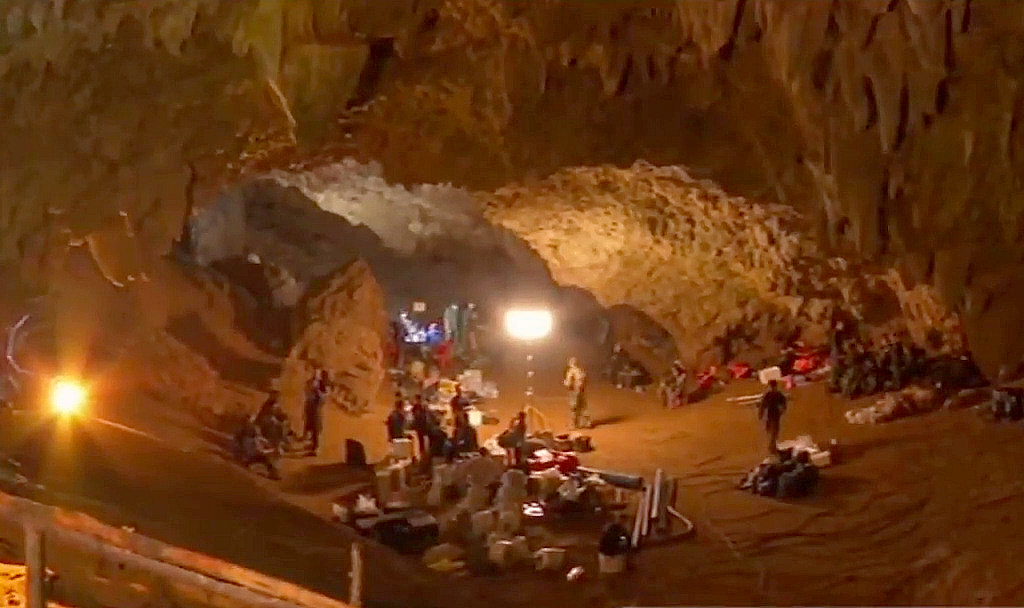
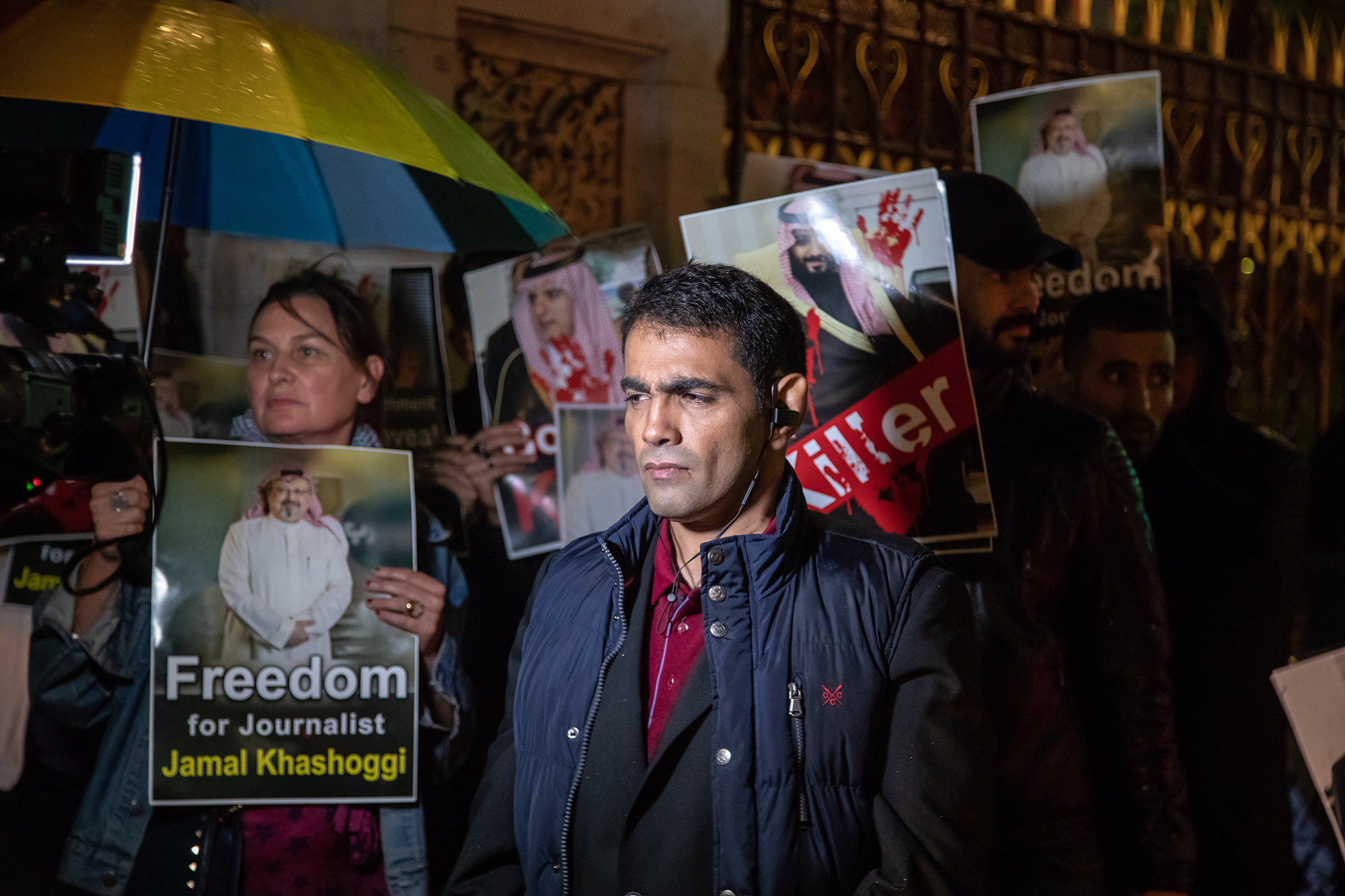
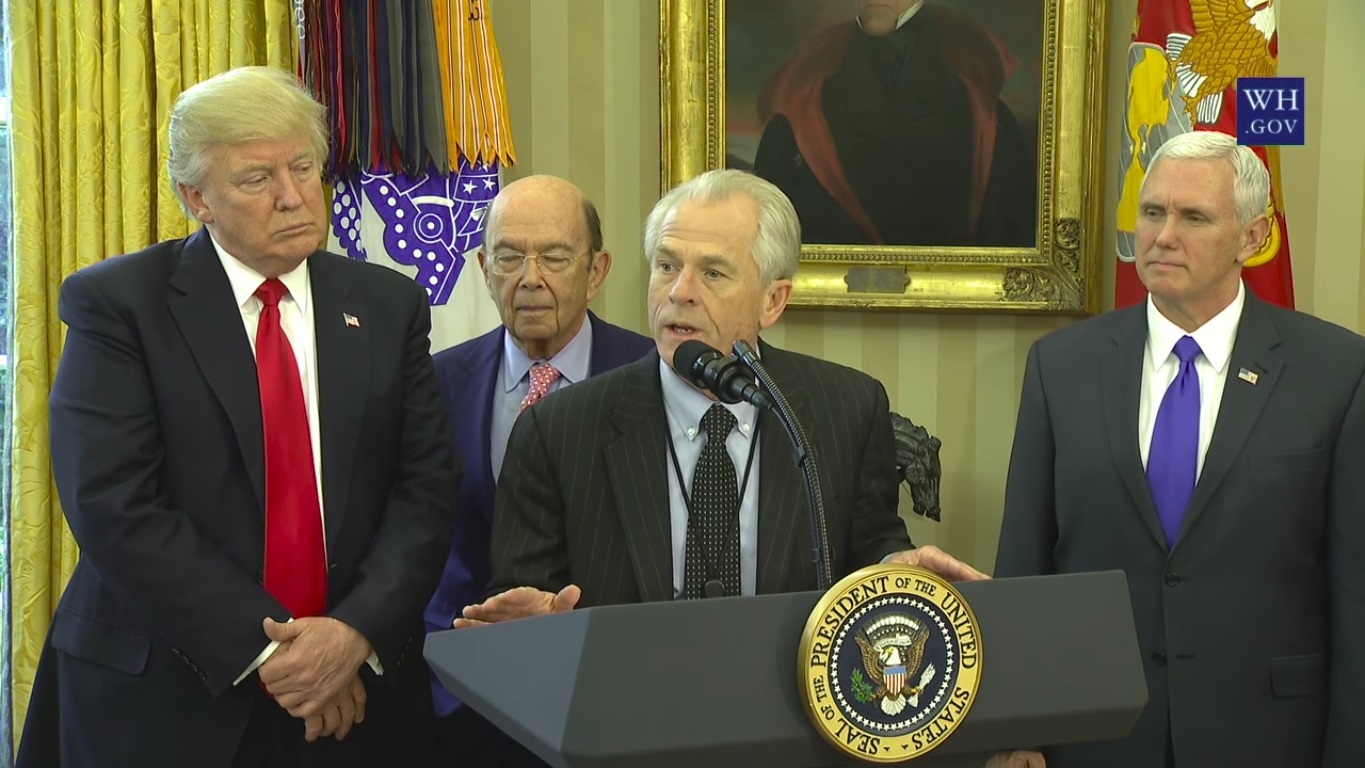
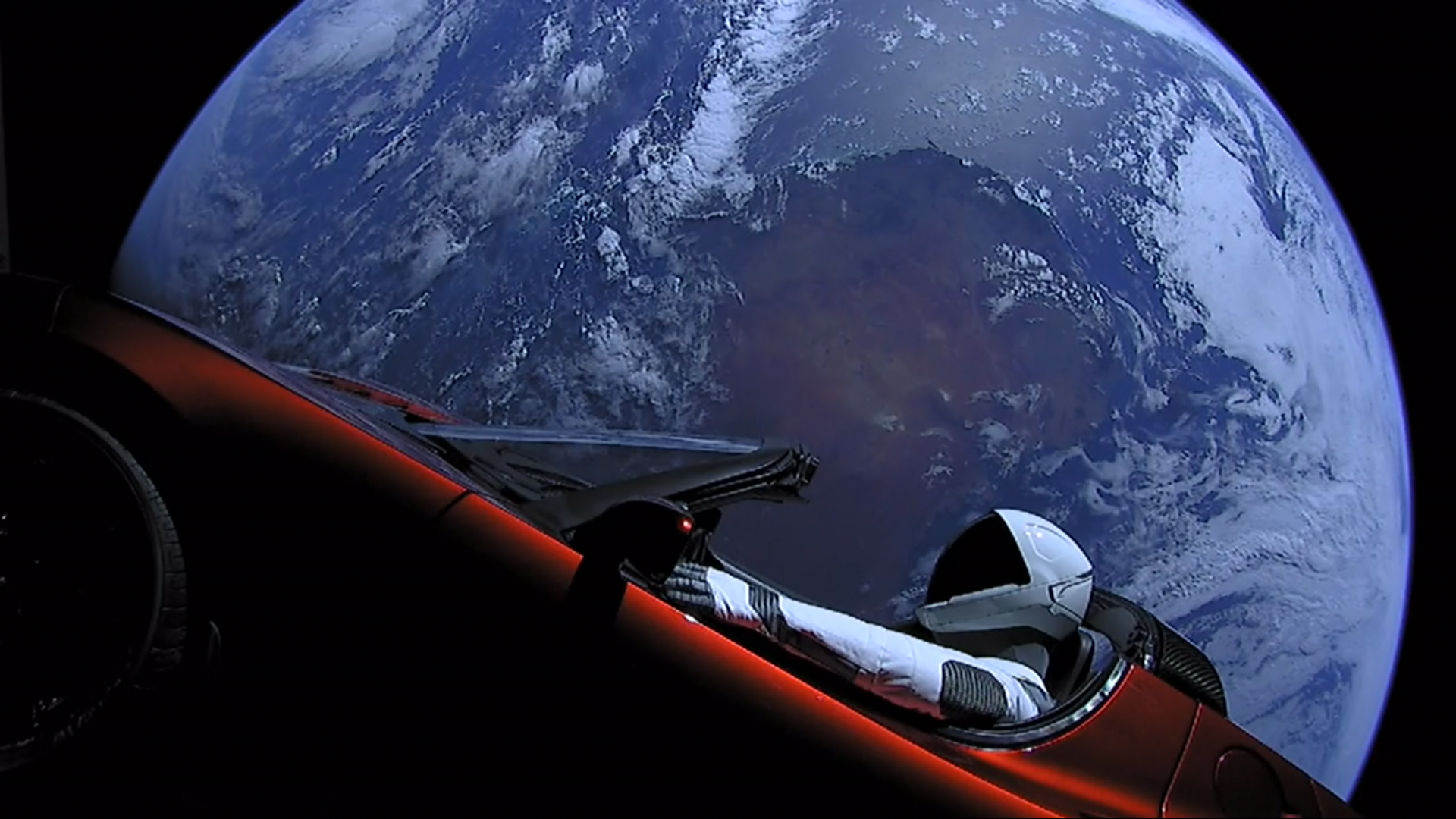
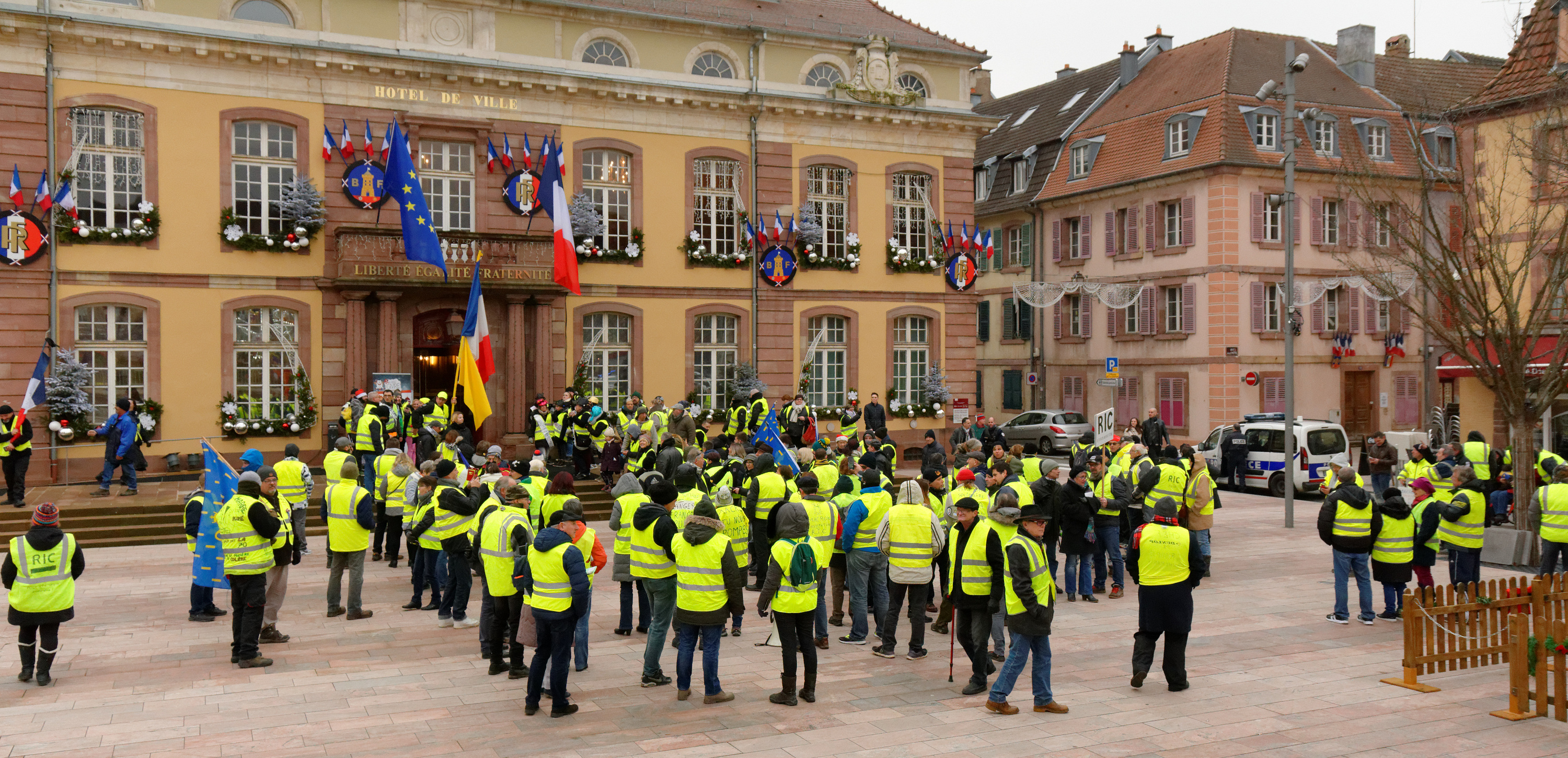
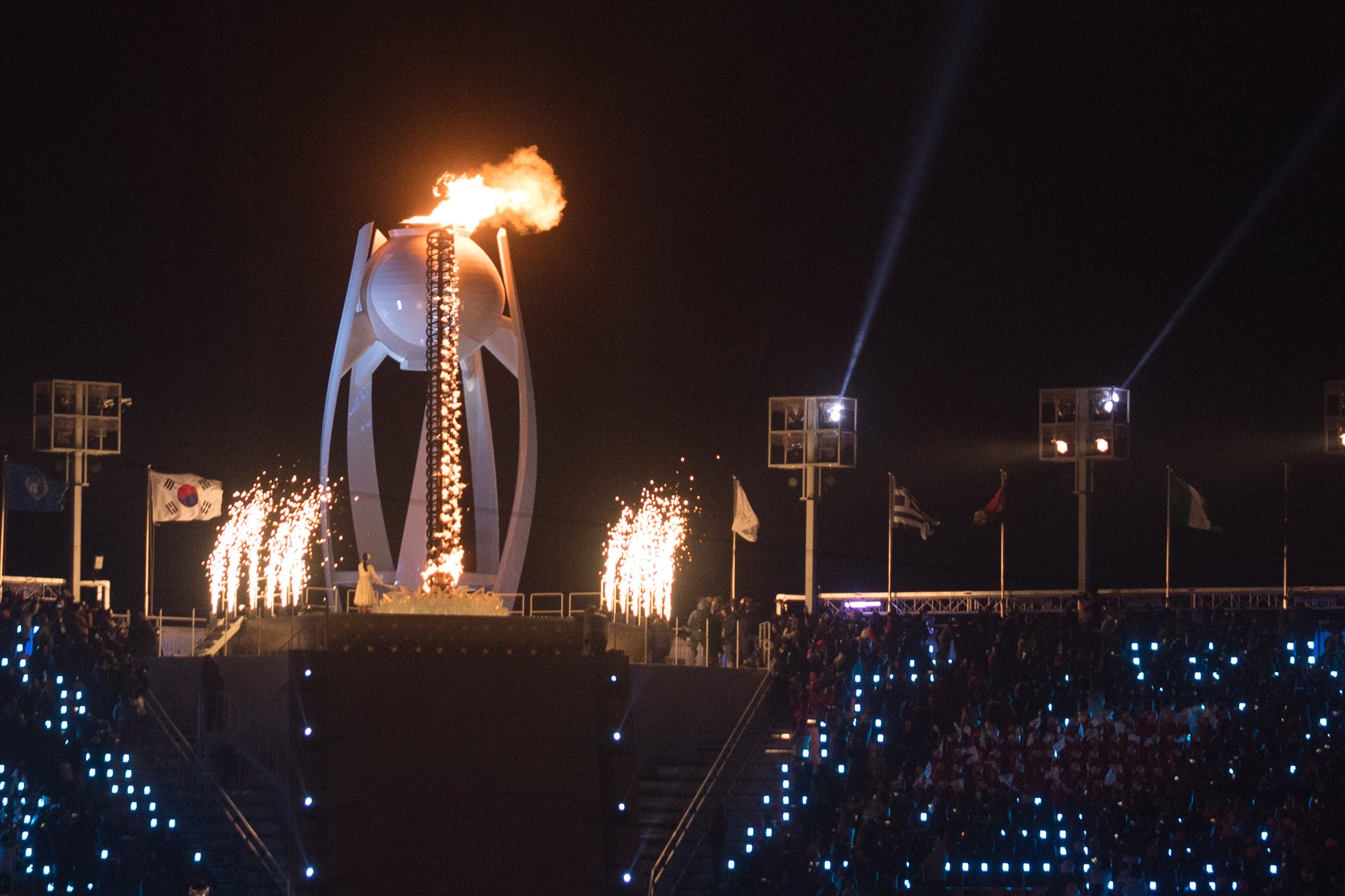
From left to right, top to bottom:
- An earthquake and tsunami in Sulawesi kills 4,340;
- The 2018 FIFA World Cup was held in Russia and was won by France;
- Operation Olive Branch was a Turkish military incursion into the Afrin region of Syria;
- The Tham Luang cave rescue was a rescue of an association football team who got stuck in the cave situated in Thailand; 2 of the rescuers died as a result of flooding there;
- Protests occur following the assassination of Jamal Khashoggi;
- The US-China trade war is an ongoing period of economic conflict initiated by the United States, primarily through the imposition of tariffs on Chinese goods;
- Elon Musk launched his personal Tesla Roadster into space as a dummy payload for the Falcon Heavy test flight.
- Yellow vests protests occur in France due to the increasing price of crude oil;
- The 2018 Winter Olympics were held in Pyeongchang, South Korea.

2018 (MMXVIII) was a common year starting on Monday of the Gregorian calendar, the 2018th year of the Common Era (CE) and Anno Domini (AD) designations, the 18th year of the 3rd millennium and the 21st century, and the 9th year of the 2010s decade.

== Events ==
=== January ===
- January 1 – Bulgaria takes over the Presidency of the Council of the European Union, after the Estonian presidency.
- January 4 – SPLM-IO rebels loyal to Chan Garang Lual start a raid against Juba, capital of South Sudan.
- January 12–13 – The first round of voting in the 2018 Czech presidential election is held.
- January 13 — At 8:08 AM HST, an inbound missile alert was accidentally issued via the Emergency Alert System and Wireless Emergency Alert System over television, radio, and cellular networks in the U.S. state of Hawaii. 38 minutes later, the alert was confirmed as false by state officials, and blamed a miscommunicated drill at the HI-EMA.
- January 20 – Turkey, led by President Recep Tayyip Erdoğan, announces the beginning of a military offensive to capture a portion of northern Syria from Kurdish forces, amidst the ongoing Kurdish–Turkish conflict.
- January 20–22 – The US government enters a federal government shutdown as a result of a dispute over Deferred Action for Childhood Arrivals.
- January 24 – Scientists in China report in the journal Cell the creation of the first monkey clones using somatic cell nuclear transfer, named Zhong Zhong and Hua Hua.
- January 26–27 – The second round of voting of the 2018 Czech presidential election is held and incumbent president Miloš Zeman is reelected.
- January 28
  - 2018 Finnish presidential election: Incumbent president Sauli Niinistö is reelected on the first round of voting.
  - The first round of voting of the 2018 Cypriot presidential election is held.
- January 31 – A total lunar eclipse takes place, the 49th eclipse of Lunar Saros 124. This was referred to by the media as a 'super blue blood moon' as it was close to a supermoon, with perigee being on January 30, and a blue moon eclipse, the first since 1982.

=== February ===
- February 4
  - The second round of voting of the 2018 Cypriot presidential election is held and incumbent president Nicos Anastasiades is reelected.
  - 2018 Costa Rican general election: The first round of voting of the presidential election and legislative election are held.
- February 6 – SpaceX successfully conducts its maiden flight of its most powerful rocket to date, the Falcon Heavy, from LC39A at John F. Kennedy Space Center in Florida.
- February 9–25 – The 2018 Winter Olympics are held in Pyeongchang, South Korea.
- February 10 – Kay Goldsworthy becomes the first female archbishop in the Anglican Communion on her installation in the Anglican Diocese of Perth, Western Australia.
- February 11 – 2018 Monegasque general election: The Priorité Monaco party, led by Stéphane Valeri, won 21 out of the 24 seats in the National Council.
- February 14
  - Jacob Zuma resigns as President of South Africa after nine years in power.
  - A shooting at Marjory Stoneman Douglas High School in Parkland, Florida is one of the deadliest school massacres with 17 fatalities and 17 injuries.
- February 18 – Kizlyar church shooting: a man carrying a knife and a double-barreled shotgun opens fire on a crowd at an Orthodox church in Kizlyar, Dagestan, killing five women and injuring several other people; the perpetrator is shot and killed by police.

=== March ===
- March 4
  - Former Russian double agent Sergei Skripal and his daughter, Yulia, are poisoned by the Novichok nerve agent in Salisbury, England. UK counter-terrorism police investigate amid speculation the Kremlin was behind the incident.
  - The 2018 Salvadoran legislative election is held to elect all 84 members of the Legislative Assembly of El Salvador.
  - The 2018 Italian general election is held to elect all 315 members of the Senate of the Republic and all 630 members of the Chamber of Deputies.
- March 6 – 2018 Russian Air Force Antonov An-26 crash: An Antonov An-26 transport aircraft operated by the Russian Air Force crashes on approach to Khmeimim air base in Syria, killing all 39 people on board. All of them were servicemen of the Russian Armed Forces, including Major-General Vladimir Yeremeyev.
- March 9–18 – The 2018 Winter Paralympics are held in Pyeongchang, South Korea.
- March 9
  - President of the United States Donald Trump accepts an invitation from North Korean leader Kim Jong Un for a meeting in May to discuss the denuclearisation of North Korea.
  - Princess Latifa bint Mohammed Al Maktoum, a UAE princess, escaped Dubai with a group of other people. She was arrested by Indian and UAE authorities, a few kilometers off the coast of India. She was then taken back to the UAE.
- March 11
  - China's government approves a constitutional change that removes term limits for its leaders, granting Xi Jinping the status of "President for Life". Xi is also the General Secretary of the Chinese Communist Party (paramount leader).
  - The 2018 Colombian parliamentary election is held to elect all 102 members of the Senate of Colombia and all 165 members of the House of Representatives of Colombia.
- March 12 – Flight BS211 crashes and bursts into flames at Tribhuvan International Airport, Nepal, killing 51 of the 71 people aboard. The 20 surviving passengers were seriously injured from the impact and the fire.
- March 13 – The 2018 Grenadian general election is held to elect all 15 members of the House of Representatives of Grenada, the lower chamber of the Parliament of Grenada and the New National Party won all 15 seats for the second consecutive time.
- March 14 – In response to gun violence in the United States, and particularly triggered by the Stoneman Douglas High School shooting in Parkland, Florida, thousands of high school students across the country participate in an organized protest they called the National School Walkout.
- March 18 – In the Russian presidential election, Vladimir Putin is elected for a fourth term.
- March 19 – The world's last male northern white rhinoceros dies in Kenya, making the subspecies functionally extinct.
- March 21 – The 2018 Antiguan general election is held to elect all 17 members of the House of Representatives of Antigua and Barbuda, the lower chamber of the Parliament of Antigua and Barbuda and the governing Antigua and Barbuda Labour Party win 15 out of 17 seats.
- March 23 – An Islamic terrorist attack in Carcassonne and Trèbes, France, kills five people, including the perpetrator.
- March 24 – In over 900 cities internationally, people participate in demonstrations against gun violence and mass shootings, calling for stronger gun control in the "March for Our Lives".
- March 25
  - Qantas launches direct non-stop Boeing 787 Dreamliner flights between Perth Airport and Heathrow Airport, making it the first commercially non-stop service between Australia and the United Kingdom.
  - 2018 Kemerovo fire: At least 60 people are killed and 79 others injured in a fire at the Winter Cherry shopping mall and entertainment complex in Kemerovo, Russia.
- March 26 – More than 100 Russian diplomats are expelled by more than 20 countries in the wake of the poisoning of Sergei and Yulia Skripal.
- March 28
  - North Korean supreme leader Kim Jong Un meets Chinese paramount leader Xi Jinping, leaving the country for the first time since assuming office in 2011.
  - At least 78 people die in a fire in the police headquarters of Valencia, Venezuela.

=== April ===
- April 1 – 2018 Costa Rican general election: The second round of voting for the presidential election is held and Citizens' Action Party candidate Carlos Alvarado Quesada is elected president.
- April 4–15 – The 2018 Commonwealth Games are held in Gold Coast, Queensland, Australia.
- April 5 – Agents with the U.S. Immigration and Customs Enforcement raid a slaughterhouse in Tennessee, detaining nearly 100 undocumented Hispanic workers in one of the largest immigration raids in the history of the U.S., prompting protests and federal lawsuits.
- April 6 – A semi-truck collides with a bus carrying the Humboldt Broncos ice hockey junior team in Saskatchewan, Canada, killing 16 and injuring 13 people.
- April 7 – 2018 Münster attack: In a suicide attack, a man drives a van into people seated outside restaurants in a pedestrianised square in the old part of the German city of Münster, resulting in 5 other deaths.
- April 8
  - Syrian Civil War: At least 70 people are reported to have died and hundreds suffering injuries after a chlorine chemical attack in Douma, the last rebel-held town in Syria's Eastern Ghouta.
  - The 2018 Hungarian parliamentary election is held to elect all 199 members of the National Assembly of Hungary and the Fidesz–KDNP Party Alliance won 133 out of 199 seats.
- April 11 – 257 people are killed after an Ilyushin Il-76 belonging to the Algerian Air Force crashes near Algiers.
- April 14 – Syrian Civil War: The United States, the United Kingdom and France order the bombing of Syrian military bases in response to the sarin attack allegedly by the Bashar al-Assad regime on civilians in Ghouta.
- April 15 – The 2018 Montenegrin presidential election is held and the Democratic Party of Socialists of Montenegro candidate, former prime minister and former president Milo Đukanović is elected on the first round of voting.
- April 18
  - In Nicaragua, protests begin against announced reforms of Social Security which would decrease retirement pension benefits. An estimated number of 34 protesters are killed by police.
  - Cinemas open in Saudi Arabia for the first time since 1983 with the American film Black Panther chosen as the first to be screened.
  - NASA's Transiting Exoplanet Survey Satellite (TESS) is launched.
- April 19
  - Miguel Díaz-Canel is sworn in as President of Cuba, replacing Raúl Castro, but Castro remains the First Secretary of the Communist Party of Cuba, the most powerful position in Cuba.
  - Swaziland changes its English name, officially becoming the Kingdom of Eswatini.
- April 20 – The 2018 Bhutanese National Council election is held to elect 20 out of 25 members of the National Council of Bhutan, the upper house of the bicameral Parliament of Bhutan.
- April 21 – Nabi Tajima (1900 – 2018), the last known person born in the 19th century dies.
- April 22 – The 2018 Paraguayan general election is held to elect the president of Paraguay, all 45 members of the Chamber of Senators of Paraguay and all 80 members of the Chamber of Deputies of Paraguay. Colorado Party candidate Mario Abdo Benítez is elected president, the Colorado Party wins 17 out of 45 seats in the Chamber of Senators and 42 out of 80 members in the Chamber of Deputies.
- April 23 – A vehicle-ramming attack kills 10 people and injures 16 others in Toronto, Canada. A 25-year-old suspect, Alek Minassian, is arrested.
- April 27 – 2018-19 Korean peace process: Kim Jong Un crosses into South Korea to meet with President Moon Jae-in, becoming the first North Korean leader to cross the Demilitarized Zone since its creation in 1953.

=== May ===
- May 3
  - The separatist group ETA officially announces its final dissolution after 40 years of conflict and more than 800 deaths in Spain.
  - The 2018 lower Puna eruption causes destruction of structures and forces thousands of residents of Hawaii to evacuate as lava floods the land.
- May 5
  - NASA's space probe InSight is launched. It landed on Mars on November 26 and uses a drill to conduct geological science.
  - In North Korea, clocks are adjusted to UTC+9 (GMT+09:00) to the same as South Korea
- May 8 – U.S. President Donald Trump announces his intention to withdraw the United States from the Iranian nuclear agreement.
- May 8–12 – The Eurovision Song Contest 2018 is held in Lisbon, Portugal, and is won by Israeli entrant Netta Barzilai with the song "Toy".
- May 9 – The opposition-led Pakatan Harapan coalition, led by former Prime Minister Mahathir Mohamad, secures a parliamentary majority in the Malaysian Parliament as the result of the 2018 Malaysian general election, ending the 61-year rule of the Barisan Nasional coalition since independence in 1957.
- May 12 – The 2018 East Timorese parliamentary election is held to elect all 65 members of the National Parliament of East Timor and the Alliance for Change and Progress (CNRT–PLP–KHUNTO) wins 34 out of 65 seats.
- May 16 – The Yang di-Pertuan Agong, Sultan Muhammad V, pardons Malaysian opposition leader Anwar Ibrahim who is immediately released.
- May 18 – Cubana de Aviación Flight 972 crashed shortly after take-off near José Martí International Airport in Havana, Cuba, killing 112 people and leaving only one survivor.
- May 19 – The wedding of Prince Harry and Meghan Markle was held at St George's Chapel, Windsor, with an estimated global audience of 1.9 billion.
- May 20 – The 2018 Venezuelan presidential election was held with incumbent President Nicolás Maduro reelected with 67.8% of the vote and the lowest turnout in Venezuela's modern democratic history since the 1958 coup d'état. The elections were denounced as a "sham" by several Latin American countries, the United States, Canada, the Organization of American States and the European Union.
- May 24
  - Foreign journalists report that tunnels in the Punggye-ri nuclear test site have been destroyed by the North Korean government in a move to reduce regional tensions.
  - The 2018 Barbadian general election is held to elect all 30 members of the House of Assembly of Barbados, the lower house of the bicameral Parliament of Barbados and the Barbados Labour Party wins all 30 seats.
- May 25
  - The European Union's General Data Protection Regulation (GDPR) goes into effect, imposing strict privacy controls for European citizens worldwide.
  - A constitutional referendum on whether to repeal the ban on abortion in Ireland takes place, with a landslide win of 66.4% to 33.6% for the repeal side.
- May 26 – Real Madrid wins the 2017-18 Champions League held in Kyiv, Ukraine by beating Liverpool in the final 3–1.
- May 27 – The first round of voting of the 2018 Colombian presidential election is held.
- May 28–June 7 – The 2018 Stanley Cup Final are played between the Washington Capitals and the Vegas Golden Knights and won by the former.
- May 31 – The U.S. announces that it will extend its tariffs on imported steel (25%) and aluminium (10%) to include the EU, Mexico and Canada, starting at midnight.

=== June ===
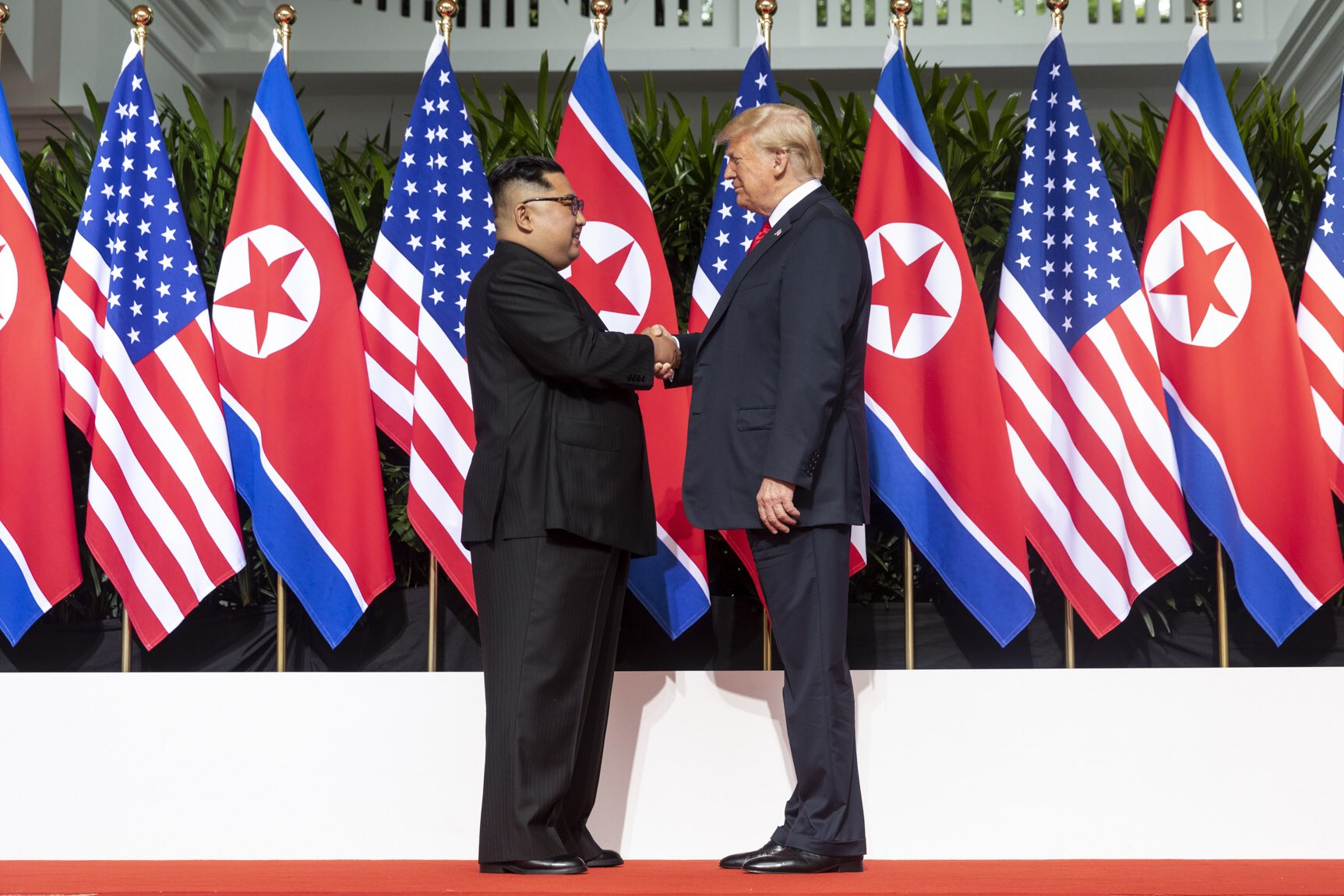
Leaders of North Korea and the United States met for the first time at the Singapore Summit

- June 1 – Giuseppe Conte becomes the new Prime Minister of Italy, leading a cabinet described as the "first modern populist government in Western Europe".
- June 2 – Pedro Sánchez is appointed new Prime Minister of Spain, a day after a vote of no confidence against his predecessor, Mariano Rajoy.
- June 3
  - At least 109 people are killed and hundreds wounded by the eruption of Volcán de Fuego, Guatemala's deadliest volcanic eruption in over a century.
  - Snap parliamentary elections are held in Slovenia, following the resignation of prime minister Miro Cerar, to elect all 90 members of the National Assembly of Slovenia, the lower house of the Slovenian Parliament.
- June 8–9 – The 44th G7 summit is held in Canada. President Trump pushes for the reinstatement of the G8 (to include Russia). He also proposes the elimination of tariffs.
- June 12
  - The 2018 North Korea–United States summit is held in Singapore. It is the first summit between a sitting United States President and a North Korean leader.
  - Greece and the Republic of Macedonia reach a deal to end a 27-year naming dispute between both countries, which would result in Macedonia being officially renamed the Republic of North Macedonia.
- June 13 – FIFA awards hosting rights for the 2026 World Cup to a joint bid from Canada, Mexico and the United States.
- June 14–July 15 – The 2018 FIFA World Cup is held in Russia and is won by France.
- June 16
  - Seventeen people die in Caracas, Venezuela following the El Paraíso stampede after a tear gas canister is detonated in a crowded club.
- June 17 – The second round of voting of the 2018 Colombian presidential election is held and Iván Duque is elected.
- June 18 – 20-year old American rapper and singer-songwriter XXXTentacion was murdered in Deerfield Beach, Florida during an armed robbery.
- June 19
  - The United States announces it will withdraw from the United Nations Human Rights Council.
  - Canada becomes the first major industrialised country to legalise cannabis for recreational use. The Bill which legalises cannabis took effect on October 17.
- June 20 – After widespread criticism, US President Donald Trump signs an executive order suspending his zero-tolerance family separation policies, though thousands of undocumented children were never reunited with their families even after the policy was suspended.
- June 22–July 1 – The 2018 Mediterranean Games are held in Tarragona, Spain.
- June 24
  - Saudi Arabia allows women to drive.
  - Early general elections was held in Turkey to elect the president of Turkey and all 600 members of the Grand National Assembly of Turkey, Turkey's unicameral legislature. Justice and Development Party candidate, incumbent president Recep Tayyip Erdoğan is reelected and the Justice and Development Party, led by Recep Tayyip Erdoğan comes out as the largest party winning 295 out of 600 seats.
- June 30 – Millions of people marched to protest the Trump administration's zero-tolerance policy towards illegal migrants. This march was devoted to reuniting refugee and immigrant families that were separated at the US–Mexico border by the US government's policy introduced in the spring of 2018.

=== July ===
- July 1
  - Austria takes over the Presidency of the Council of the European Union, after the Bulgarian presidency.
  - The 2018 Mexican general election is held to elect the president of Mexico, all 128 members of the Senate of the Republic and all 500 members of the Chamber of Deputies.The presidential candidate of the Juntos Haremos Historia coalition, Andrés Manuel López Obrador is elected president and the Juntos Haremos Historia coalition wins a majority of 69 out of 128 out of seats in the Senate and 312 out of 500 seats in the Chamber of Deputies.
- July 5
  - Lithuania becomes the 36th member of the OECD.
  - The 2018 North American heat wave takes place, killing 33 people in the Canadian province of Quebec.
- July 6
  - Former Aum Shinrikyo leader Shoko Asahara and six other main members of Aum Shinrikyo, who led the 1995 Tokyo subway sarin attack, are executed by hanging.
  - China–United States trade war: U.S. tariffs on US$34 billion of Chinese goods come into effect, as President Trump suggests the final total could reach $550bn. China accuses the U.S. of starting the "largest trade war in economic history" and announces immediate retaliatory tariffs.
- July 7 – 2018 Japan floods, a torrential heavy massive rain, flash flood, landslide hit in Hiroshima, Kurashiki and Ehime Prefecture, Japan. According to Japanese government official confirmed report, 232 people were killed and 459 injured.
- July 9 – Eritrea and Ethiopia officially declare an end to their twenty-year conflict.
- July 10 – Twelve boys and their football coach are successfully rescued from the flooded Tham Luang Nang Non cave in Thailand, following a 17-day ordeal that gained worldwide attention. One person, a law enforcement officer is killed.
- July 11–12 – The 2018 Brussels NATO summit is held in Belgium.
- July 15 – France national football team wins the 2018 FIFA World Cup final 4–2 against the Croatia national football team
- July 17 – The EU–Japan Economic Partnership Agreement is signed, the world's largest bilateral free trade deal, creating an open trade zone covering nearly one-third of global GDP.
- July 20 – Prime Minister, Narendra Modi wins a no confidence motion in the Lok Sabha moved by the opposition.
- July 23 – The Saddle Dam D in Paksong, Laos collapses leaving up to 1,100 people missing.
- July 25 – Scientists report the presence of a subglacial lake on Mars, 1.5 km (0.93 mi) below the southern polar ice cap and extending sideways about 20 km (12 mi), the first known body of water on the planet.
- July 26
  - Heavy wildfires in Greece leave 102 dead and more than a hundred buildings destroyed.
  - The share price of Facebook drops by almost 20 percent after the company warns investors that user growth has slowed following the data leak scandal. Over $109 billion is wiped from its market value, the largest single day loss in corporate history at the time.
- July 27 – The longest total lunar eclipse of the 21st century occurs, lasting 102 minutes and 57.3 seconds, but the longest total lunar eclipse of the 3rd millennium will occur on May 12, 2264, lasting 106 minutes and 13.2 seconds, over 3 minutes longer than this eclipse. It was the 38th eclipse of Lunar Saros 129, with an umbral eclipse magnitude of 1.60868. The total lunar eclipse with the greatest magnitude in the 21st century will occur on June 26, 2029, with an umbral eclipse magnitude of 1.84362.
- July 31
  - Mars makes its closest approach to Earth since 2003, four days after reaching opposition.
  - Aeroméxico Connect Flight 2431 crashed on takeoff from Durango International Airport. Shortly after becoming airborne, the plane encountered sudden wind shear caused by a microburst. The plane rapidly lost speed and altitude and impacted the runway, detaching the engines and skidding to a halt about 1,000 feet (300 m) beyond the runway. The plane caught fire and was destroyed. All 103 people on board survived, but 39 passengers and crew members were injured.

=== August ===
VOA newscast on August 1, 2018
Voice of America newscast on August 1, 2018

- August 1 – The 2018 Kivu Ebola outbreak begins in the Democratic Republic of the Congo. It becomes the second-deadliest outbreak of the Ebola virus on November 29, surpassed only by the 2013 West African Ebola virus epidemic.
- August 2 – Apple Inc. becomes the world's first public company to achieve a market capitalization of $1 trillion.
- August 5 – A magnitude 6.9 earthquake struck the island of Lombok, Indonesia, killing 563 people and injuring more than a thousand people.
- August 7 – The United States reimposes sanctions on Iran.
- August 10 – Protests against the government of Romania, prime-minister Viorica Dăncilă and PSD leader and corrupt businessman Liviu Dragnea take place in Bucharest, Cluj-Napoca and other major Romanian cities. In Bucharest, the protests take a violent shape and, in the course of a few hours, over 400 people are injured, including civilians not taking part in the protests and police units, and more than a thousand people suffer effects from tear gas and hand grenades thrown by the Romanian Jandarmerie units deployed and backed by the PSD-ruled government.
- August 10–20 – Heavy rainfall causes severe floods in the Indian state of Kerala. It is the worst flood to hit the state in a century.
- August 12
  - The five littoral states – Russia, Kazakhstan, Azerbaijan, Iran and Turkmenistan – sign the Convention on the legal status of the Caspian Sea, ending the 20-year long dispute over the Caspian Sea's legal status.
  - NASA launches the uncrewed Parker Solar Probe to study the Sun at close range and the solar wind.
- August 14 – Part of the Morandi Bridge collapses after a violent storm in Genoa, Italy, causing 43 fatalities. Deputy Prime Minister Luigi Di Maio and transport minister Danilo Toninelli blame private company Autostrade per l'Italia.
- August 18–September 2 – The 2018 Asian Games are held in Jakarta and Palembang, Indonesia.
- August 20 – 15 year old Swedish pupil Greta Thunberg starts to stay out of school in an attempt to give attention to the climate change issue.
- August 23 – Ecuador withdraws from ALBA.
- August 24 – Scott Morrison succeeds Malcolm Turnbull as Prime Minister of Australia following a Liberal Party leadership ballot. Morrison is sworn in as Prime Minister later that evening.
- August 25 – The amateur boxing match between KSI and Logan Paul takes place at Manchester Arena, the fight is dubbed as the biggest amateur boxing match in history.

=== September ===
- September 2 – A fire breaks out in the National Museum of Brazil in Rio de Janeiro, destroying more than 90 percent of its archive of 20 million items.
- September 6 – The Supreme Court of India decriminalises homosexuality.; Brazilian congressman Jair Bolsonaro is stabbed in the stomach at Juiz de Fora, Minas Gerais, during a rally while running for the presidency.
- September 9 – The 2018 Swedish general election is held to elect all 349 members of the Riksdag, Sweden's unicameral legislature.
- September 14 – Hurricane Florence makes landfall in North Carolina as a category 1 hurricane, causing record-breaking flooding, which would result in 54 fatalities and $24.2 billion (2018 USD) in damages.
- September 14–16 – Typhoon Mangkhut impacts the Philippines, Taiwan, Hong Kong and China, resulting in more than 60 fatalities.
- September 16 – Hydrail train enters service on the Buxtehude-Bremervörde-Bremerhaven-Cuxhaven line in Lower Saxony, Germany.
- September 17 – Syrian Civil War: While the Israeli Air Force conduct missile strikes that hit targets in western Syria, a Russian Il-20 reconnaissance plane is shot down by a Syrian surface-to-air missile, killing all 15 Russian servicemen on board. Russia blamed Israel's military for the accident because the Israeli jets that conducted the strikes allegedly used the Russian plane as cover to allow them to approach their targets without being hit by Syrian fire.
- September 20 – The MV Nyerere capsizes on Lake Victoria, killing at least 228 passengers.
- September 22 – An attack at a military parade kills 30 people (including 5 attackers) and injures 70 more in Ahvaz, Iran.
- September 28 – A magnitude 7.5 earthquake hits Sulawesi, Indonesia, causing a tsunami that kills at least 4,340 people and injures more than 10,679 others.

=== October ===
- October 1 – The International Court of Justice rules that Chile is not obliged to negotiate access to the Pacific Ocean with Bolivia.
- October 2 – The Washington Post journalist Jamal Khashoggi is murdered inside the Saudi consulate in Istanbul, Turkey, triggering a diplomatic crisis for Saudi Arabia.
- October 6 – The 2018 Latvian parliamentary election is held to elect all 100 members of the Saeima, Latvia's unicameral legislature.
- October 8 – The IPCC releases its Special Report on Global Warming of 1.5 °C, warning that "rapid, far-reaching and unprecedented changes in all aspects of society" are needed to ensure that global warming is kept below 1.5 °C.
- October 10 – Hurricane Michael makes landfall at Mexico Beach, Florida as a Category 5 hurricane with winds of 160 mph (260 km/h) and a minimum pressure of 919 mb (27.1 inHg). It is the most intense hurricane to hit the mainland United States since Camille in 1969.
- October 16 – Canada legalises the sale and use of cannabis, becoming the second country in the world to do so, after Uruguay in 2013.
- October 17 – A school shooting and bomb attack in Kerch, Crimea, kills 20 people and injures 70 others.
- October 19
  - At least 59 people are killed and at least 100 injured when a train runs through a crowd at a Hindu festival in Punjab, India.
  - The uncrewed European-Japanese spacecraft BepiColombo is launched on a seven-year journey to Mercury.
- October 20
  - 700,000 people march through central London demanding a second referendum on the final Brexit deal. The event is the second most attended protest of the 21st century in the United Kingdom after the "Stop the War" anti-Iraq War march in 2003.
  - President Trump announces that the US will "terminate" the Intermediate-Range Nuclear Forces Treaty over alleged Russian violations.
- October 23 – The Hong Kong–Zhuhai–Macau Bridge, the world's longest sea crossing bridge, is opened by Chinese Paramount leader Xi Jinping.
- October 26 – Red Dead Redemption II is released on PS4 and Xbox One. It would become the 8th best selling video game of all-time with 50,000,000+ copies sold.
- October 27
  - Michael D. Higgins is re-elected President of Ireland after receiving 822,566 first preference votes in the 2018 Irish presidential election.
  - Eleven people are killed during the Pittsburgh synagogue shooting.
- October 28 – The right-wing Jair Bolsonaro is elected as the next President of Brazil, with 55% of the vote.
- October 29 – Lion Air Flight 610 crashes off the coast of Java, killing all 189 people on board.
- October 30 – NASA's Kepler space telescope mission ends after the spacecraft runs out of fuel.

=== November ===
- November 1 – NASA's Dawn mission concludes after it runs out of hydrazine fuel.
- November 4 – Amazonas ambush, three Venezuelan border guards were killed and ten were wounded in a suspected Colombian ELN guerrilla attack in the Venezuelan Amazonas state.
- November 5 – Two U.S. space probes simultaneously (and coincidentally) reach "opposite" milestones in relation to the solar heliosphere: Voyager 2 passed through the heliopause, the outer limit of the Sun's magnetic field, into interstellar space within hours of the Parker Solar Probe reaching its first perihelion, the closest point to the Sun on its initial orbit.
- November 6 – the 2018 United States midterm elections take place.
- November 8 – The Camp Fire ignites in Butte County, California. It becomes California's deadliest and most destructive wildfire, with 88 deaths and 18,804 buildings destroyed.
- November 8 – The Royal Norwegian Navy Frigate Helge Ingstad, part of Standing NATO Maritime Group 1, collides with an oil tanker, and sinks in shallow waters off the coast of Norway. The frigate is later scrapped due to the damages.
- November 11 – Many nations around the world, particularly ones in Europe and the Commonwealth, along with the United States, commemorate the centenary of the end of World War I with Armistice Day, Veterans Day, and Remembrance Day ceremonies, speeches, parades, and memorials.
- November 26 – NASA's InSight probe successfully lands on the surface of Mars.
- November 27 – Kerch Strait incident: Ukraine declares martial law after an armed incident in which the Russian Federal Security Service (FSB) coast guard fired upon and captured three Ukrainian Navy vessels attempting to pass from the Black Sea into the Sea of Azov through the Kerch Strait.
- November 28 – Chinese scientist He Jiankui, at a public conference in Hong Kong, announces that he has altered the DNA of twin human girls born earlier in the month to try to make them resistant to infection with the HIV virus; he also reveals the possible second pregnancy of another gene-modified baby.
- November 30 – The Kanden Tunnel Trolleybus, one of the last remaining Japanese trolleybus systems, closes.

=== December ===
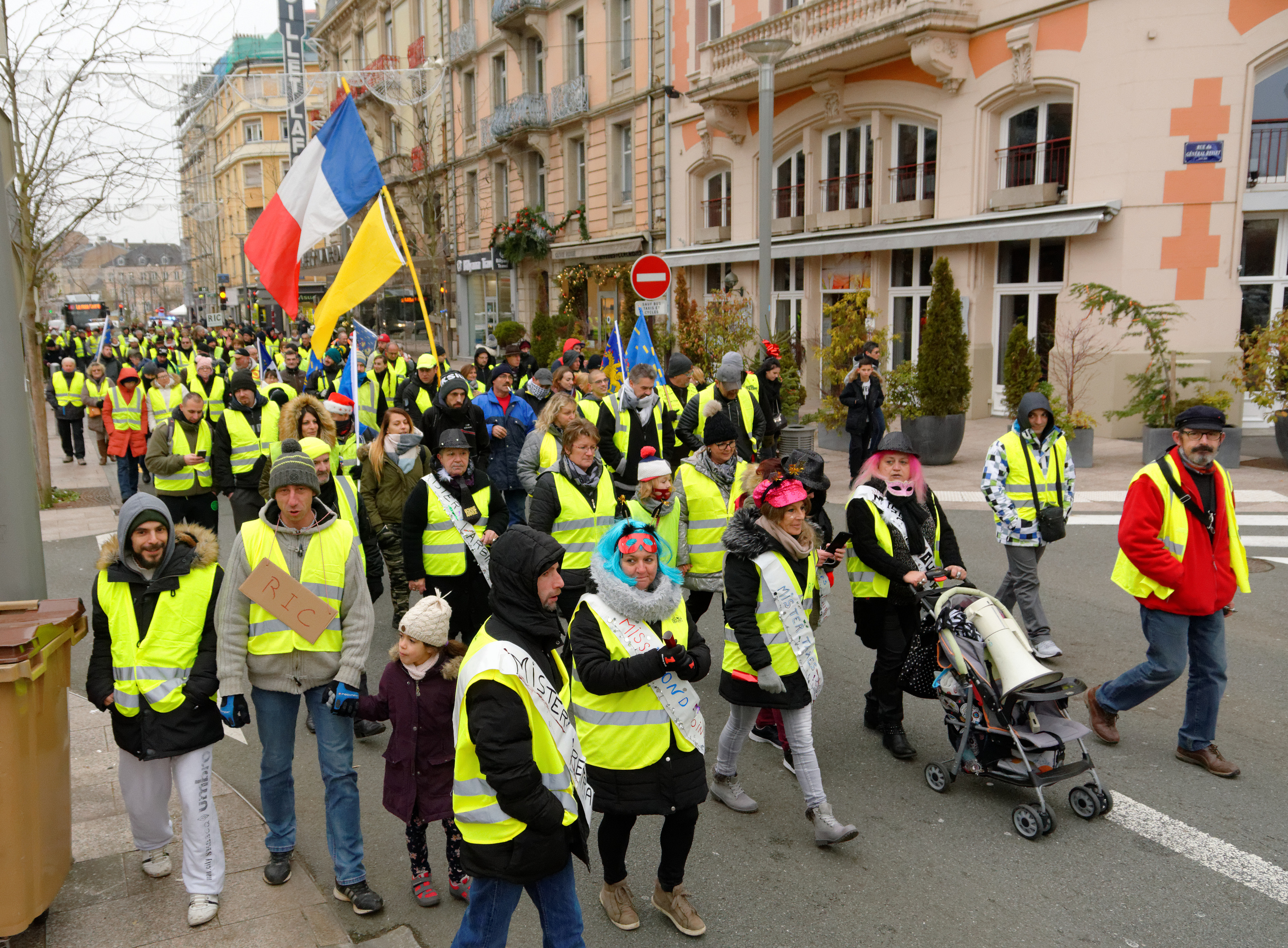
Protest of the gilet jaunes

- December 1–8 – France experiences its worst civil unrest since the protests of 1968 due to the yellow vests movement. Protests in Paris morph into riots, with hundreds of people injured and thousands arrested; over 100 cars are burned, the Arc de Triomphe is vandalized and numerous other tourist sites are closed, both in the capital and elsewhere in the country.
- December 1 – The Oulu Police informed the public about the first offence of the much larger child sexual exploitation in Oulu, Finland.
- December 3 – NASA reports the arrival of the OSIRIS-REx probe at Bennu, the agency's first sample-return mission to an asteroid.
- December 4 – A Spanish institutional crisis surrounding the General Council of the Judiciary (CGPJ) begins.
- December 7 – The U.N.'s International Telecommunication Union reports that, by the end of 2018, more than half – a full 51.2 percent – of the world's population are now using the Internet.
- December 9 – Parliamentary elections were held in Armenia on 9 December 2018.
- December 15 – At the Katowice Climate Change Conference, nearly 200 nations agree rules on implementing the 2015 Paris agreement.
- December 17 – Scandinavian tourists Louisa Vesterager Jespersen and Maren Ueland are murdered by Islamic terrorists in the foothills of Mount Toubkal near to the village of Imlil in Morocco. At least one victim is beheaded with the murders recorded on video and posted on social media. In a previous video the perpetrators pledge allegiance to ISIS.
- December 19–21 – Gatwick Airport drone incident: Reports of drone sightings close to the runway at Gatwick Airport in England causes major disruption, affecting approximately 140,000 passengers and 1,000 flights, making it the largest disruption since ash from an Icelandic volcano shut the airport in 2010.
- December 20 – In the Sea of Japan, the South Korean warship ROKS Gwanggaeto the Great targets a Japanese P-1 maritime patrol airplane with its fire control radar while it was responding to a North Korean fishing boat in distress, creating a cause célèbre between the two countries.
- December 21 – The Dow Jones Industrial Average closes at 22,445 after its worst week since 2008.
- December 22
  - An eruption from Krakatoa causes a tsunami that hits the Sunda Strait, Indonesia, killing at least 430 people and injuring nearly 1,500.
  - The United States government enters a second government shutdown, arising over a dispute over funding for the U.S.–Mexico border wall. The shutdown, which lasted until January 25, 2019, is the longest government shutdown in U.S. history.
- December 24 – Burundi moves its capital from Bujumbura to Gitega.
- December 26 – After weeks of losses the Dow Jones Industrial Average posts its largest ever one-day point gain: 1,086 points.
- December 31 – 2018 Magnitogorsk building collapse: An apartment block in Magnitogorsk, Chelyabinsk Oblast, Russia, partially collapses, killing 39 people and injuring 17 more. According to the official investigation the collapse was caused by a gas explosion.

== Nobel Prizes ==
Nobel medal

- Chemistry – Frances Arnold, George Smith and Greg Winter
- Economics – William Nordhaus and Paul Romer
- Literature – Olga Tokarczuk (awarded in 2019)
- Peace – Denis Mukwege and Nadia Murad
- Physics – Arthur Ashkin, Gérard Mourou, and Donna Strickland
- Physiology or Medicine – James P. Allison and Tasuku Honjo

== See also ==
- 2010s in political history
- List of International observances § Years
