= Diplomacy of the Caspian littoral states =

Agreements regarding international status of the Caspian Sea

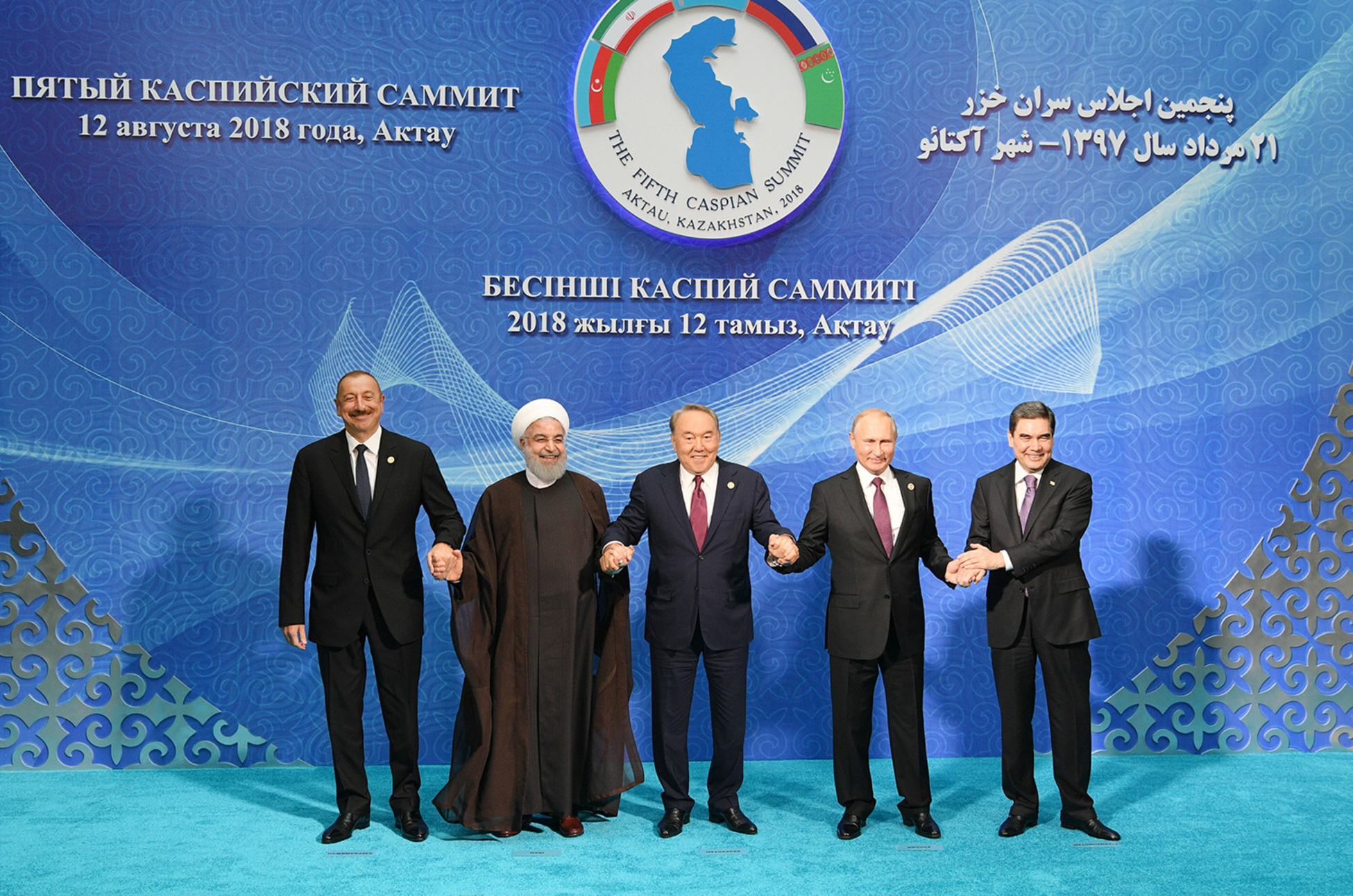
The fifth summit of the Caspian littoral states in Aktau 2018

Several states in the Caspian region, including the five littoral states of the Caspian Sea, namely the Islamic Republic of Iran, Turkmenistan, Kazakhstan, the Russian Federation, and the Republic of Azerbaijan use ad hoc diplomatic relations to build trust and goodwill as well as to boost the bargaining power of their governments.

Generally, the focus is to establish, design, and amend regional and international rules about the world system and the littoral states.

Mechanisms include hard power, soft power, and smart power to achieve hard security, soft security, and smart security.

== Summits ==
Diplomatic processes include repeated summits over the centuries:

- Treaty of Turkmenchay, 1828 - The first diplomatic effort, the treaty barred Iran from deploying military ships in the Caspian Sea.
- Ashgabat, 2002 - The first Caspian Sea Summit was held in Ashgabat, Turkmenistan, in April 2003. Items included combating pollution and the protecting the water in the Caspian Sea.
- Tehran, 2007 - The next summit was held in Tehran and ended with the signing of the Caspian Environment Convention. This was the first international law document related to the Caspian Sea, approved and implemented by the legislatures of the five littoral states. The meeting agreed on general principles of fisheries, protection of the Caspian Sea, and shipping from littoral countries. A memorandum of understanding on security and military cooperation aimed at fighting terrorism and extremism was also negotiated.
- Baku, 2010 - On November 18, 2010, the group met in Baku. It achieved the signing of the Security and Military Cooperation Agreement.
- Astrakhan, 2014 - The fourth summit was held in 2014 in Astrakhan, in the Russian Federation. It resulted in three agreements:
  - Protection and optimal use of water resources
  - Weather
  - Prevention and response to emergencies.
- Nur-Sultan, 2017 - The Astana Summit was held at the foreign minister level in 2017. Although the foreign ministers had sufficient authority to coordinate some parts of the Caspian Sea Convention, disagreement on some key issues led to adjournment to the following year. Issues included the division of the Caspian Sea into national sections, construction of pipelines across the seabed, and the navigational situation.
- Aktau, 2018 - The meeting in 2018 in Aktau, Kazakhstan reached an agreement on the forms of exploitation of the Caspian Sea, and the water and coastal boundaries between the five states. The agreement had 24 articles. Among the more important were:
  - Article 1: A warship belonging to peacekeeping forces must have the insignia of one of the five states and be under the command of an officer formally appointed by that government.
  - Article 2: Sovereignty, sovereign rights, monopoly and jurisdiction will be exercised in the Caspian Sea. The Convention set out the rights and obligations of the parties, including the waters, water bed, subsoil, natural resources, and airspace above the sea.
  - Article 5: The Caspian Sea water area is divided into inland waters, territorial waters, fishing areas, and common sea areas.

== Political cooperation ==
=== Energy ===
The Caspian Sea's oil resources are second only to those of the Persian Gulf. Security concerns in the Middle East and the consequent reluctance to invest there have increased the focus on the Caspian region and its energy resources.

The Caspian Sea basin reserves include 48 billion barrels of oil and gas reserves of 292 trillion cubic meters, the world's fourth largest gas reserve.

==== Pipelines ====
1. Baku–Tbilisi–Ceyhan pipeline
2. South Caucasus Pipeline
3. Turkmenistan–Afghanistan–Pakistan–India Pipeline

The five states have not yet set resource exploitation rules. The main reason for these disputes and crises is how to transfer and export these resources.
