= Alov field =

Offshore oil and gas structure in the Caspian Sea

- Region: Disputed maritime zone (between Azerbaijan and Iran)
- Location: Caspian Sea
- Operator: Exploration suspended (Force majeure)

The Alov field (also referred to as the Araz-Alov-Sharg hydrocarbon block) is a major prospective offshore oil and gas structure in the southern Caspian Sea. It lies within a disputed maritime boundary zone between Azerbaijan and Iran, where it is known as the Alborz field. Due to overlapping territorial claims and a military standoff in 2001, active exploration and development operations at the block remain suspended.

== Reserves ==
Geological evaluations indicate that the Alov block possesses significant hydrocarbon potential, primarily dominated by natural gas. According to regional energy resource reports compiled by the United Nations Economic Commission for Europe (UNECE), the site is estimated to contain up to 700 billion cubic metres of natural gas, alongside unappraised oil deposits.

== 2001 Caspian Sea incident ==
The field became the center of a geopolitical and military crisis in the summer of 2001. In 1998, the State Oil Company of Azerbaijan Republic (SOCAR) had signed a Production Sharing Agreement (PSA) with a consortium led by British Petroleum (BP-Amoco) and Statoil (now Equinor) to survey the area for hydrocarbon deposits.

On July 23, 2001, two Azerbaijani research vessels, the Geofizik-III and the Alif Hajiyev, were conducting seismic exploration works on behalf of BP. They were intercepted by an Iranian warship supported by two fighter jets. The Iranian military demanded that the survey ships leave immediately, claiming the vessels were violating Iran's 20-percent territorial sector of the Caspian Sea.

Following the military threat, BP suspended its operations in the disputed block, citing safety concerns and a strict corporate policy against operating in militarized border disputes. The incident prompted sharp diplomatic protests from Baku and international condemnation, culminating in a demonstration of military support for Azerbaijan by Turkey, whose aerobatic team conducted a flyby over Baku the following month to deter further airspace violations.

== Current status ==
Following the first Caspian Summit in April 2002, Baku and Tehran officially agreed that all exploration and drilling activities in disputed offshore hydrocarbon fields, including Alov/Alborz, would remain frozen until a definitive maritime border delimitation agreement was reached.

Although the littoral states signed the Convention on the legal status of the Caspian Sea in August 2018, the treaty primarily addressed surface rights and left the exact delimitation of the seabed to bilateral agreements. Because Azerbaijan and Iran have yet to finalize their bilateral seabed boundaries, and despite periodic diplomatic discussions aimed at joint exploration, the Alov block largely remains in a state of force majeure.

== See also ==
- Azerbaijan–Iran relations
- Convention on the legal status of the Caspian Sea
