= Helge Ingstad collision =

2018 ship collision in Hjeltefjorden, Norway

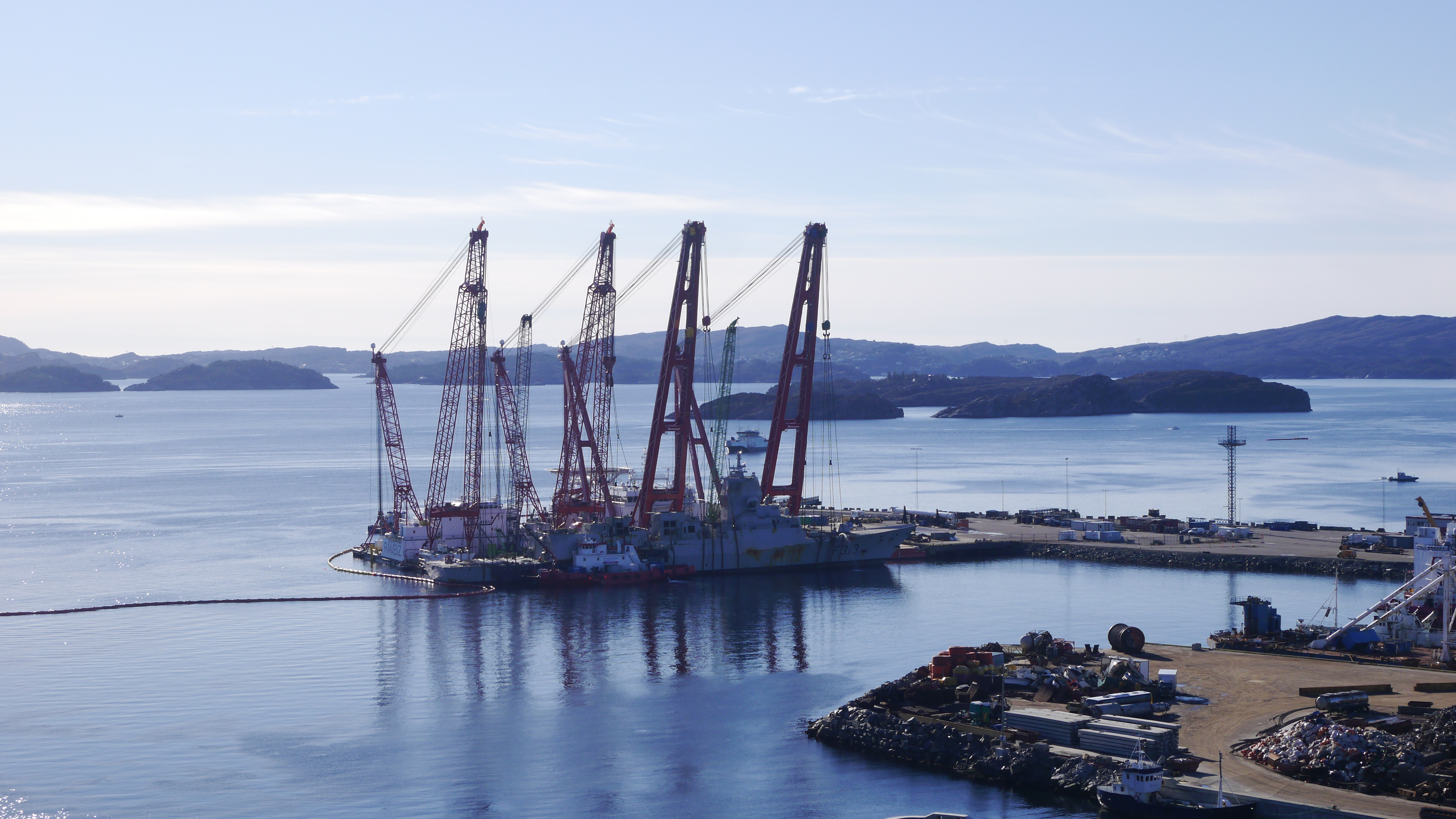
- Norwegian navy ship HNoMS Helge Ingstad being salvaged by floating cranes at Hanøytangen, Askøy Municipality
- Date: 8 November 2018
- Location: Hjeltefjorden, Norway; 60°37′51″N 4°50′49″E
- Cause: a range of operational, technical, organisational and systemic factors
- Injuries: 8

The Helge Ingstad collision was a ship collision between the Norwegian frigate Helge Ingstad and the Maltese tanker Sola TS. The accident happened on the night of 8 November 2018 in the Hjeltefjorden north of the Sture Terminal in Øygarden Municipality.

The frigate was assigned to Standing NATO Maritime Group 1 and was with the group on its way to Dundee in Scotland after the Exercise Trident Juncture 2018. The frigate broke out of formation on the evening of 7 November to sail along the coast. The plan was to head west towards Scotland north of Haugesund. In Hjeltefjorden, the frigate collided with Sola TS, which was on its way to the United Kingdom with crude oil.

An attempt was made to ground the frigate, but it sank and lay in shallow water until it was raised on 27 February 2019. The tanker suffered no major damage. Eight people on board the frigate were injured in the accident, none of them seriously.

After thorough investigations, it was decided that it was unprofitable to repair the ship; and in February 2021, Helge Ingstad was towed to Hanøytangen for recycling.

== Ships ==
=== Helge Ingstad ===
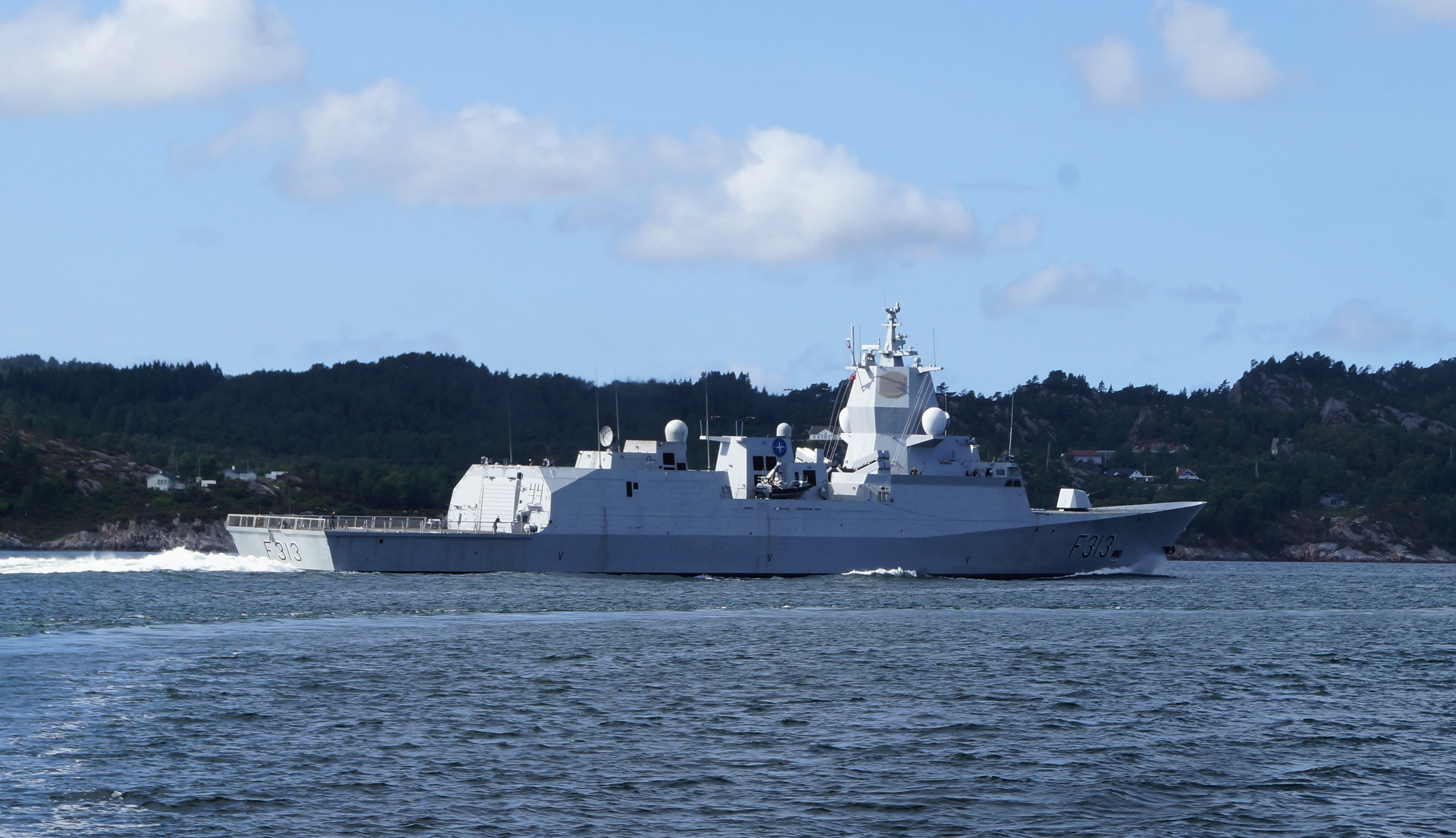
Helge Ingstad in Lerøyosen in 2018

HNoMS Helge Ingstad was a Fridtjof Nansen-class frigate, delivered to the Norwegian Navy in 2009. The vessel was 134 metres (439 ft 8 in) long and had a top speed of over 26 knots (48 km/h; 30 mph). It had 137 people on board, eight of whom were slightly injured. The ship had taken part in the NATO exercise Trident Juncture, and the Norwegian Armed Forces initially stated that it was on its way back to its home port at the Haakonsvern Naval Base. Later this was corrected to mean that it was on its way to Dundee in Scotland. According to NATO, the ship was conducting navigation training when it collided. The frigate had no pilot on board. It sailed without sending its position via automatic identification system (AIS), thus the ship was visible on radar, but not identifiable to other traffic and the Fedje Vessel Traffic Service Centre. AIS was activated only after the collision. Other vessels' names, position, speed and course would be visible on the frigate's chart plotter even if they themselves did not transmit AIS. The frigate notified the traffic center in the usual way when it approached the waters, and this cleared Helge Ingstad into the area. Both on radar and chart plotter, other vessels in the waters would have been visible with their speed vectors. The vectors would show the calculated collision point.

The frigate cost around NOK 3.5 billion when new. In 2018, it was accounted for at NOK 1.8 billion. Helge Ingstad was, at the time of the collision, part of Standing NATO Maritime Group 1 (SNMG1).

=== Sola TS ===
MT Sola TS is a tanker built in 2017 and registered in Valletta, Malta. It is 250 metres (820 ft 3 in) long, and had 24 people on board during the accident. No one on board was injured. The ship was heading north, and had set out from Stureterminalen 20 minutes before it collided with the frigate. It was loaded with 625,000 barrels of crude oil.

The tugboat Tenax escorted the tanker at the stern. The tanker had a pilot on board.

In contrast to Helge Ingstad, Sola TS only suffered minor damage to the bow after the collision and was never in danger of sinking. The ship had to sail to a shipyard in Gdańsk for repairs after the accident, and at the end of December 2018 was back in normal sailing again.

== Collision ==
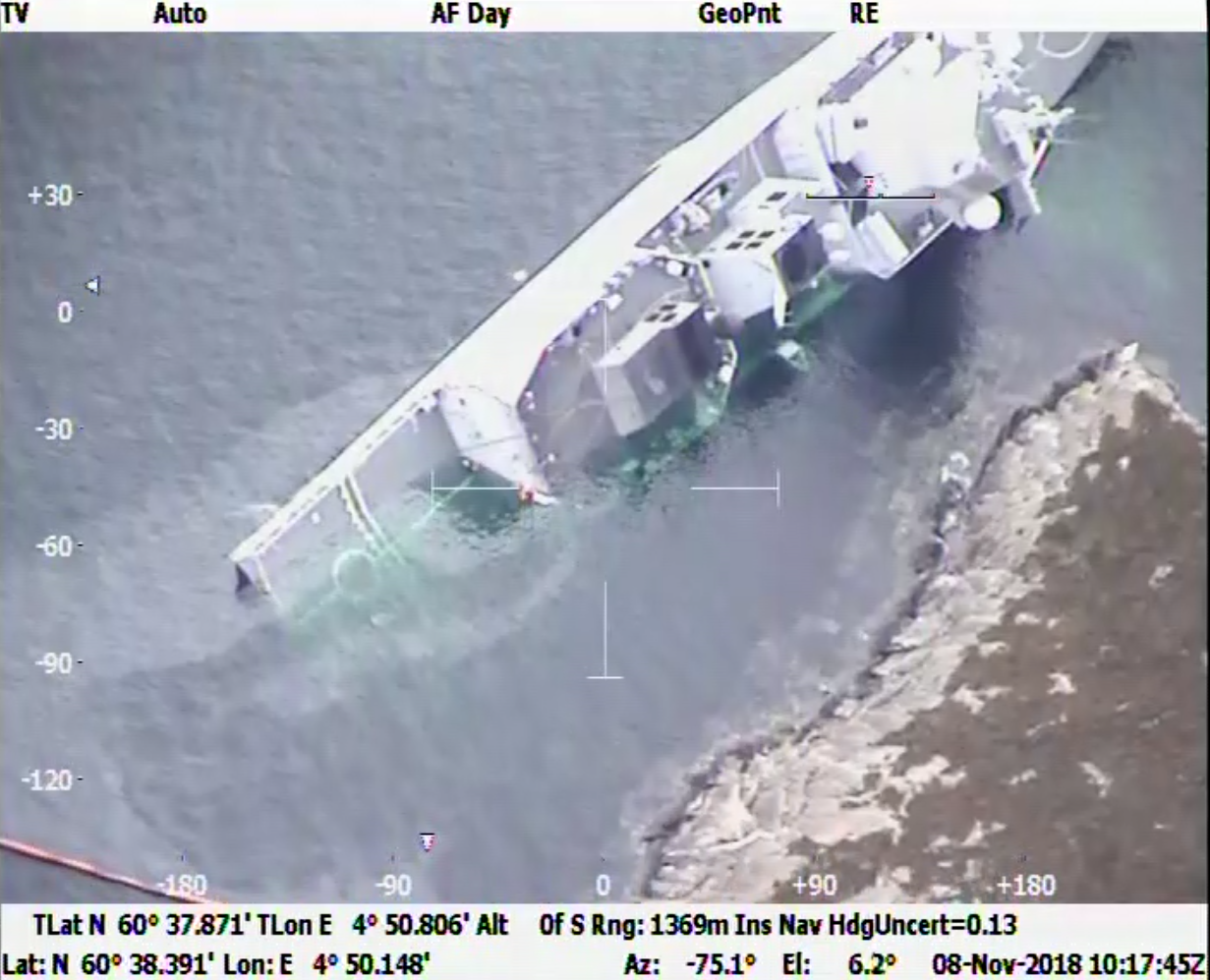
Helge Ingstad sinking after the collision

According to the Attorney General, the overall behavior of Helge Ingstad's bridge crew was negligent. Prior to the accident, the frigate was navigating without the AIS activated, which is not unusual for naval vessels. Broadcasting of own AIS identity was activated only after the collision. According to recordings from marine VHF radio that Verdens Gang published on 10 November 2018, there was radio communication between Sola TS, Helge Ingstad and Fedje Vessel Traffic Service Centre prior to the accident. Three minutes before the collision, Sola TS asked the Fedje Vessel Traffic Service Centre which ship was approaching. Fedje Vessel Traffic Service Centre center replied that it did not know, while Helge Ingstad remained silent. On Sola TS an attempt was made to establish contact using an Aldis lamp (Morse lamp). Nor did Helge Ingstad react to this. The maritime traffic center came back and said it could be Helge Ingstad. Radio contact was then established between Sola TS and Helge Ingstad, and Helge Ingstad was asked to turn to starboard. They did not comply, and the collision occurred. The freighter MS Vestbris passed the frigate immediately after the collision. The mate of Vestbris saw no light on the frigate. It is not unusual for the navy's vessels to only display regulated navigation lights and otherwise night lights on the bridge; with a closed vessel, only the bridge and lanterns emit light.

The tanker suffered damage in the bow. It was given a hole of 90 by 60 centimeters (35 by 24 in) in the plates on the impacted side, at the level of the anchor block. The bulkhead lining on the starboard side of the bow was bent in several places, the anchor cleat was pushed in and had a hole in the upper part. The windlass went out of service and the hydraulic motor was most likely damaged. The chain lock was partially bent, the anchor ripped out and pulled out ≈20 metres (66 ft) of chain.

The anchor cleats on Sola TS are designed as large "horns" that extend well beyond the ship's side, so that the anchor will not come into conflict with the underwater bulb in the bow. The frigate was hit well above the waterline, but the anchor cleat tore up an ≈45-meter (148 ft) long gash in the hull. The damage opened several watertight sections to the sea. First, 127 of the 137 on board were evacuated. Later, the captain decided that the last ten should also evacuate the ship. At 06:40 (Central European Time) everyone on board was brought ashore. Six of the injured were sent to the local emergency room, while two were sent to Haukeland University Hospital.

According to the audio log that was later published by Verdens Gang, Helge Ingstad reported a loss of momentum and somewhat later that the ship had run against the ground. When Ajax and other auxiliary vessels dispatched from Stureterminalen found Helge Ingstad, the vessel had already grounded. Frigates of the Fridtjof Nansen class are equipped with a one megawatt (1,300 hp) steerable electric azimuth thruster from Brunvoll AS. This is mounted directly under the bridge and can be pulled into the hull. In an emergency, the thruster can be used as a propulsion machine. Approximately 10,000 liters (2,200 imp gal; 2,600 U.S. gal) of helicopter fuel leaked into the sea from the frigate. The Navy held a press conference on 8 November and said, among other things, that the frigate had run against the ground. Furthermore, it was said that the frigate was held against the shore to prevent it from sinking.

=== Hollow propeller shaft ===
In the collision, the anchor cleat on Sola TS tore a long gash in 1/3 of the hull on the starboard side of the frigate. The gash started above the main deck. The frigate capsized due to the impact and the gash reaches the waterline approximately at the bulkhead of the ship. The frigate was divided into 13 watertight sections. The split tore open two, a bath area and a generator room. The propeller shafts pass through the punctured generator compartment and the shafts were hollow throughout. Water was therefore led into the gear room between the forward turbine room and the aft engine room. The gear compartment was flooded. Here, the drive shafts to the turbine and engine were also not sealed and both engine rooms were flooded. Thus, five to six of the watertight sections were lost and the vessel was evacuated. Later Helge Ingstad sank. The remaining sections may not have been completely sealed either. Later investigations have shown that when the ship was abandoned, the vast majority of watertight bulkheads and hatches were left in an open position. Over time, water penetrated into ever new sections as the vessel slowly sank.

== Consequences ==
After the collision, Equinor chose to close production at Stureterminalen. This resulted in a shutdown of the Oseberg oil field, the Grane field, the Svalin field, the Edvard Grieg field and the Troll gas field. Production at Kollsnes was also halted. Gassco feared an explosion with consequences for a gas pipeline 200 meters (660 ft) away from the accident site. Production resumed in the evening of the same day.

== Lifting and transport ==
The ship was grounded approximately 20 nautical miles (37 km; 23 mi) northwest of Bergen

The lifting operation was led by the Royal Norwegian Navy with the support of Defense Material in collaboration with the external contractors BOA Management and DNV. The Norwegian Coastal Administration was responsible for environmental measures. The police were responsible for enforcing the exclusion zone around the vessel, which was 500 metres (1,600 ft) on land and 1,000 metres (3,300 ft) at sea.

The side of the frigate was impacted and partially underwater. To prevent it from sinking or becoming more unstable, it was secured with cables to land in the days after the accident. The day after the accident, personnel from the Royal Norwegian Navy were on board to further secure the cables on board and extract data information from logs.

The navy took responsibility for raising the frigate, for which they were criticized. The Green Warriors of Norway claimed that the Royal Norwegian Navy did not have the necessary expertise, and wanted the Coastal Administration to take over. It was also claimed that the cables securing the frigate to shore were incorrectly fitted and undersized. In the early morning of 13 November, several of the cables snapped, causing the frigate to sink further. In a press conference later the same day, the navy rejected criticism of the salvage operation and claimed that the cables had been installed correctly. BOA Management AS was engaged to raise and transport the vessel.

The two crane ships Gulliver and Rambiz from the Belgian company Scaldis were hired to lift the frigate onto the semi-submersible barge BOAbarge 33. The diving vessel MS Risøy from SubseaPartners prepared to empty the frigate's fuel tanks. They contained 460,000 L (100,000 imp gal; 120,000 US gal) of marine diesel oil. The lifting depended on the weather conditions and was postponed several times. The lifting itself started on 26 February 2019. The weather forecast was worrying and a decision was made to move further elevation to Hanøytangen. In the evening of 27 February, Helge Ingstad started to be lifted from the two cranes. The frigate was transported 15 nautical miles (28 km; 17 mi) to Hanøytangen. On 2 March the vessel was raised and transferred to the barge. On 3 March, the tow started to Haakonsvern Naval Base where it was moored at the main quay approximately at 11 p.m. Here the ship was to be disarmed, inspected and repaired. The hull was afloat again five to six weeks after.

== Aftermath ==
The Norwegian Safety Investigation Authority and the Norwegian National Accident Commission for the Norwegian Armed Forces decided to investigate the accident together, in collaboration with the Maltese Marine Safety Investigation Unit. Spain's accident commission CIAIM is also participating in the investigation, as the frigate was built at a Spanish shipyard. The Norwegian Safety Investigation Authority led the investigation. The Accident Investigation Board for Transport questioned everyone who was present on the bridge of both ships, as well as on the tugboat Tenax which escorted the tanker. The Accident Investigation Board's investigations do not take a position on civil or criminal guilt and/or responsibility. The Royal Norwegian Navy established an internal investigation, the results of which will be shared with the Accident Investigation Board.

In retrospect, it has been speculated whether Sola TS was too far to the west. The maritime pilot, Erik Blom, refuted this and referred to the location as within the norm. The Ministry of Defense confirmed that American defense personnel were on board Helge Ingstad when the collision occurred.

The Norwegian Safety Investigation Authority presented a preliminary report on 29 November 2018. The personnel on the bridge of Helge Ingstad both before and after the change of watch 20 minutes before the accident were of the opinion that the lights they saw from Sola TS were from a stationary object in connection with the Sture Terminal, and not from an oncoming ship. Contrary to the International Regulations for Preventing Collisions at Sea, "Sola TS" had the same deck lights on after the ship left as when they were still at the terminal. The personnel on the bridge of Helge Ingstad were of the opinion that the radio call just before the accident was from one of the three other oncoming ships. The Norwegian Safety Investigation Authority had also discovered that the watertight bulkheads on Helge Ingstad were nevertheless not watertight and issued two safety-critical alerts regarding this. Prime Minister Erna Solberg stated that a compensation claim against the Spanish shipyard may become relevant. Defense material notified Navantia in a letter that there could be legal action against the shipyard. Navantia wrote in a reply letter on 11 January 2019 that the shipyard believes there is no basis for that.

=== Decision ===
In May 2019, the Minister of Defense was presented with a report from Defense Material which concluded that a possible repair would cost 12–14 billion and take more than five years. The cost of purchasing a new corresponding vessel was estimated at NOK 11–13 billion, with a completion time of just over five years.

On 24 June 2019, the Ministry of Defense ordered Defense Material to dispose of Helge Ingstad, as it would be unprofitable to repair the ship.

In July 2020, an order was put out for the demilitarisation, destruction and recovery of the frigate. Due to circumstances worthy of screening, it was decided that only Norwegian providers could participate in the competition. In January 2021, it became known that Norscrap West AS won the tender, and in February the ship was towed to Hanøytangen on Askøy for recycling. The destruction was finished in February 2022.

Defense material expects to receive sales revenue from the metal in the frigate worth between NOK 15 and 18 million. It is also estimated that there will still be spare parts and components worth between NOK 100–400 million.

== Investigation ==
=== First interim report ===
The Norwegian Safety Investigation Authority published an interim report on 8 November 2019, on the day one year after the accident. The conclusion was that a number of systemic, organizational, operational and technical factors contributed to the accident.

The Norwegian Safety Investigation Authority also pointed out that the forward-facing deck lighting on Sola TS made it difficult for the frigate's bridge crew to see the navigation lanterns and the signaling from the Aldis lamp on the tanker. The communication between the pilot and the bridge crew on the tanker could also have been better, the Accident Investigation Board pointed out.

The traffic controller at Fedje VTS did not have a good enough understanding of the situation and an overview and thus did not provide relevant and timely information to the vessels involved, and did not carry out traffic regulation when the tanker left the Sture terminal.

The fact that Helge Ingstad went with AIS in passive mode meant that neither Fedje sjøtrafikksentral nor Sola TS had Helge Ingstad identified on their screens.

The Norwegian Safety Investigation Authority made 15 safety recommendations to the parties involved, nine of which were aimed at the Royal Norwegian Navy. One recommendation is addressed to the Ministry of Defence, two to the shipping company Tsakos Columbia Shipmanagement S.A., which owns Sola TS, two to the Coastal Administration and one to the Norwegian Maritime Directorate.

=== Second interim report ===
The Norwegian Safety Investigation Authority published interim report two on 21 April 2021. This report deals with everything that happened from the collision until the rescue work was finished and made 28 safety recommendations. The report concluded that:

transl. "accident control with prioritization of the right measures could contribute to gaining control of the situation on board. In order for the crew to have been able to assess actions other than those taken, a better understanding of the vessel's stability characteristics would have been required. Furthermore, further expertise, training and practice, as well as better decision support tools than what they had available, would have been necessary. Based on the knowledge the crew had in the current situation and under the given conditions, it is nevertheless understandable that it was decided to evacuate the vessel and not risk life and health."

It was also concluded that the ship could have been kept afloat and thus saved if the crew had closed the watertight bulkheads in the frigate.

== The Norwegian Armed Forces' internal investigation ==
The Norwegian Armed Forces concluded after its internal investigation that it was not one single error that caused the collision, but a long series of events. Among other things, it was pointed out that too little experience and competence among the crew, in addition to failing interaction between the crew on the bridge, "transl. substantially contributed to the collision". The Norwegian Armed Forces examined a total of 88 safety barriers that were supposed to prevent this type of accident. In total, the Norwegian Armed Forces found that 53 of these were violated.

== External review of the salvage operation ==
In September 2019, the Ministry of Defence entered into a contract with PriceWaterHouseCoopers to carry out an external and independent review of the salvage operation, in the period from when the crew was evacuated until the vessel was brought to Haakonsvern Naval Base. The investigation was concluded in a publicly available report that was delivered at the end of 2019.

In the report from the investigation on 16 December 2019, PriceWaterHouseCoopers concluded, among other things, that there was technical room for maneuver to save the frigate, that the actors overestimated how secure the frigate was and underestimated the load the anchors on land were exposed to, and that the Royal Norwegian Navy and FMA underestimated the complexity of the salvage operation.

== Civil litigation between the state and the tanker company ==
The State at the Ministry of Defence sued the owner of the tanker TS "Sola", Twitt Navigation Limited, who counter-sued. The subject of the trial is the question of guilt and how the blame should be distributed. The case was to start in Bergen District Court on 21 September 2020 and 16 days had been set aside. The trial was rescheduled to 1 March 2021, then to 3 May 2021, and then to 28 February 2022.

== Civil court case between the state and DNV GL ==
The Ministry of Defense sued the class company DNV GL, which in 2017 gave Helge Ingstad a new class certificate until 2021. The Ministry of Defense states that DNV GL should have discovered that the hollow propeller shafts could cause water to spread quickly. The main hearing is scheduled from 21 September to 29 October 2021 in the Oslo District Court.

However, when the final accident report came in, it became clear that DNV GL was not to blame for the catastrophic consequence of the frigate's collision with the tanker. The State therefore waived its claim against DNV GL, but after a judgment in the Oslo District Court on 1 November 2021 was ordered to pay DNV's legal costs of NOK 4.3 million.

== Civil court case between the state and Navantia ==
In 2019, the Norwegian Armed Forces announced legal action against the Spanish shipbuilder Navantia, which built Helge Ingstad. In August 2024, the Government Attorney confirmed to the Norwegian newspaper Verdens Gang that there was a legal process between the Ministry of Defense and Navantia. Navantia confirmed the legal process, but neither parties were willing to give details.

Teknisk Ukeblad reported in April 2025 that the Norwegian state has sued Navantia for 13.3 billion NOK due to an alleged design flaw in Helge Ingstad, which they claim contributed to the accident in Hjeltefjorden in 2018. The lawsuit asserts that hollow propeller shafts allowed water to flow between watertight sections, a flaw not present in similar Spanish frigates. Navantia, on the other hand, argues that the Norwegian Armed Forces bear responsibility, as the flaw was known before the accident and the frigate was operated with several unaddressed deviations. The state wishes to resolve the matter through mediation, but if that fails, the trial will begin on September 23, 2025. The amount includes the cost of a new frigate, the salvage operation, and various deductions.

== Criminal case ==
=== Investigation ===
West Police District investigated the accident.

During the police investigation, the prosecution gave suspect status to the watch commander on Helge Ingstad, the captain and the pilot on the tanker and the person who was on duty at the traffic center on Fedje.

As part of the investigation, the police obtained professional assessments from the Norwegian Maritime Directorate, the Accident Investigation Board and the Attorney General. The police then sent a proposal for recommendation to the state attorney, who in April 2021 forwarded the case to the Attorney General.

=== Prosecution ===
In May 2022, the prosecuting authority brought charges against the officer who was the responsible duty manager on Helge Ingstad when the accident occurred. He was prosecuted for negligently causing damage at sea under Section 356 of the Penal Code, cf. Section 355 and for neglect of duty under Section 78 of the Military Criminal Code, first paragraph and third paragraph. The prosecuting authority also notified the Ministry of Defense that there was considered to be reason to impose corporate punishment on the Armed Forces, with a deadline of 20 May 2022 to comment on the notification. For the other suspects, the case was dropped.

=== Corporate penalties against the state ===
In June 2022, the state adopted the submission from Hordaland, Sogn og Fjordane state attorney's offices. The Ministry of Defence was thus fined NOK 10 million for breaching Section 356 of the Criminal Code, cf. Section 355, cf. Section 27 for "transl. negligently having caused marine damage or a similar accident, which could easily have resulted in the loss of human life".

In his prosecution decision, the Attorney General concluded that the entire bridge crew on Helge Ingstad acted negligently.

=== Criminal proceedings against the officer of the watch ===
The criminal proceedings against the officer of the watch aboard KNM Helge Ingstad started in Hordaland District Court on 16 January 2023. Eight weeks were set aside for the main hearing. The district court's verdict was published on 15 May 2023. The district court sentenced the officer of the watch to 60 days of suspended imprisonment. The District Court found that the duty officer's actions prior to the collision with the oil tanker were "clearly unjustifiable". The officer of the watch appealed the verdict. The appeal proceedings began in the Gulating Court of Appeal on 23 October 2023. In December 2023, the officer of the watch was again sentenced to 60 days of suspended imprisonment.

In its judgment, the Court of Appeal found that the officer should have intervened much earlier to prevent the collision:

“In this case, Sola TS’s conduct was not unexpected, but stable and visible to the defendant over a prolonged period. The defendant received several signals that something was wrong, including through his own realization. He had immediate access to several alternative and effective navigational aids which, through basic use, would have clarified the misunderstanding. The defendant can clearly be blamed to such a degree that there are grounds for criminal liability for negligent navigation.”

The case was not appealed to the Supreme Court.
