= Soft security =

Soft security usually refers to security that protects something from harm in quiet and unobtrusive ways, often invisibly and after the fact, rather than with visible barriers before the fact. Soft security can refer to immediate security measures, such as silent burglar alarms or motion detectors, but often refers to more elaborate social security systems such as the "moral network" in a tightly knit community — for example, a cluster of friends on a busy city street.

The term has gained widespread use in wiki communities, notably MeatballWiki.

The differentiation between "soft security" and "hard security" was first made by Rasmusson and Jansson who used the term hard security for traditional mechanisms like authentication and access control, and soft security for social control mechanisms.

There is a difference between the related concepts of quality control and soft security. Soft security attempts to discourage harm and mitigate any damage, while quality control attempts to improve a product and weed out non-conforming output. The social controls on the production of Wikipedia documents demonstrate both principles, using discussion pages, accessible edit histories, policies and guidelines, in contrast to traditional document control mechanisms such as workflow and authorization, to achieve both soft security and quality control.

In commercial security, soft security is often achieved through training of staff to manage the environment (1) to make disruptions more noticeable, (2) to make disruptions less socially acceptable, and (3) to create a perceived vested interest in the public.
