= Treaty of Commerce and Navigation =

1940 treaty between Iran and the Soviet Union

The Treaty of Commerce and Navigation was signed on March 25, 1940 between representatives of Iran and the Soviet Union. This accord helped to reinforce the tenets of the Treaty of Establishment, Commerce and Navigation. Based on the terms of the treaty, both signatories agreed to reinforce the 10-mile fishing limit for all commercial vessels in the Caspian Sea. Moreover, both signatories agreed that only Iranian and Russian commercial vessels were permitted to fish beyond the 10-mile nautical limit. The treaty did not include any clauses regarding the issue of seabed mining.

== See also ==
- List of treaties

== Sources ==
- Mehdiyoun, Kamyar. "Ownership of Oil and Gas Resources in the Caspian Sea." The American Journal of International Law. Vol. 94, No. 1 (January 2000), pp. 179–189.
