= Convention on the legal status of the Caspian Sea =

2018 international treaty

Convention on the Legal Status of the Caspian Sea
- Signed: August 12, 2018
- Location: Aktau, Kazakhstan
- Condition: 5 ratifications
- Signatories: Azerbaijan; Iran; Kazakhstan; Russia; Turkmenistan
- Depositary: Republic of Kazakhstan
- Languages: Azerbaijani, Persian, Kazakh, Russian, Turkmen and English

The Convention on the legal status of the Caspian Sea is a treaty signed in Aktau, Kazakhstan, on 12 August 2018 by the presidents of Russia, Kazakhstan, Azerbaijan, Iran and Turkmenistan.

== History ==
A dispute began after the dissolution of the Soviet Union in 1991, because while the Soviet Union (and subsequently Russia) and Iran kept in force their mutual 1921 and 1940 treaties, the new nations of Azerbaijan, Kazakhstan and Turkmenistan felt those treaties did not address the exploitation of the seabed, and thus a new UNCLOS treaty was necessary.

Due to the presence of numerous oil fields on the seabed of the Caspian Sea the question of legal status was very important; some countries even tried to develop fields in disputed regions, almost causing military incidents.

In order to elaborate a Convention on the legal status of the Caspian Sea, a special working group at the level of deputy foreign ministers was established in 1996 by the Caspian states. Negotiation of the document lasted more than 20 years before its signing on 12 August 2018 by the heads of five Caspian states at the summit in Kazakhstan. During the years of approval of the convention (1996–2018) between the parties were held 51 meetings of the special working groups, more than ten meetings of foreign ministers and four presidential summits in 2002 in Ashgabat, in 2007 in Tehran, in 2010 in Baku and in 2014 in Astrakhan.

The convention grants jurisdiction over 28 km (15 nmi) of territorial waters to each neighboring country, plus an additional 19 km (10 nmi) of exclusive fishing rights on the surface, the body of water is divided between the parties and each section belongs to the sovereignty of the respected party. No part of this body of water is considered international waters in the treaty as the five countries enclosing the body of water agreed to extend their borders beyond their coastlines. “The sovereignty of each Party shall extend beyond its land territory and internal waters to the adjacent sea belt called territorial waters, as well as to the seabed and subsoil thereof, and the airspace over it.”

== Gallery ==
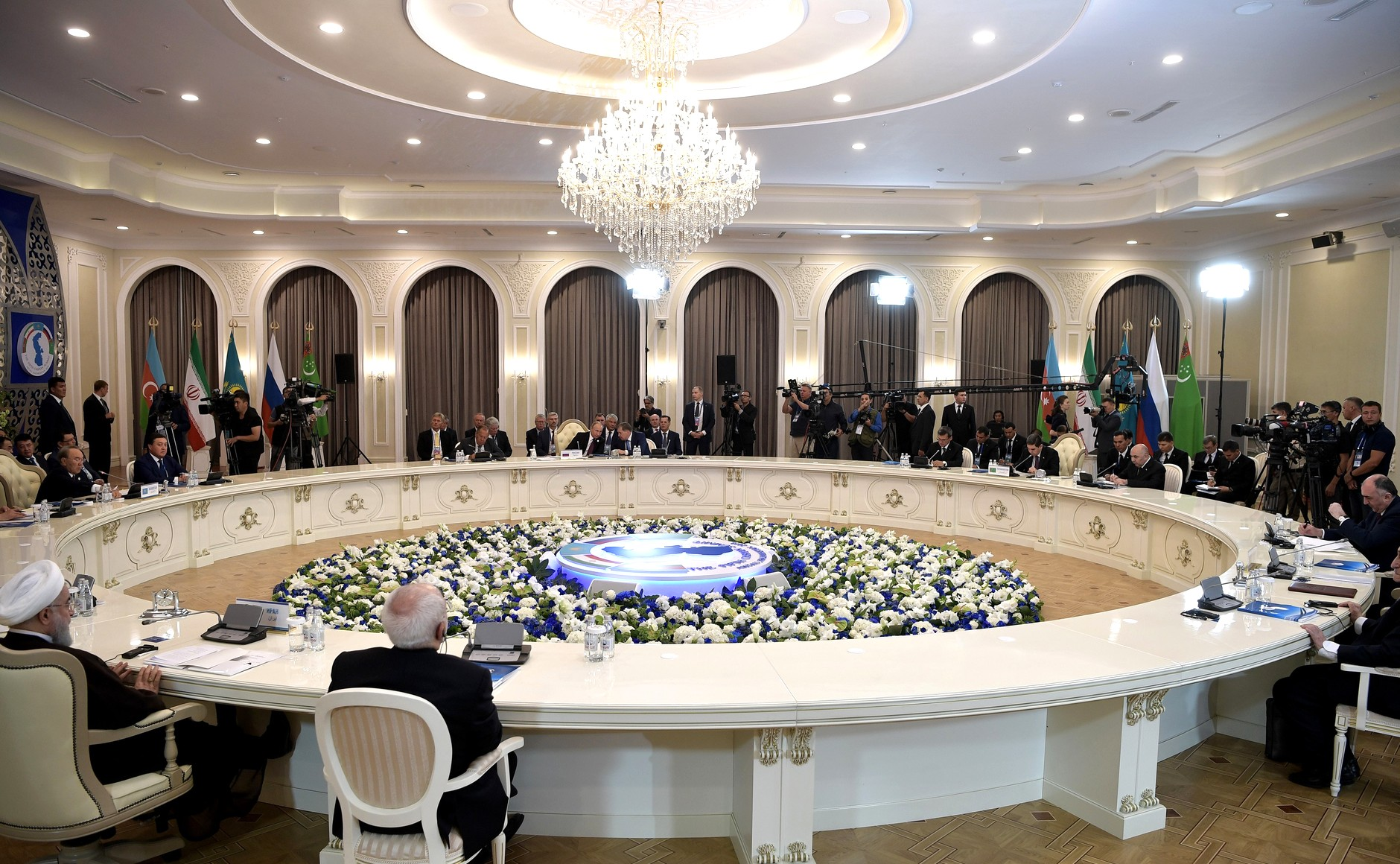
Fifth Caspian Summit where the Convention was signed

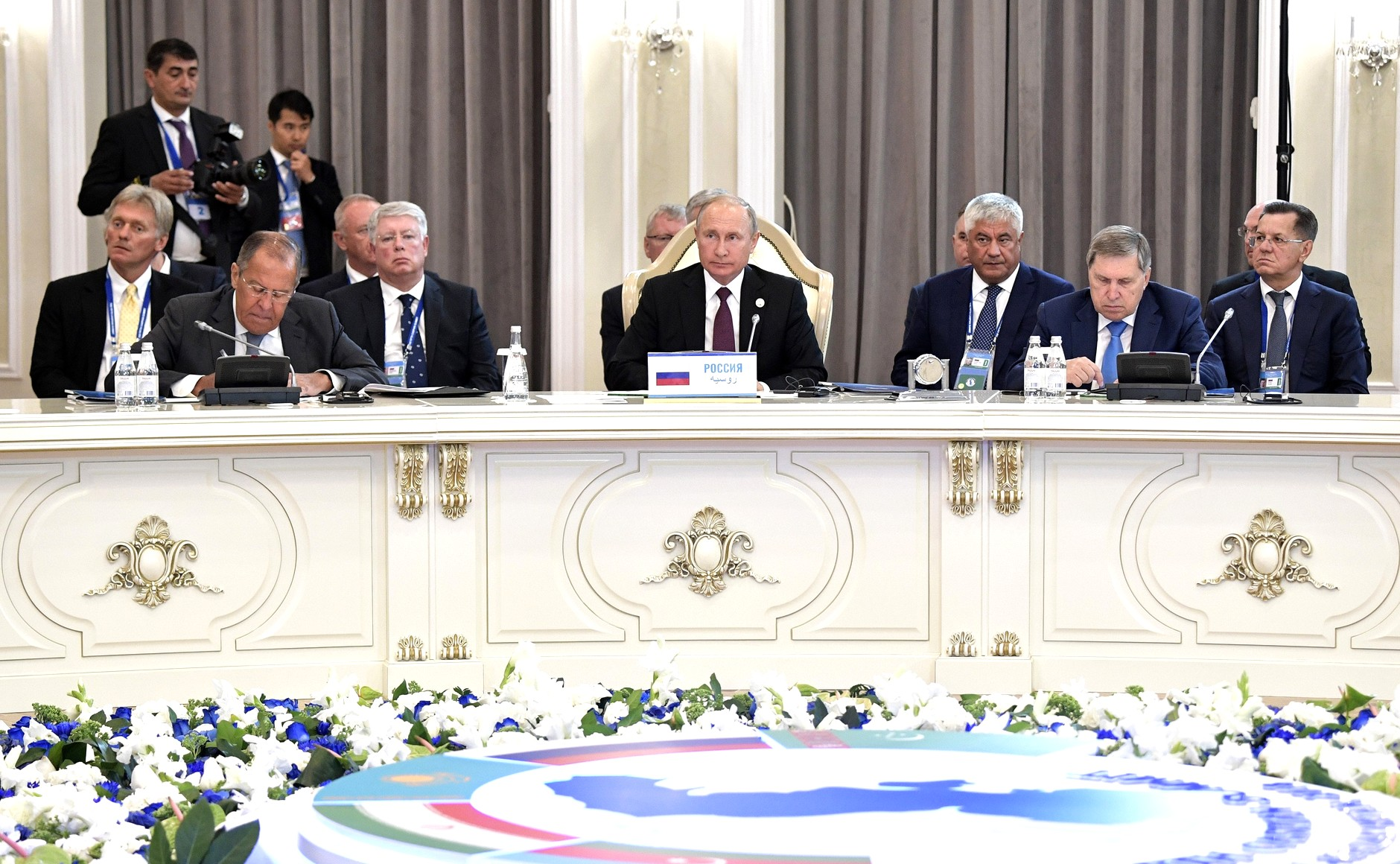
President of Russia Vladimir Putin at the summit
