= Eastern Europe =

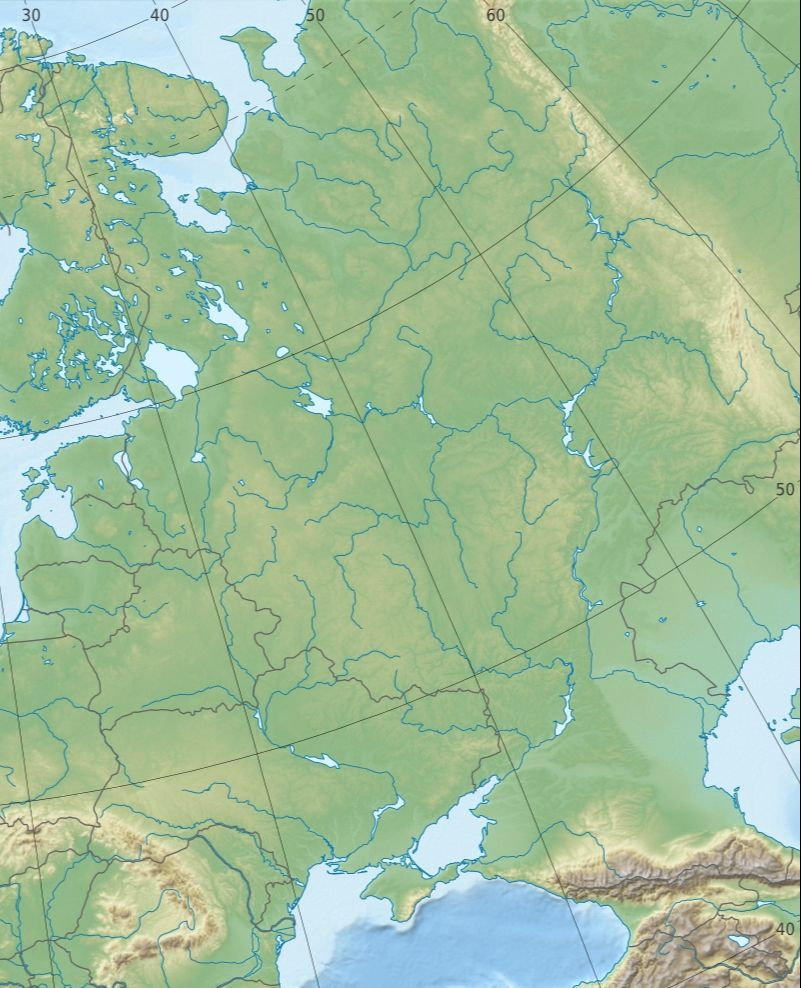
Relief map of Eastern Europe

Eastern Europe as defined by the United Nations geoscheme

Eastern Europe is a subregion of the European continent. As a largely ambiguous term, it has a wide range of geopolitical, geographical, ethnic, cultural and socio-economic connotations. Its eastern boundary is conventionally drawn along the Ural Mountains, while its western boundary is defined in many different ways and has shifted over time. Narrow definitions, in which Central and Southeast Europe are counted as separate regions, include Belarus, Russia and Ukraine. Broader definitions also include Moldova and Romania and some or all of the Balkans, though generally not Greece or East Thrace, and sometimes the Baltic states, the Visegrád Group countries and the Caucasus. Russia, by far the largest country in the world, is also the largest in the region.

The main socio-cultural characteristics of Eastern Europe have historically been defined largely by the traditions of the Slavs and by the influence of Eastern Christianity as it developed through the Eastern Roman Empire. The Cold War created another definition, in which "Eastern Europe" meant the communist states of the Soviet-dominated Eastern Bloc, separated from the West by the Iron Curtain.

The term is sometimes considered pejorative, through stereotypes of Eastern Europe as poorer and less developed than Western Europe, and the term Central and Eastern Europe is sometimes used as a more neutral grouping.

The region's history was shaped by the migrations of the Slavs in the 6th and 7th centuries, the Christianization of its peoples from both Rome and Constantinople, the Mongol invasions, and the rule of the Ottoman, Habsburg and Russian empires and the Polish–Lithuanian Commonwealth. After the First World War a series of new or restored states emerged, most of which were overrun by Nazi Germany and the Soviet Union during the Second World War, when much of the region became a battlefield and the main site of the Holocaust. From 1945 to 1989 most of the region was under communist rule, and after the Revolutions of 1989 many of its countries joined NATO and the European Union.

Much of the region lies on the East European Plain, which is drained by long rivers such as the Volga, the longest in Europe, the Dnieper and the Danube, and its climate becomes more continental towards the east. Most of its states are parliamentary or semi-presidential republics, and eleven of them belong to the European Union, while Russia and Belarus give their presidents wide powers and were classed by Freedom House as consolidated authoritarian regimes. Since joining the EU several countries have moved closer to its average income per person, while Russia's economy relies heavily on the export of fossil fuels. Large-scale emigration and low fertility have reduced the population of many countries since 1990. The region's cultural traditions include Orthodox icon painting, the literature of writers such as Alexander Pushkin and Adam Mickiewicz, the music of Frédéric Chopin and scientific work such as Dmitri Mendeleev's periodic table.

== Definitions ==
Traditional cultural borders of Europe: usage recommendation by the Standing Committee on Geographical Names, Germany

Several definitions of Eastern Europe exist in the early 21st century, but they often lack precision and may be anachronistic. The term has been called "fuzzy", an idea that is continually being redefined. The historian Larry Wolff has argued that the idea of "Eastern Europe" was created in the 18th century by thinkers of the Enlightenment, who cultivated an image of its backwardness, and the literary scholar Thomas Grob traces it primarily to the French Enlightenment. In a paper for the United Nations Group of Experts on Geographical Names, the geographer Peter Jordan wrote that "every assessment of spatial identities is essentially a social and cultural construct".

=== History of the concept ===
Ancient Greek geographers believed that Europe and Asia were separated by a river, the Tanais, which they thought flowed south from the Arctic into the Sea of Azov. Renaissance geographers still relied on these ancient ideas, with the Tanais, identified with the Don, dividing Europe from Asia, until Maciej Miechowita and Sigismund von Herberstein revised this view in their writings on Muscovy. Within Europe, the main cultural and political division for centuries ran between north and south. According to the historian Frithjof Benjamin Schenk, the model of a "civilized" South and a "barbarian" North lost its predominance only at the end of the 18th and the beginning of the 19th centuries, and until then British, French and German textbooks presented Russia mainly as a "Northern" country.

The term "Eastern Europe" appeared in geographical writing in the early 18th century, as in the title of a 1730 travel account by the Swedish officer Philip Johan von Strahlenberg, who had been in Siberia as a Russian prisoner of war. According to the geographer Mark Bassin, the Russian historian Vasily Tatishchev was the first to propose, in the 1730s, that the Ural Mountains replace the Tanais as the boundary between Europe and Asia, placing the core Russian lands in Europe and Siberia in Asia. Wolff describes a reorientation from the earlier "Northern" and "Southern" Europe by philosophes who viewed the continent from Paris, and Grob notes that Voltaire wrote of an Orient de l'Europe, a zone geographically in Europe that had not yet benefited from the new philosophy. After the Congress of Vienna, Conrad Malte-Brun counted only Russia and Poland as Europe orientale and Adriano Balbi proposed a two-part division into western and eastern Europe, while Russia moved on Europe's mental maps from the "North" to the "East".

In 1923 the Polish historian Oskar Halecki argued at the International Congress of Historical Sciences in Brussels that Eastern Europe was a subdivided region, much of which had always belonged culturally to Western civilization. After 1945 the term acquired a mainly political meaning in Western languages. In The Limits and Divisions of European History (1950) Halecki divided medieval and modern Europe into western, central and eastern regions, with a "West-Central" and an "East-Central" half in the middle. The Hungarian historian Jenő Szűcs, in his essay Sketch on the Three Regions of Europe (1983), distinguished Western Europe, East-Central Europe and an Eastern Europe largely identified with Russia. In 1984 the Czech writer Milan Kundera wrote of the "tragedy of Central Europe", setting Czechs, Poles and Hungarians apart from Russia and the Soviet Union. According to Diana Mishkova, Maria Todorova's Imagining the Balkans (1997) offered a "Balkanist" critique of the Balkans as an image in the Western mind, though Todorova also saw real features of the region in the Ottoman legacy.

=== Geographical ===
Regions used for statistical processing purposes by the United Nations Statistics Division: Eastern Europe Northern Europe Southern Europe Western Europe

Europe's eastern boundary is conventionally drawn along the Ural Mountains, but it does not mark a cultural, political or economic divide, and it has long been debated. Kazakhstan, which lies mainly in Central Asia, has a small portion west of the Ural River in the easternmost part of Europe.

In the west there is no geographical boundary between Eastern and Western Europe. The line is drawn on historical, religious and cultural grounds and has moved over time, so that Prague, Ljubljana and Zagreb are often thought of as "eastern" although they lie further west than Vienna.

For statistical purposes the United Nations counts Belarus, Bulgaria, the Czech Republic, Hungary, Moldova, Poland, Romania, Russia, Slovakia and Ukraine as Eastern Europe and places Estonia, Latvia and Lithuania in Northern Europe, noting that its groupings are made "for statistical convenience".

=== Religious and cultural influence ===
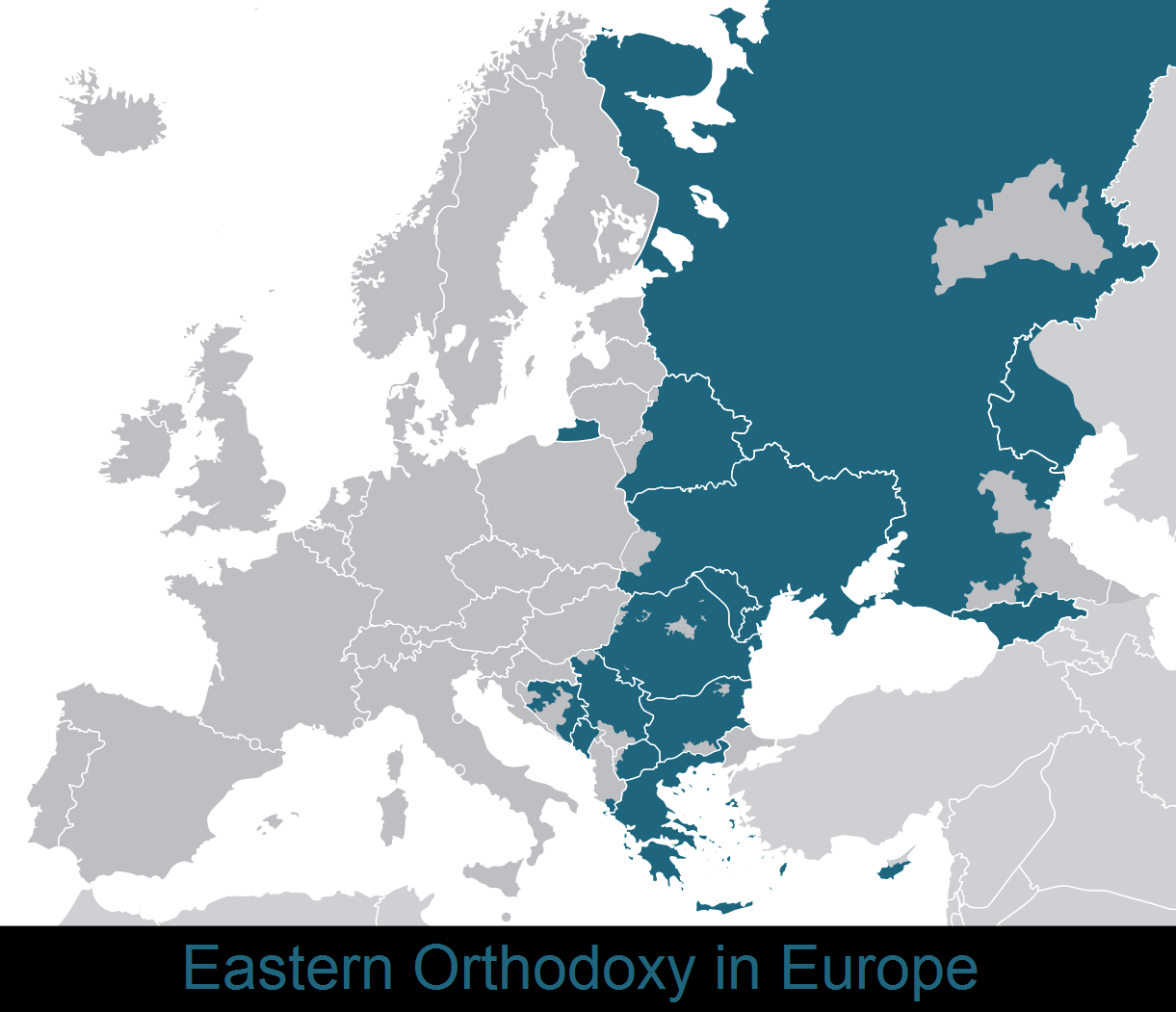
Map of Eastern Orthodoxy, the borderline of which is one cultural boundary in Europe

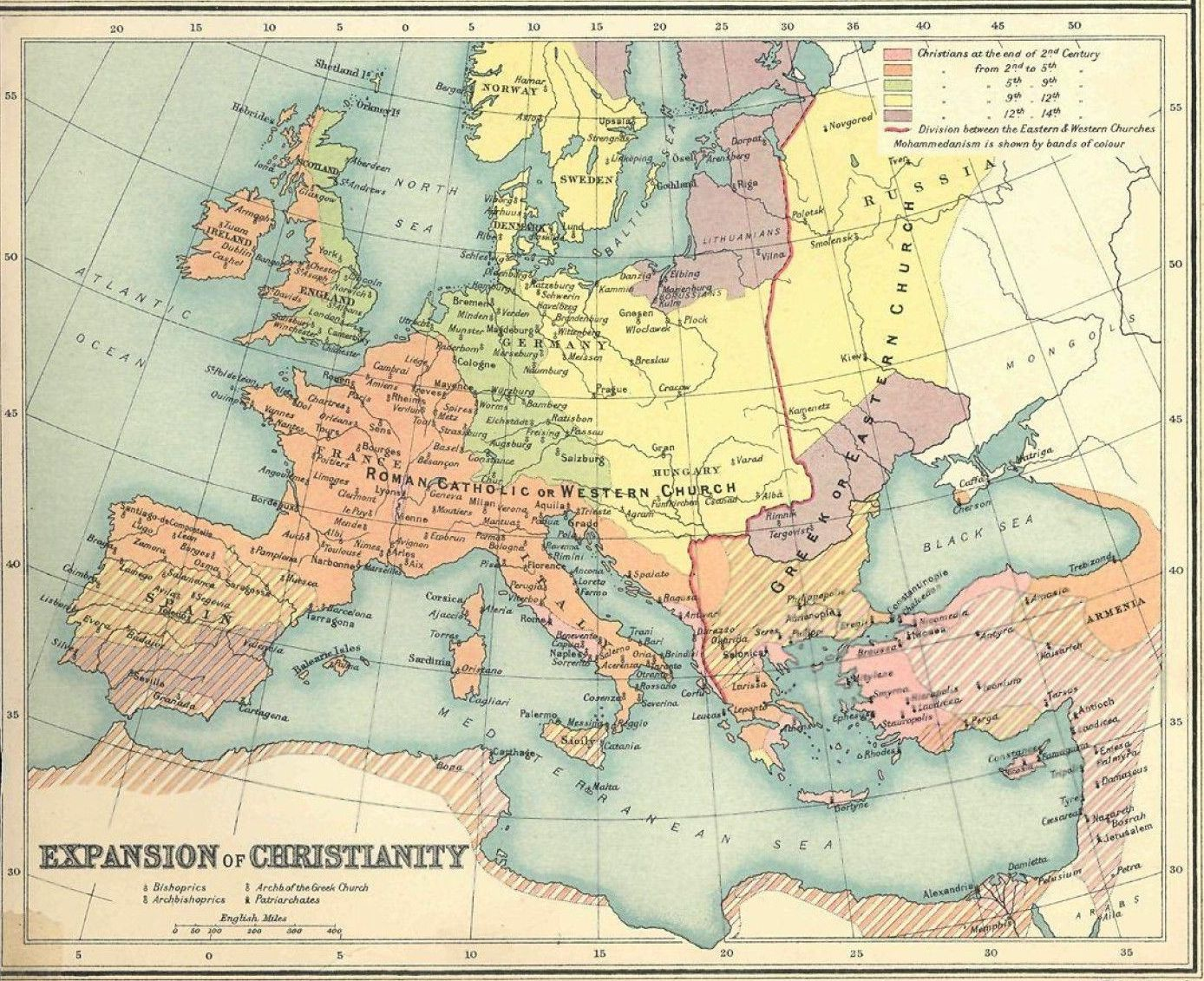
Expansion of Christianity

After the East–West Schism of 1054, significant parts of Eastern Europe developed cultural unity and resistance to Catholic Western and Central Europe within the framework of the Eastern Orthodox Church, Church Slavonic language and the Cyrillic alphabet.

A large section of Eastern Europe is formed by countries with dominant Orthodox churches, like Belarus, Bulgaria, Cyprus, Georgia, Greece, Moldova, Montenegro, North Macedonia, Romania, Russia, Serbia, and Ukraine, for instance, as well as Armenia, which is predominantly Armenian Apostolic. The Eastern Orthodox Church has played a prominent role in the history and culture of Eastern and Southeastern Europe. Eastern Catholic Churches, which keep Eastern rites but are in communion with Rome, became significant after the Union of Brest in 1596, when all but two of the Ukrainian Orthodox bishops in the Polish–Lithuanian Commonwealth accepted the primacy of the pope, although smaller groups had united with Rome earlier.

The schism refers to the historical break of communion and theology between the Eastern (Orthodox) and Western (Catholic) churches. Later developments meant that the divide was no longer solely between Catholic and Orthodox churches. From the 16th century, both Western and Eastern forms of Protestantism began to emerge in Europe.

Since the Great Schism of 1054, Europe has been divided between Catholic (and later additionally Protestant) churches in the West, and the Eastern Orthodox Christian churches in the east. The religious cleavage causes Eastern Orthodox countries to be often associated with Eastern Europe. This divide is an imperfect guide, however. Greece, for example, is overwhelmingly Orthodox, but the United Nations classes it as part of Southern Europe. The historian Ian Armour notes that use of the Cyrillic alphabet is not a strict marker of Eastern Europe either, since the Latin alphabet is used from Croatia to Poland.

=== Cold War usage ===
During the Cold War, "Eastern Europe" was used more or less as a synonym for the Soviet-dominated Eastern Bloc and the Warsaw Pact. This usage still shapes how the term is understood, although historians and social scientists generally regard definitions based on it as outdated.

=== EuroVoc ===
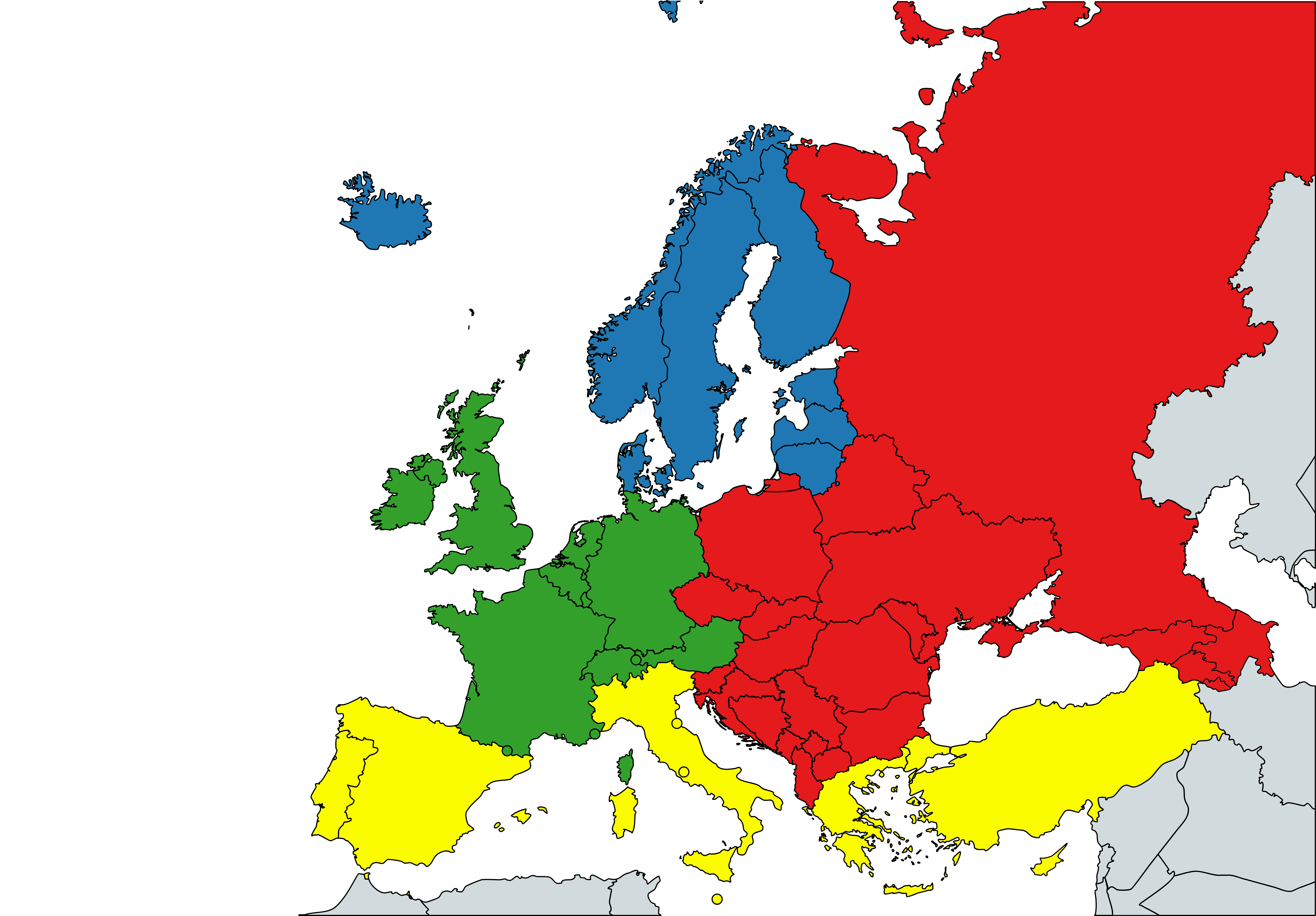
European sub-regions according to EuroVoc: Central and Eastern Europe Western Europe Southern Europe Northern Europe

EuroVoc, a multilingual thesaurus maintained by the Publications Office of the European Union, groups Albania, Belarus, Bosnia and Herzegovina, Bulgaria, Croatia, the Czech Republic, Hungary, Kosovo, Moldova, Montenegro, North Macedonia, Poland, Romania, Russia, Serbia, Slovakia, Slovenia and Ukraine as "Central and Eastern Europe", together with a subgroup of Caucasus countries. Estonia, Latvia and Lithuania are not part of this group.

=== Regional classifications ===
In broadest definition, the countries are Albania, Armenia, Azerbaijan, Belarus, Bosnia and Herzegovina, Bulgaria, Croatia, the Czech Republic, Estonia, Hungary, Kosovo, Latvia, Lithuania, Moldova, Montenegro, North Macedonia, Poland, Romania, Russia, Serbia, Slovakia, Slovenia, Ukraine and, in rare cases, Greece, which is more commonly classified differently, albeit less commonly placed in Eastern Europe, all of which can be classified into 6 categories.

Despite being predominantly located in West Asia, the South Caucasus nations of Armenia, Azerbaijan, and Georgia are often categorized as part of Eastern Europe.

==== Baltic states ====
Estonia, Latvia and Lithuania, known together as the Baltic states, lie in north-eastern Europe on the eastern shore of the Baltic Sea. The United Nations places them in Northern Europe, and EuroVoc does not include them in its Central and Eastern European group. They are sometimes counted as part of Central Europe instead.

- Estonia
- Latvia
- Lithuania

==== Caucasus states ====
The South Caucasus nations of Armenia, Azerbaijan, and Georgia are included in definitions or histories of Eastern Europe. They are located in the transition zone of Eastern Europe and Western Asia. They participate in the European Union's Eastern Partnership program, the Euronest Parliamentary Assembly, and are members of the Council of Europe, which specifies that all three have political and cultural connections to Europe. In January 2002, the European Parliament noted that Armenia, Azerbaijan, and Georgia may enter the EU in the future. Georgia and Armenia are seeking EU membership, with Georgia also seeking NATO membership alongside.

- Armenia
- Azerbaijan
- Georgia

There are two de facto republics with limited recognition in the South Caucasus region that exist under the presence of Russian military. Both states participate in the Community for Democracy and Rights of Nations:

- Abkhazia
- South Ossetia

Former republics with limited recognition:

- Chechen Republic of Ichkeria (1991–2000) – existed in former Soviet territory until it was driven into exile during the Second Chechen War
- Republic of Artsakh (1991–2023) – breakaway state from Azerbaijan that ceased to exist by 1 January 2024

==== Post-Soviet states ====
Some European republics of the former Soviet Union are considered a part of Eastern Europe:

- Belarus
- Moldova (sometimes considered a part of the Balkans or Southeast Europe)
- Russia
- Ukraine

Unrecognized states:

- Transnistria

==== Central Europe ====
Whether countries are called "eastern", "central" or "east-central" Europe is often disputed, and countries in the region compete to be seen as western. Czechs, for example, firmly reject being counted as part of Eastern Europe. The Czech Republic, Hungary, Poland and Slovakia cooperate in the Visegrád Group, and Romania has been described as lying in "South-East Central Europe". Some commentators label the following countries Central European, while others still consider them Eastern European.

- Czech Republic
- Croatia (also counted in Southeast Europe)
- Hungary
- Lithuania (also counted in Northern Europe)
- Poland
- Romania (also counted in Southeast Europe)
- Serbia (usually counted in Southeast Europe)
- Slovakia
- Slovenia (also counted in Southeast Europe)

==== Southeastern Europe / Balkan states ====
The Balkans are usually described as comprising Albania, Bosnia and Herzegovina, Bulgaria, Croatia, Kosovo, Montenegro, North Macedonia, Romania, Serbia and Slovenia, and many descriptions also include Greece and the European part of Turkey. Moldova is included under some definitions, and the term "Southeast Europe" is increasingly used for the region, without agreement on which countries it includes. Most of these countries are also counted in some groupings of Central and Eastern Europe, and Cyprus and Hungary are sometimes included in Southeast Europe for cultural and historical reasons.

- Albania
- Bosnia and Herzegovina
- Bulgaria
- Croatia
- Greece
- Kosovo (partially recognized)
- Montenegro
- North Macedonia
- Romania
- Serbia
- Slovenia
- Turkey (East Thrace)

== History ==
=== Antiquity and the Migration Period ===
Ancient kingdoms of the region included Orontid Armenia, Caucasian Albania, Colchis and Iberia (not to be confused with the Iberian Peninsula in Western Europe), of which the former two were the predecessor states of Armenia and Azerbaijan respectively, while the latter two were the predecessor states of modern-day Georgia. These peripheral kingdoms were, either from the start or later on, incorporated into various Iranian empires, including the Achaemenid Persian, Parthian, and Sassanid Persian Empires. Parts of the Balkans and some more northern areas were ruled by the Achaemenid Persians as well, including Thrace, Paeonia, Macedon, and most of the Black Sea coastal regions of Romania, Ukraine, and Russia. Owing to the rivalry between the Parthian Empire and Rome, and later between Byzantium and the Sassanid Persians, the Parthians would invade the region several times, although it was never able to hold the area, unlike the Sassanids who controlled most of the Caucasus during their entire rule.

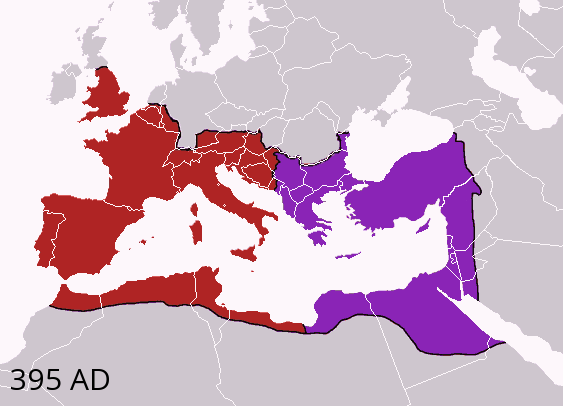
The Eastern and Western Roman Empire at the death of Theodosius I in 395. The Western Roman Empire fell in 476 while the Eastern lasted until 1453.

The earliest distinctions between east and west in Europe go back to the Roman Republic. As Rome expanded, the mainly Greek-speaking and highly urbanized eastern provinces stood apart from the Latin-speaking west, and the split was later reinforced by the political division of the Roman Empire. The Western Roman Empire collapsed in the 5th century, while the Eastern Roman Empire, called the "Byzantine Empire" in the West, survived for another 1,000 years.

The steppe north of the Black Sea was held by a succession of Iranian-speaking nomads, the Cimmerians, then the Scythians from the 7th century BC and the Sarmatians from the 3rd century BC. The Huns invaded from the east about 370, and between 550 and 575 the Avars settled the Hungarian plain and built an empire that reached from the Adriatic to the Baltic.

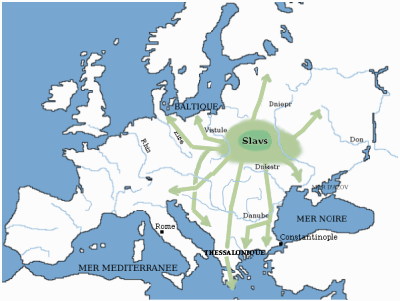
Origin and dispersion of the Slavs between the 5th and 10th centuries

Slavic-speaking peoples entered the historical record in the 6th century and spread west to the Elbe, south into Bohemia, Moravia and the Balkans, and north along the upper Dnieper. Procopius claimed that from the reign of Justinian I the Sclaveni, the Antes and the Huns overran Illyricum and Thrace almost every year, and John of Ephesus wrote in 584 that the Slavs "overran the whole of Greece, and the country of the Thessalonians, and all Thrace" and settled there. With Byzantium tied down by its wars with Persia, Slavs settled throughout the Balkans as far as the Aegean by the late 7th century. A 2025 ancient DNA study found that the expansion involved a large-scale movement of people, which replaced more than 80 percent of the earlier gene pool in eastern Germany, Poland and Croatia, though the newcomers did not form a majority everywhere in the Balkans.

In 623 or 624 the Slavs on the western edge of the Avar realm rose against it and made Samo, a Frankish merchant, their king. In 631 or 632 they defeated the Frankish king Dagobert I at Wogastisburg. By about 600 the Slavs were the dominant people of the East European Plain, and East Slavic tribes such as the Polianians around Kyiv spread north to the upper Volga. In the 8th and 9th centuries many of them paid tribute to the Turkic Khazars.

=== Middle Ages ===
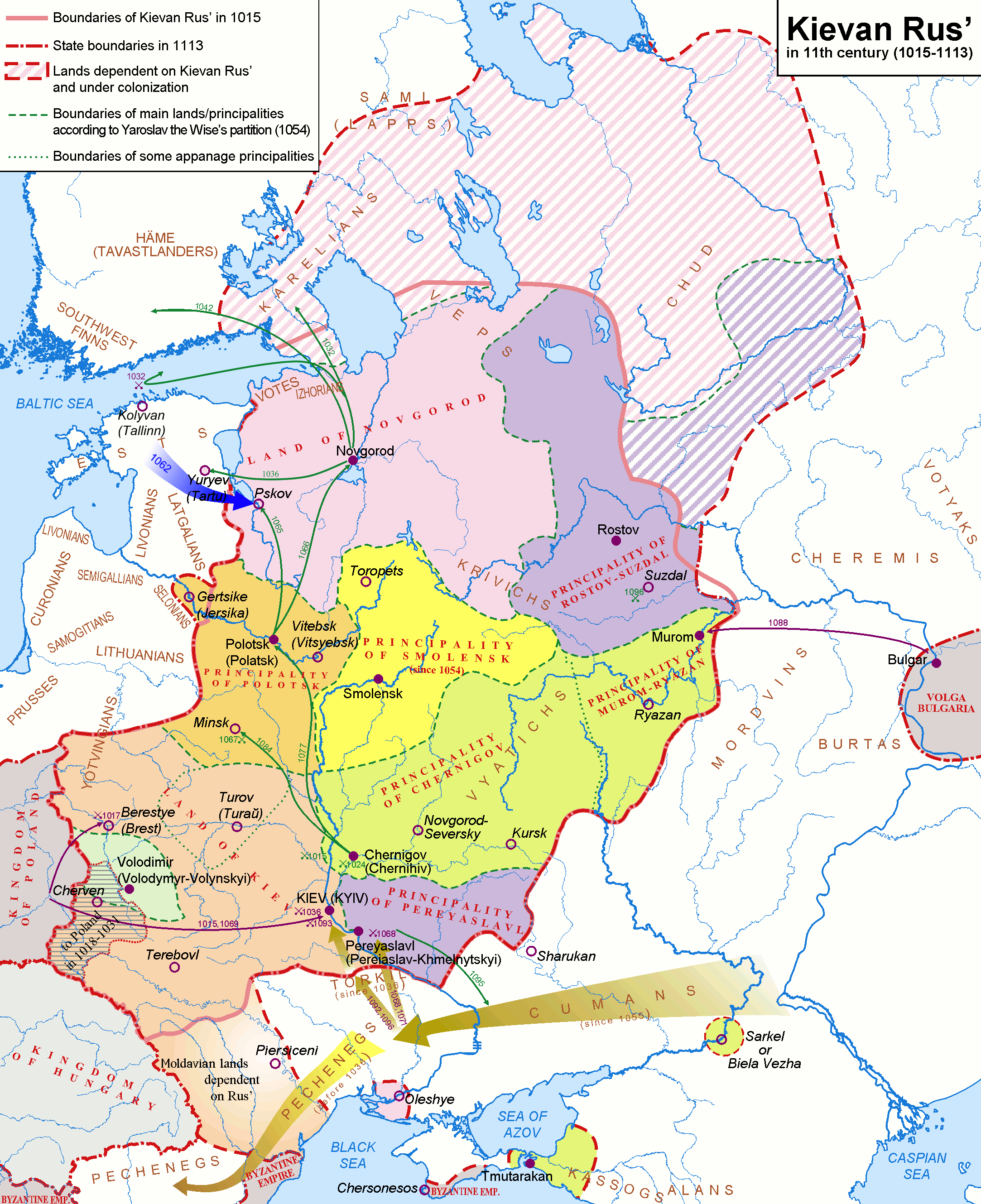
Kievan Rus' in 1015–1113

The Bulgars, a steppe people usually considered to be of Turkic origin, crossed the Danube under Asparuh and settled among the Slavic tribes there. A treaty of 681 recognizing their rule marks the beginning of the Bulgarian state, and by the early 11th century the Bulgars had taken on the language of the Slavic majority. Charlemagne crushed the Avars about 800. Great Moravia rose in the 830s and broke up in the early 10th century, Croatia became an independent state in the 9th century, and the Magyars crossed the Carpathians about 895. In 882 Oleg made Kyiv the capital of Kievan Rus', the first East Slavic state, and in 964–965 Sviatoslav destroyed the Khazar capitals.

Christianity reached the Slavs from both Constantinople and Rome. Cyril and Methodius brought a Slavonic liturgy and the Glagolitic alphabet to Great Moravia in 863, and Boris I of Bulgaria was baptized in 864 and later made Slavonic the language of his church and state. Poland, whose ruler Mieszko I was baptized in 966, and Hungary, whose king Stephen I was crowned in 1000, took up Latin Christianity. In Kievan Rus', Vladimir agreed about 987 to accept baptism and marry the sister of Emperor Basil II in return for military aid, seized Chersonesus to make the Byzantines keep the bargain, and in 988–989 ordered his people to be baptized.

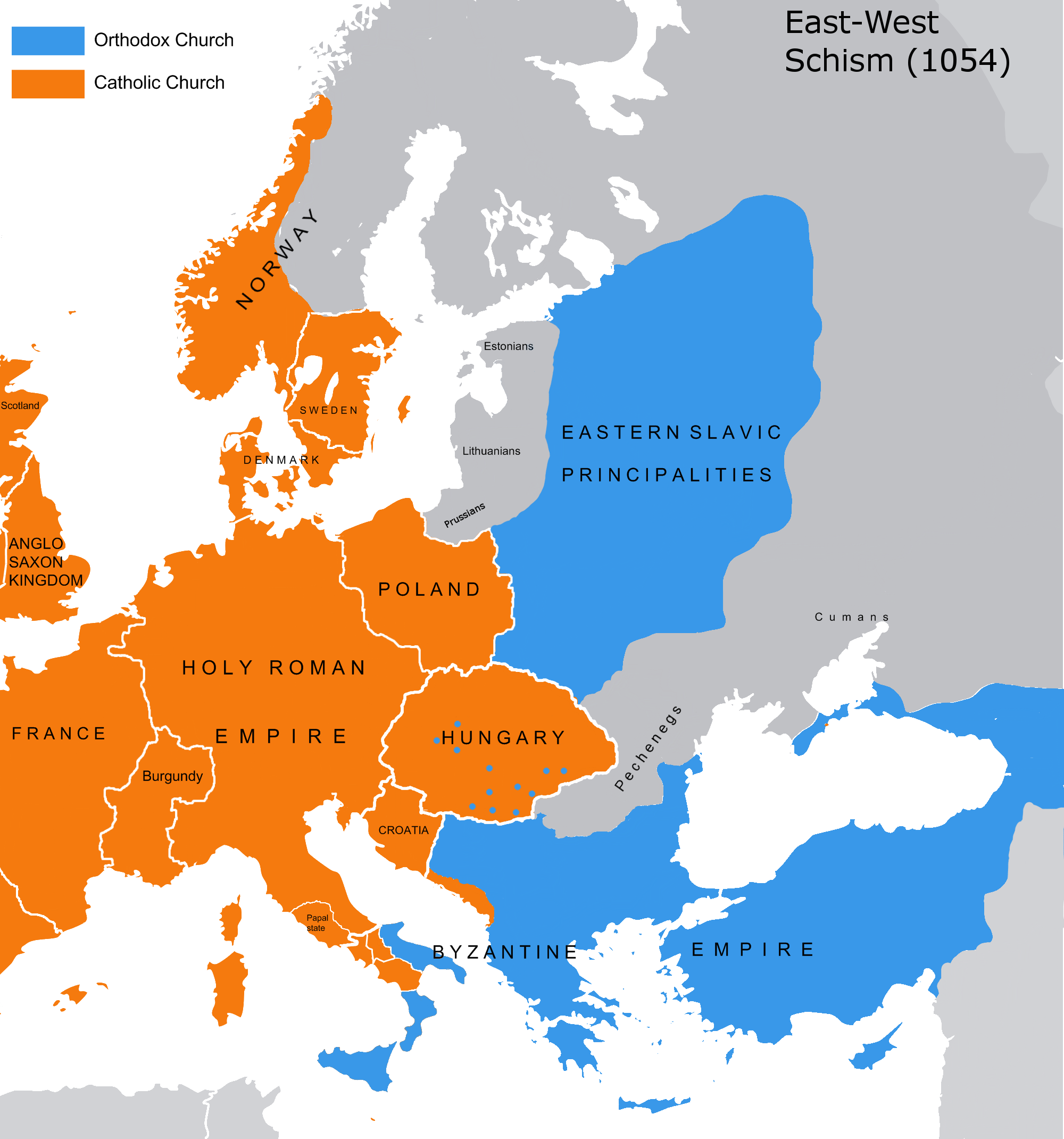
Eastern and Western Christian allegiances in Europe in 1054

The churches of Rome and Constantinople had been growing apart since the 5th century, and the mutual excommunications of 1054 marked their final separation in the Great Schism. In 1204 the Fourth Crusade captured Constantinople and set up a Latin Empire that lasted until 1261. The Slavs remain divided between the Orthodox and Catholic traditions, which largely match their use of the Cyrillic and Latin alphabets.

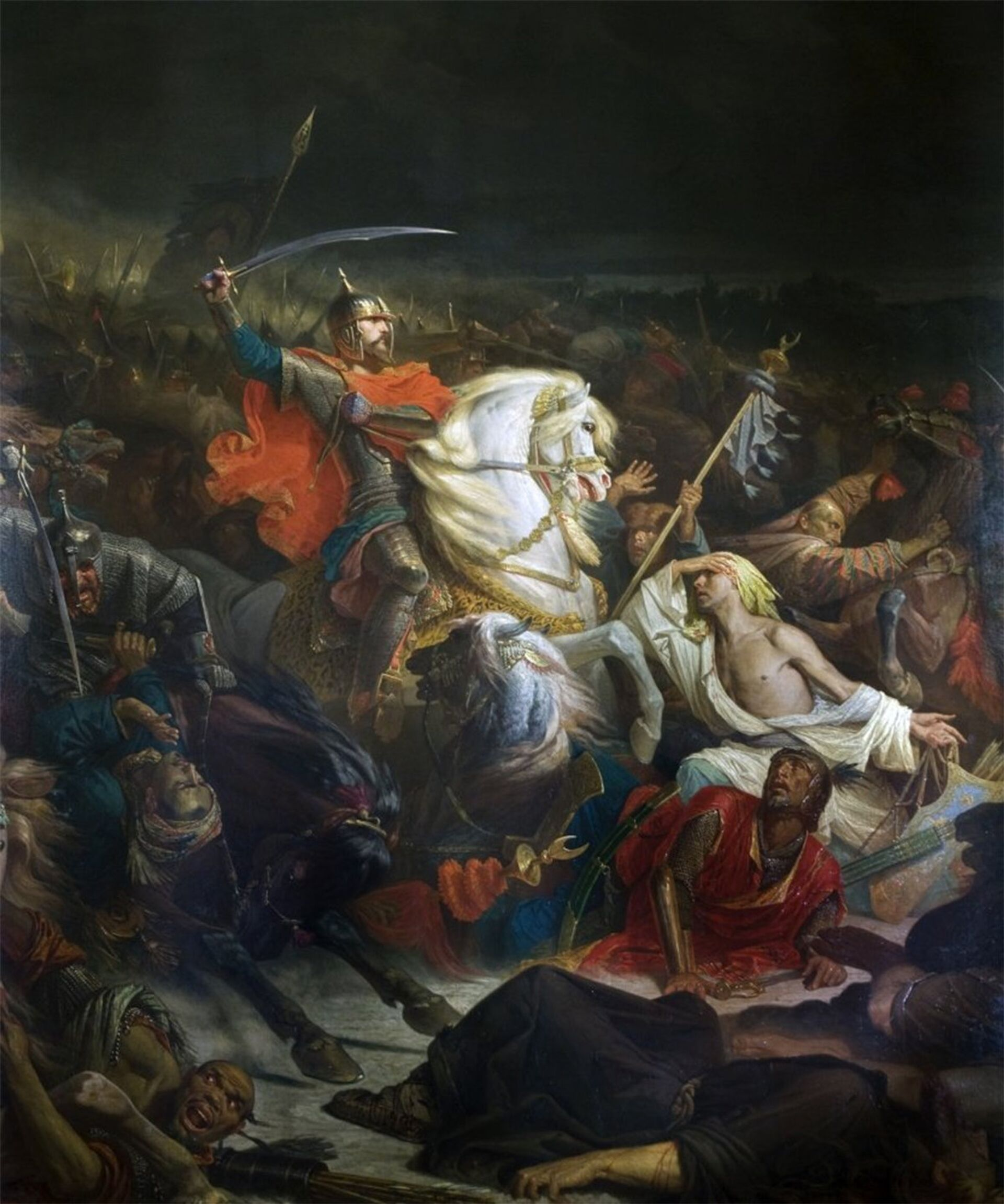
Dmitry Donskoy at the Battle of Kulikovo, painting by Adolphe Yvon, 1849

Much of Eastern Europe was invaded and occupied by the Mongols. Batu took the towns of northern Rus' in 1237–1238 and captured Kyiv in December 1240, and in 1241 his armies defeated the Poles at Legnica and the Hungarians at the Sajó. His state, the Golden Horde, held the Rus' principalities as tributary vassals. It declined after the mid-14th century, Dmitry Donskoy of Moscow defeated the Tatar leader Mamai at Kulikovo in 1380, and in the 15th century the Horde broke up into separate khanates.

During the Ostsiedlung of the 12th and 13th centuries, German settlers moved east of the Elbe and Saale, encouraged by German princes and by the rulers of Bohemia and Silesia. Towns in Poland, and later in the Ruthenian lands under Polish and Lithuanian rule, received charters of self-government modelled on Magdeburg law.

=== Early modern period (1453–1795) ===
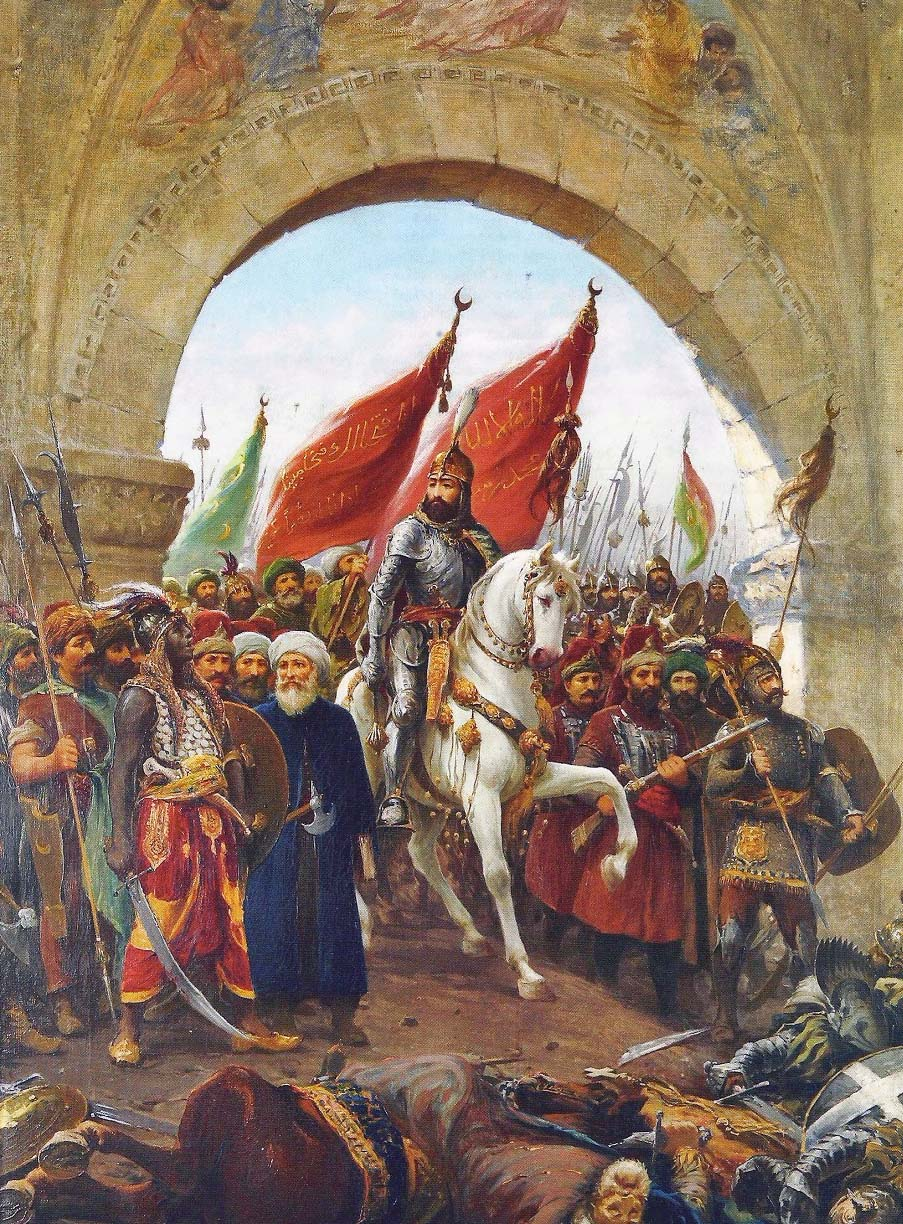
Mehmed II entering Constantinople, painting by Fausto Zonaro

The Ottoman capture of Constantinople on 29 May 1453 ended the Byzantine Empire. After its fall, Philotheus, hegumen of the Eleazar Monastery near Pskov, wrote to the grand princes of Moscow in the early 16th century that "two Romes have fallen, the third one stands, and a fourth will never be". The doctrine of Moscow as the Third Rome, the last successor to Rome and Byzantium, was embraced by Muscovy's rulers and church by the mid-16th century and long shaped how Russians saw themselves. Ivan III, who had married Sophia, a niece of the last Byzantine emperor, brought Byzantine titles, rituals and emblems such as the double-headed eagle to his court and was the first Muscovite ruler to call himself tsar. The Ottomans had already conquered Bulgaria and defeated Serbia at Kosovo in 1389. In 1526 Suleiman destroyed the Hungarian army at the Mohács, and King Louis II died in its aftermath. After the fall of Buda in 1541 Hungary was divided between the Habsburgs, the Ottomans and the Ottoman vassal principality of Transylvania. Ottoman expansion in Central Europe ended at the siege of Vienna in 1683, which was broken by a relief army under the Polish king John III Sobieski, and by the Treaty of Karlowitz in 1699 the Ottomans ceded most of Hungary, Transylvania and Croatia to Austria. In Bohemia the Habsburgs crushed the Protestant estates at the Battle of White Mountain in 1620 and imposed an authoritarian government that lasted until 1918.

Union of Lublin by Jan Matejko, 1869

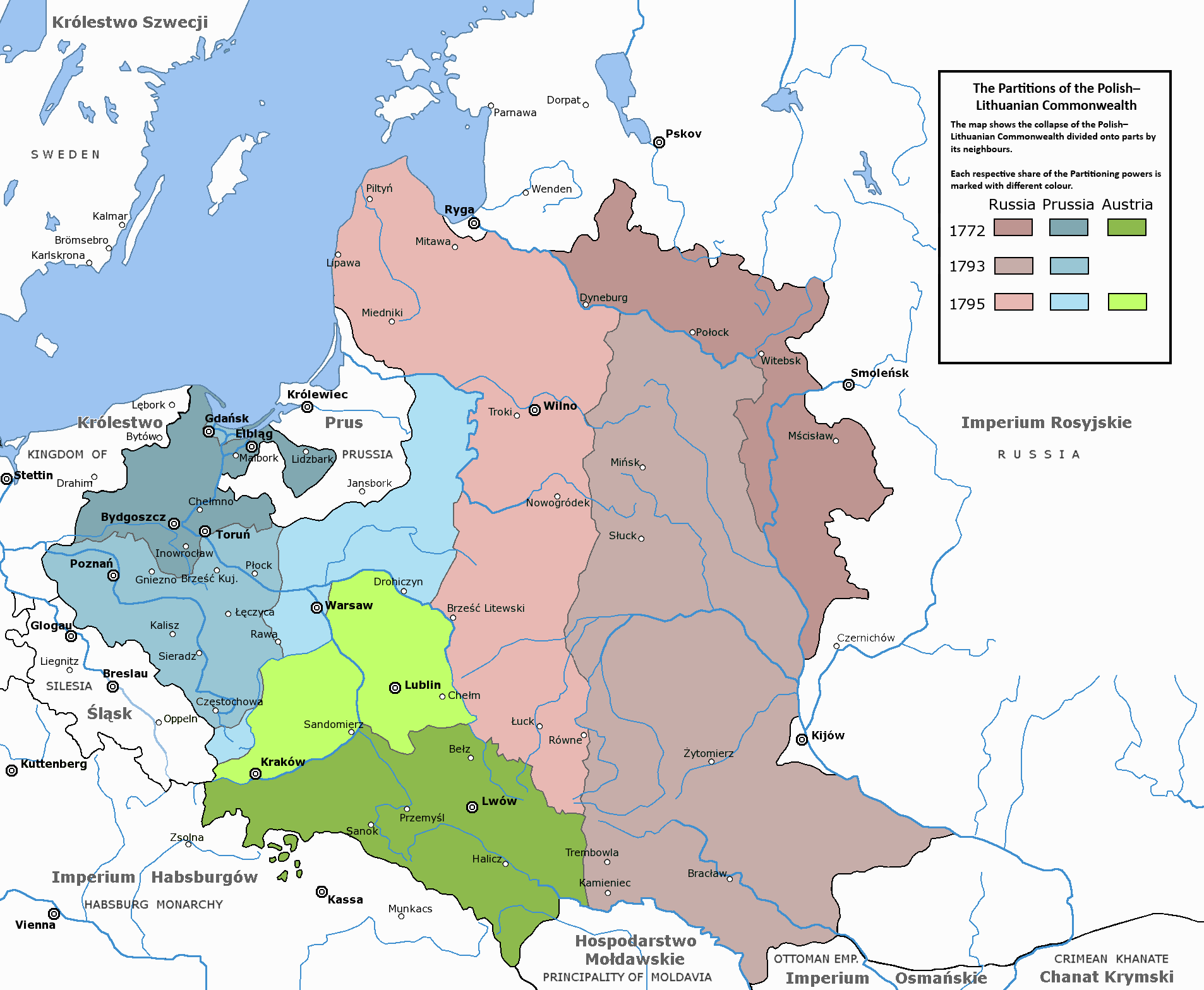
The Polish–Lithuanian Commonwealth and its partitions in 1772, 1793 and 1795

Poland and Lithuania, joined in a personal union since 1385, became a single Commonwealth under the Union of Lublin in 1569. Its kings were elected, and its parliament, the Sejm, required unanimity, which allowed any noble to block its work. A Cossack uprising led by Bohdan Khmelnytsky in 1648 turned into a long war against the Commonwealth, and in 1654 Khmelnytsky accepted the protection of the Muscovite tsar. By 1655 Muscovy and Sweden had overrun most of the Commonwealth in the period known as the Deluge, and by the mid-18th century it was a virtual Russian protectorate. A reform constitution of 3 May 1791 was overturned within a year, and the state was then divided in three partitions. Russia, Prussia and Austria took part in the first in 1772 and the last in 1795, and Russia and Prussia alone in the second in 1793.

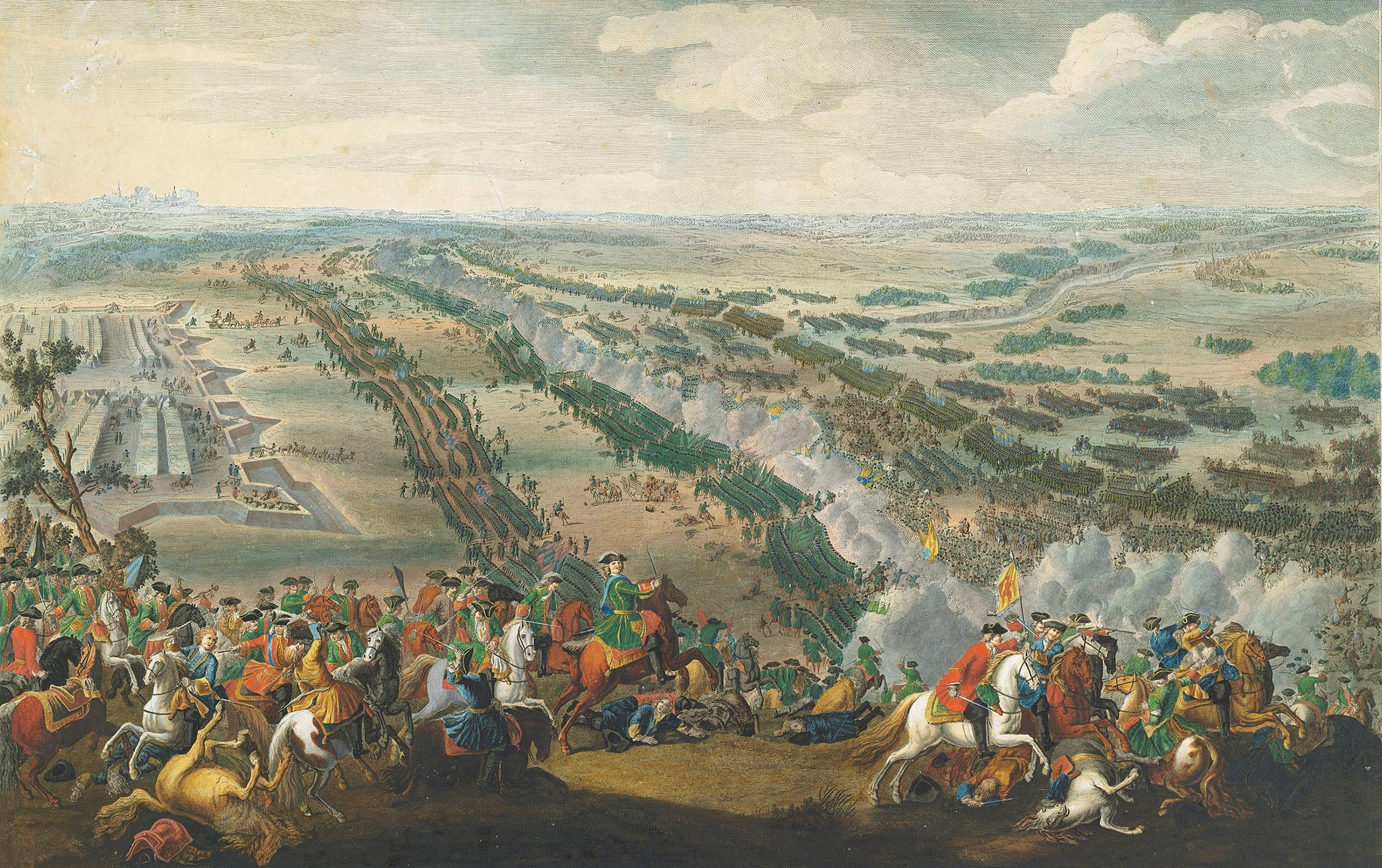
The Battle of Poltava by Pierre-Denis Martin, 1726

Muscovy ended Mongol overlordship in 1480. Ivan IV, who took the title of tsar in 1547, and annexed the Khanate of Kazan in 1552. After the Time of Troubles (1598–1613) the Romanov dynasty came to power. Peter the Great defeated Sweden in the Great Northern War and proclaimed the Russian Empire in 1721, and under Catherine II Russia reached the Black Sea and annexed Crimea in 1783.

While serfdom declined in Western Europe, it spread in the east. From the late Middle Ages, landlords from eastern Germany and Poland to Muscovy took back peasant holdings and increased labour services to grow grain for Western markets, and the status of the peasantry fell sharply. In the late 16th and early 17th centuries the region nevertheless enjoyed a relatively high standard of living, a period sometimes called the east-central European golden age. Numeracy was low in the 17th century, especially in Russia, and rose in the 18th, growing fastest where women had more autonomy.

=== Long 19th century (1795–1914) ===
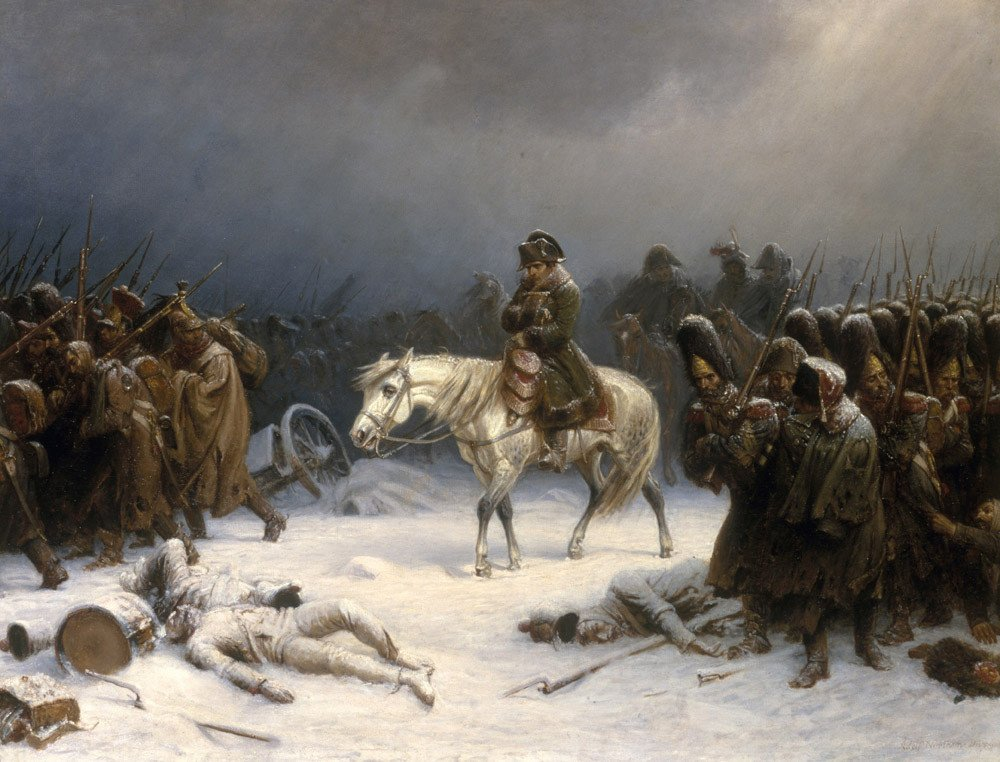
Napoleon's Retreat from Moscow by Adolph Northen, 1851

In June 1812 Napoleon invaded Russia with about 600,000 troops, and fewer than 30,000 of them returned. Russian armies pursued the French as far as Paris, and at the Congress of Vienna in 1815 Alexander I helped redraw the map of Europe. The Congress replaced the Duchy of Warsaw, which Napoleon had created in 1807, with a Polish kingdom ruled by the Russian tsar. The uprising of 1830–1831 cost the kingdom its constitution and army, and after the January Uprising of 1863–1864 Russia abolished it altogether. In the Habsburg lands, the revolutions of 1848 brought a Hungarian government under Lajos Batthyány, but the Hungarian army surrendered in August 1849 after Russian troops had joined the Austrians. Weakened by defeat in 1866, Austria concluded the Compromise of 1867 with Hungary, which created the Dual Monarchy of Austria-Hungary and gave Hungary control of its internal affairs.

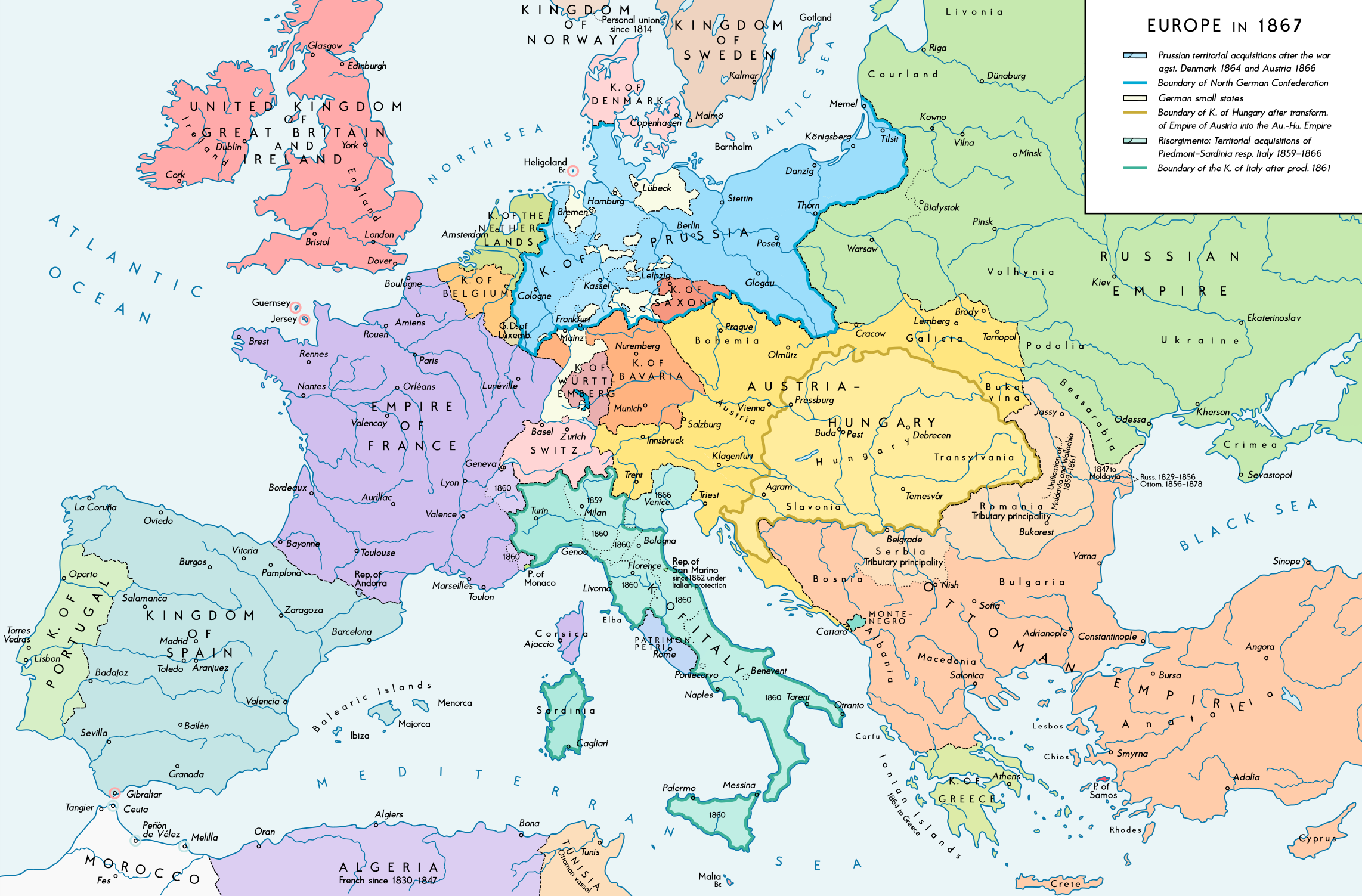
Europe in 1867

In the Balkans, Ottoman rule receded. Moldavia and Wallachia elected Alexandru Ioan Cuza as their joint prince in 1859, and the united principalities took the name Romania in 1861. After the Russo-Turkish War of 1877–1878, the Congress of Berlin created an autonomous Bulgaria, far smaller than the one agreed at San Stefano, and recognized Romania's independence, while Austria-Hungary occupied Bosnia and Herzegovina. In 1908 Austria-Hungary annexed Bosnia and Herzegovina and Bulgaria declared full independence. In the Balkan Wars the Balkan states fought the Ottoman Empire in 1912, and in 1913 Bulgaria attacked Serbia and was defeated after Greece, Romania and the Ottomans joined the war against it.

Serfdom ended in stages. Peasants in the Habsburg lands were freed from serfdom in the late 18th century, and Cuza's land law abolished it in Romania. In 1861 the emancipation reform of Alexander II freed about 20 million privately held serfs in Russia, who had to make redemption payments to the state for almost fifty years, and Russian Poland followed in 1864. Industrialization came late and unevenly. Mining and manufacturing grew in Russian Poland and Silesia in the later 19th century, and in the 1890s, under the finance minister Sergei Witte, Russia's output of coal, iron, steel and oil tripled and the Trans-Siberian Railway was built, although grain output and exports did not grow significantly.

=== World War I ===
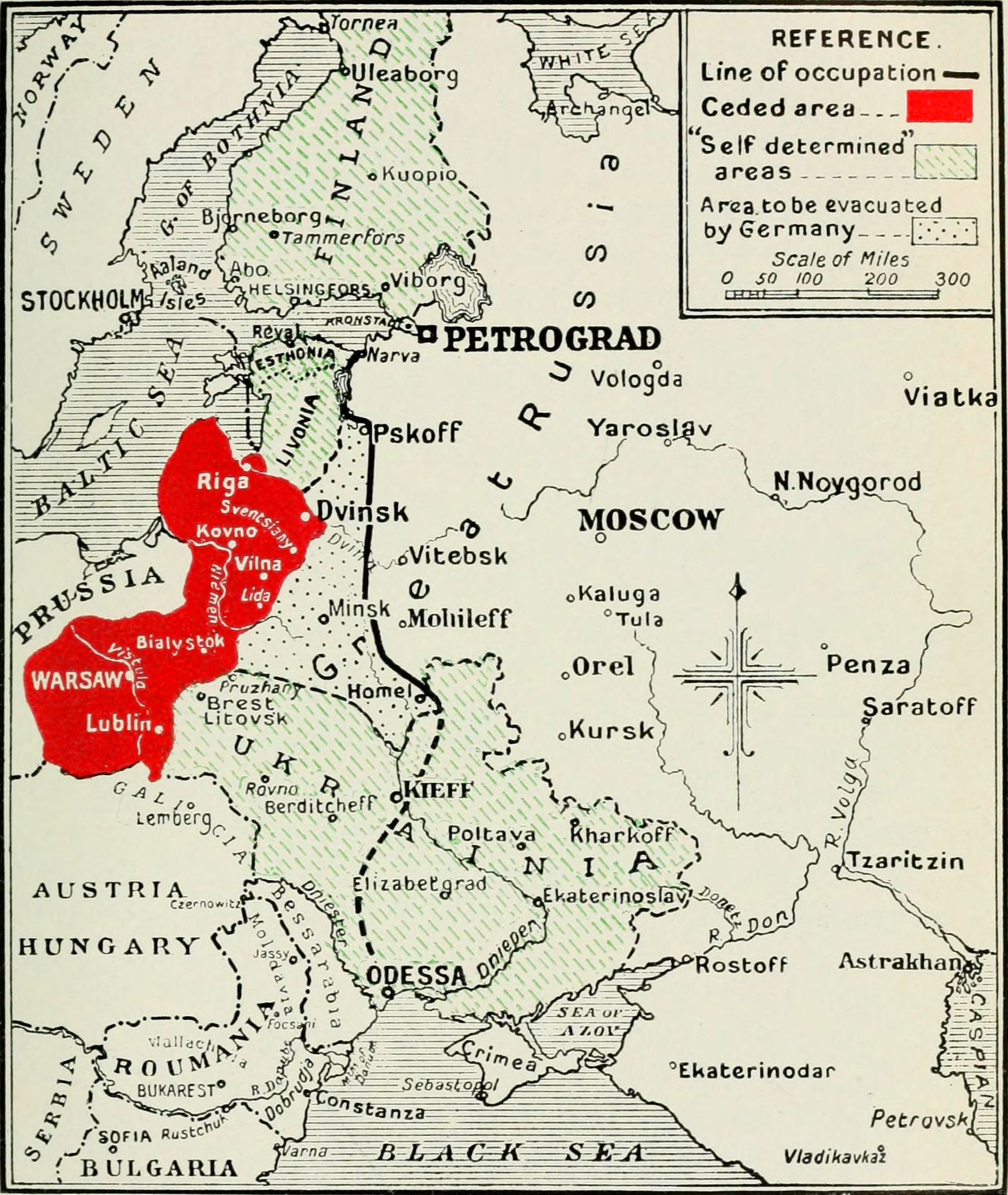
Territory lost by Russia under the Treaty of Brest-Litovsk, 1918

World War I began a month after the assassination of Archduke Franz Ferdinand in Sarajevo on 28 June 1914, when Austria-Hungary declared war on Serbia. Russia, drawn in by the Serbian crisis, invaded East Prussia, but one of its two invading armies was almost destroyed at Tannenberg. Its forces advanced into Galicia and came close to Kraków, but in 1915 a German and Austrian offensive drove them out of Galicia and Poland. After heavy fighting around Gorlice and Przemyśl, the Germans held all of Russian Poland, including Warsaw, by the end of 1915. A Russian offensive against Austria-Hungary in 1916 drew German troops from the west. About two million Poles served in the armies of the three partitioning powers, and about 450,000 of them died. Piłsudski's legions fought on the side of the Central Powers against Russia, and in 1916 the German and Austrian emperors proclaimed a Kingdom of Poland on a small part of the former Commonwealth.

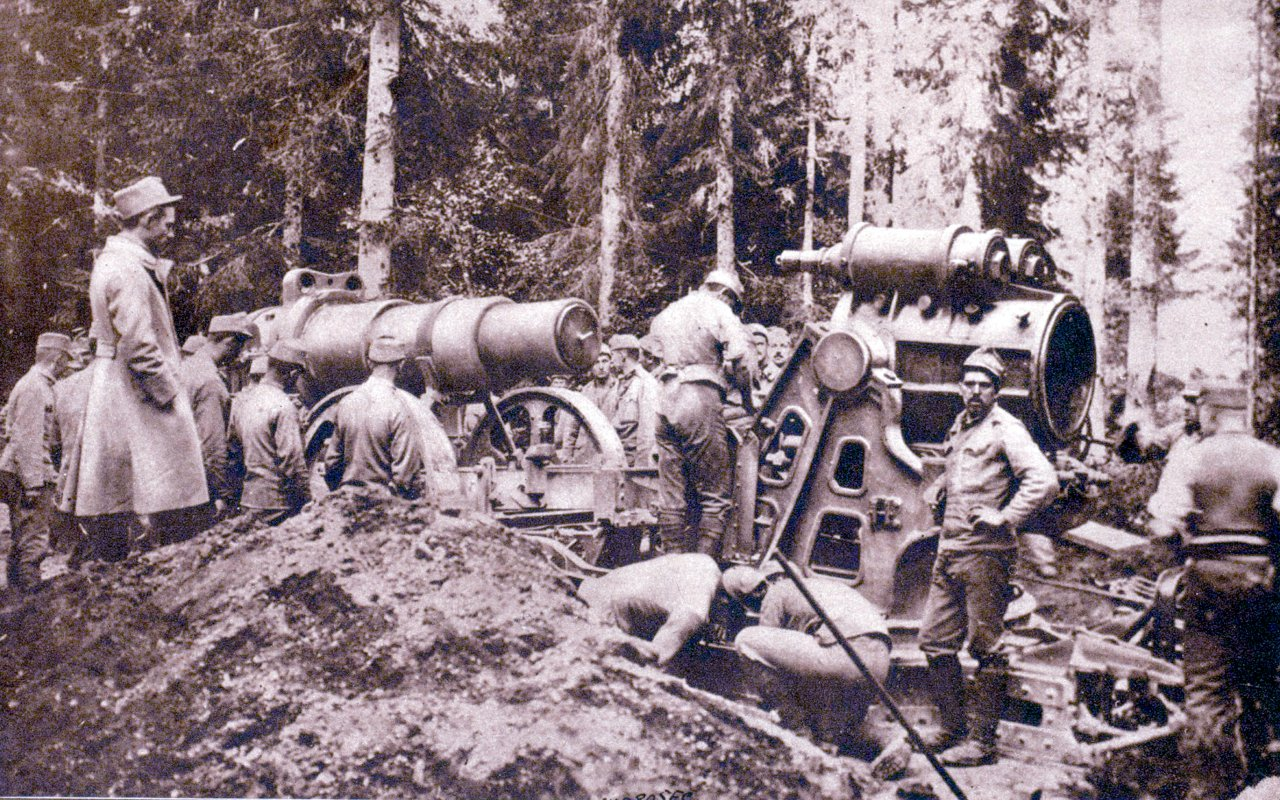
Soldiers with a Škoda 305 mm siege howitzer in the Carpathian Mountains, 1915

Bulgaria joined the Central Powers in October 1915 and invaded Serbia and Macedonia, and by mid-1916 it had pushed the Serbs out of Macedonia into Albania. Romania declared war on Austria-Hungary in August 1916 and entered Transylvania, but German and Austrian forces drove it back over the Carpathians, and together with the Bulgarians they took Bucharest in December 1916. In Russia the war cut off supplies and markets and brought inflation and shortages of food and fuel, and by 1916 strikes were spreading and soldiers were growing insubordinate. After the Bolsheviks seized power, Russia left the war under the Treaty of Brest-Litovsk of 3 March 1918, giving up its Polish and Baltic territories, Ukraine and Finland. The treaty was annulled after Germany's defeat in November 1918.

Bulgaria signed an armistice on 29 September 1918 after its defeat at Dobro Pole. Czech and Slovak soldiers who had defected on the Russian front formed the Czechoslovak Legion, and in 1916 Masaryk, Beneš and Štefánik set up a Czechoslovak National Council, which the Allies recognized in 1918 as the basis of a future government. Czechoslovakia proclaimed its independence on 28 October 1918, Hungary left the Habsburg monarchy on 1 November, and Emperor Charles gave up power on 11 November. In November 1918 Poland, which had been absent from the map of Europe for 123 years, regained its independence under Piłsudski. During 1918 assemblies in Bessarabia, Bukovina and, at Alba Iulia, Transylvania voted for union with Romania.

=== Revolution and civil war (1917–1921) ===
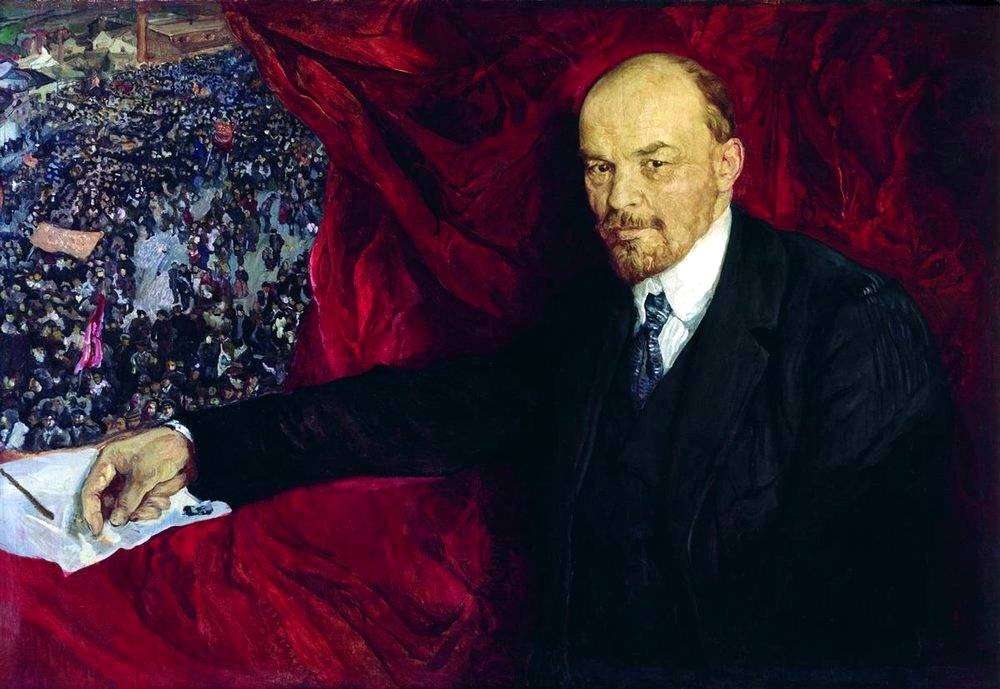
Lenin and a Demonstration by Isaak Brodsky, 1919

In February 1917 strikes and riots in Petrograd forced Nicholas II to abdicate, ending imperial rule in Russia, and a Provisional Government took power. In the October Revolution the Bolsheviks under Vladimir Lenin overthrew it on 7 November 1917, and in January 1918 they dissolved the newly elected Constituent Assembly, in which they held only about a quarter of the seats. The Russian Civil War broke out in 1918 between the Red Army and the anti-communist Whites, who were backed by British, French and American troops, and by the end of 1920 the communists had won. Soviet Russia recognized Finland's independence in December 1917 but could not retake Estonia, Latvia and Lithuania, which made peace with it in 1920 after their wars of independence. A Ukrainian republic concluded a separate peace with the Central Powers in February 1918, and in the Belarusian lands a Belarusian National Republic was proclaimed in March 1918. The Bolsheviks then set up Soviet republics by force in Belarus in January 1919 and in Ukraine in March 1919. Poland fought the Polish–Soviet War over its eastern frontier and turned back the Red Army near Warsaw in 1920, and the Treaty of Riga of 1921 divided the Belarusian and Ukrainian lands between Poland and Soviet Russia. Soviet Belarus joined the newly founded Soviet Union in December 1922.

=== Interwar period (1919–1939) ===
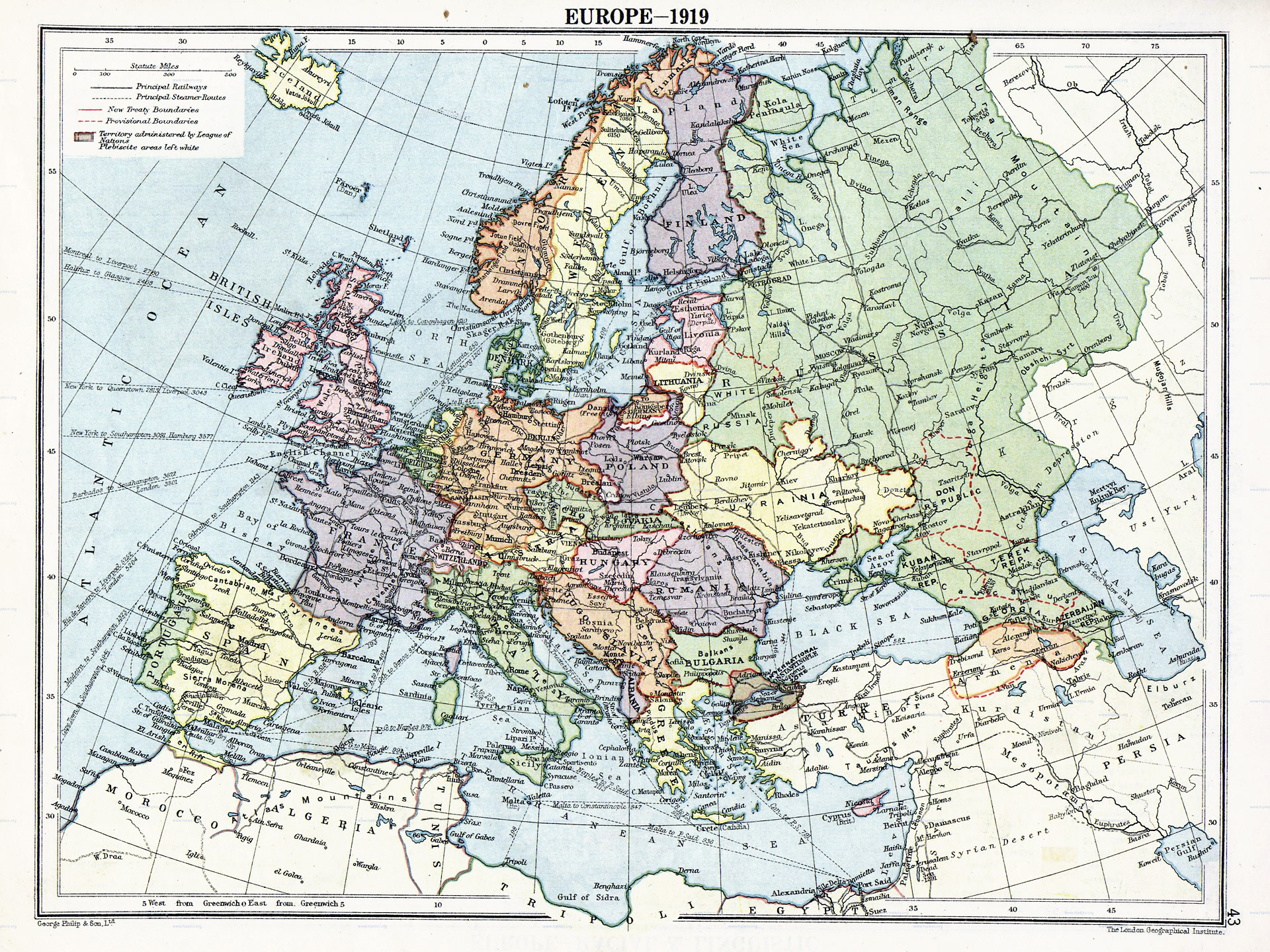
Europe in 1919

Europe in late 1938, after the Anschluss and the Munich Agreement

World War I ended with the breakup of the Russian, Austro-Hungarian and Ottoman empires and territorial losses for Germany, and a series of new or restored states emerged in Eastern Europe, among them Poland, Czechoslovakia, Yugoslavia, Estonia, Latvia and Lithuania. Austria and Hungary were left with much-reduced borders. The new states had sizeable ethnic minorities, which were to be protected under a minority regime of the League of Nations. Ethnic Germans were by far the largest minority in Eastern Europe, and in some areas, as in the Sudetenland, parts of Poland and parts of Slovenia, German speakers formed the local majority, which led to conflicts over self-determination.

Hungary lost more than two-thirds of its territory and about 60 percent of its population under the Treaty of Trianon in 1920 and was ruled by the regent Miklós Horthy until 1944. Romania's claims to Transylvania, Bessarabia and northern Bukovina were upheld at the Paris peace conference, creating Greater Romania, while Bulgaria lost its Aegean coast under the Treaty of Neuilly in 1919. In Poland, where minorities made up a third of the population, Piłsudski returned to power in the May Coup of 1926. In the Polish-ruled western Belarusian lands most Belarusian schools were closed in 1924, and opponents of the government were held in the camp at Bereza Kartuska. In Soviet Belarus the Belarusian language and culture flourished in the 1920s, but forced collectivization began in 1928, and in the 1930s Stalin's government reshaped the language toward Russian and carried out mass political persecution.

Most of the new states began as parliamentary democracies, but authoritarian regimes took power in Poland and Lithuania in 1926, in Estonia, Latvia and Bulgaria in 1934 and in Romania in 1938. Czechoslovakia remained a democracy until the Munich Agreement of September 1938, concluded without its participation. In March 1939 Slovakia declared independence and German troops occupied Bohemia and Moravia. Unable to form stable alliances, the states of the region were too weak to stand up to Nazi Germany or the Soviet Union, which took them over between 1938 and 1945.

=== World War II ===
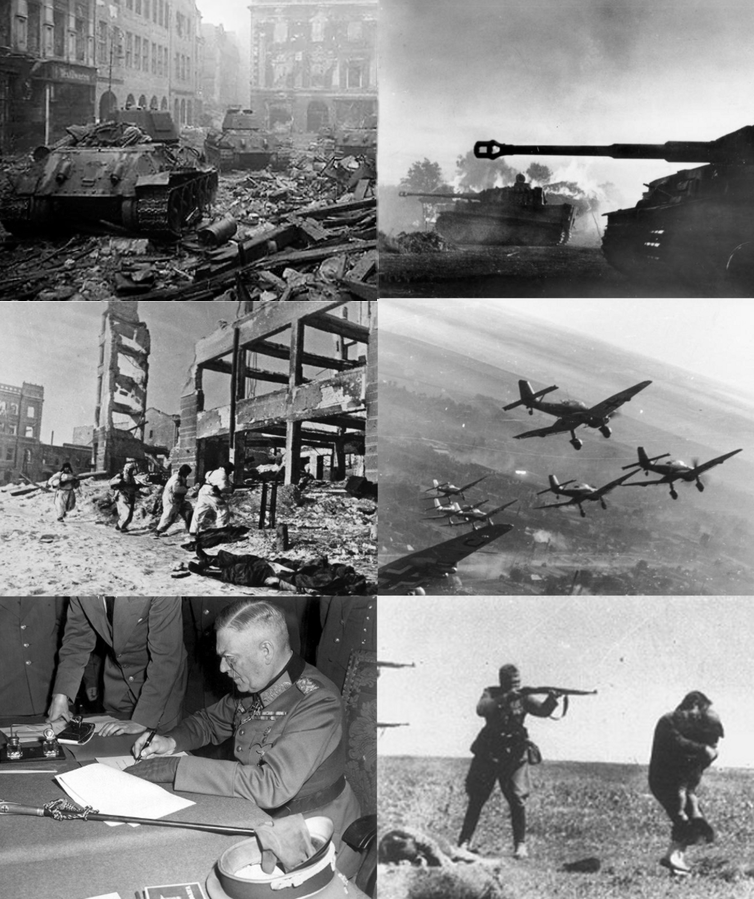
Scenes from the Eastern Front, 1941–1945

In the Molotov–Ribbentrop Pact of 23 August 1939 Germany and the Soviet Union divided Eastern Europe into spheres of influence. Germany invaded Poland on 1 September 1939 and the Soviet Union invaded it from the east on 17 September. The Soviet Union deported more than a million people from the areas it occupied to labour camps, and in 1940 its secret police murdered thousands of Polish officers, whose bodies were found at Katyn in 1943. Germany invaded the Soviet Union on 22 June 1941 with what was in effect the largest invasion force in history, and Russian, Belarusian and Ukrainian territory became the scene of fierce fighting. About six million people in Poland, more than 15 percent of its population, died during the war, Belarus lost more than two million people under German occupation, and Soviet losses are estimated at 20 million soldiers and civilians.

Germany, Italy, Hungary and Bulgaria invaded Yugoslavia on 6 April 1941 and partitioned it after its surrender eleven days later. The Ustaša, a fascist Croatian separatist movement led by Ante Pavelić, proclaimed the Independent State of Croatia, which included Bosnia and Herzegovina, with German and Italian backing. The Ustaša regime murdered between 320,000 and 340,000 Serbs in Croatia and Bosnia, and more than 30,000 Croatian Jews were killed. At Jasenovac, its largest camp, it murdered between 77,000 and 99,000 people, among them Serbs, Jews, Roma and political opponents. By late summer 1941 an uprising in Serbia and Bosnia begun by the communist-led Partisans and the Serb nationalist Chetniks of Draža Mihailović had inflicted serious losses on the Germans, and Hitler ordered 100 hostages to be shot for every German killed. The Partisans of Josip Broz Tito fought as an offensive force of their own rather than as mere auxiliaries of the Allies, and their pressure drove the Chetniks into tactical alliances with the Axis. After the Partisans survived the Axis offensives of 1943 on the Neretva and the Sutjeska, the Western Allies recognized Tito as the leader of the Yugoslav resistance. In October 1944 the Soviet army, aided by the Partisans, liberated Serbia, and by May 1945 communist control extended over the whole of Yugoslavia.

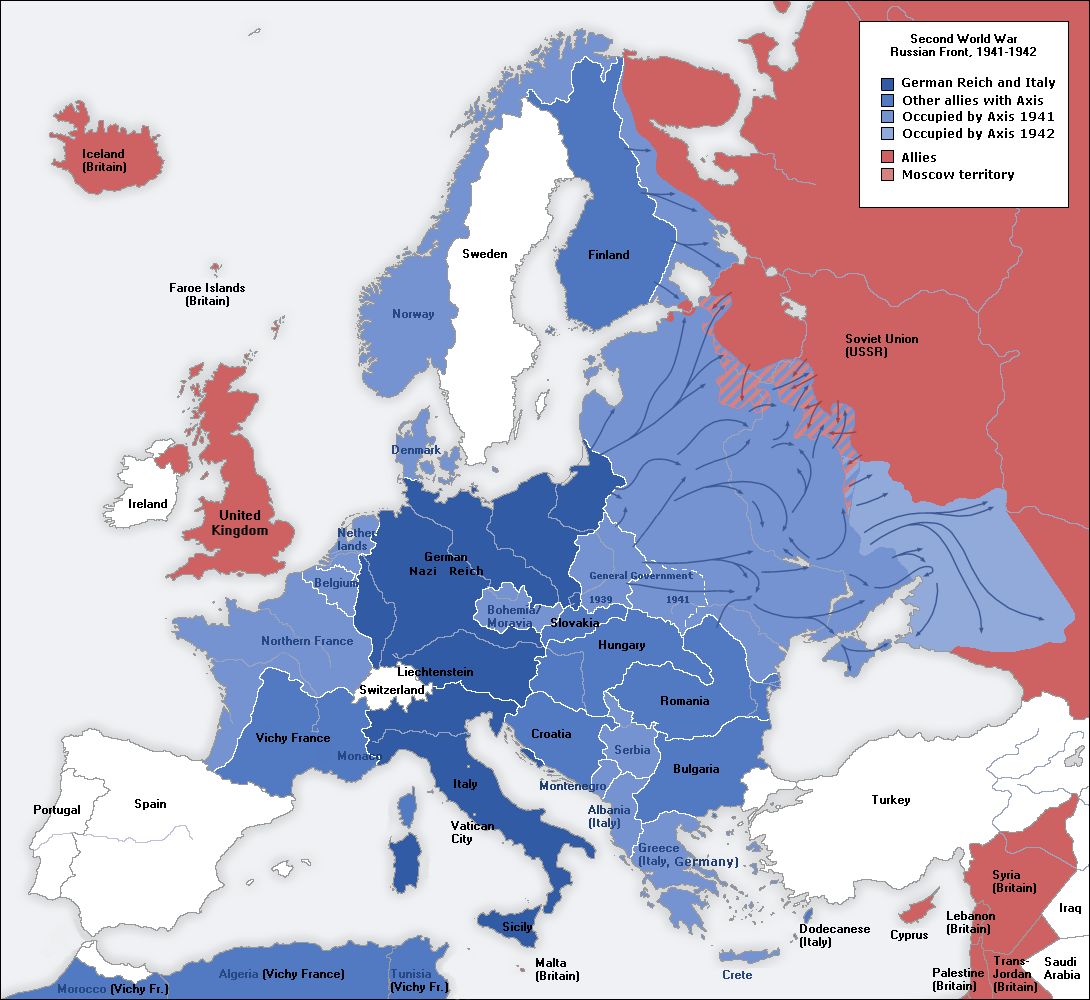
The war in Europe, 1941–1942

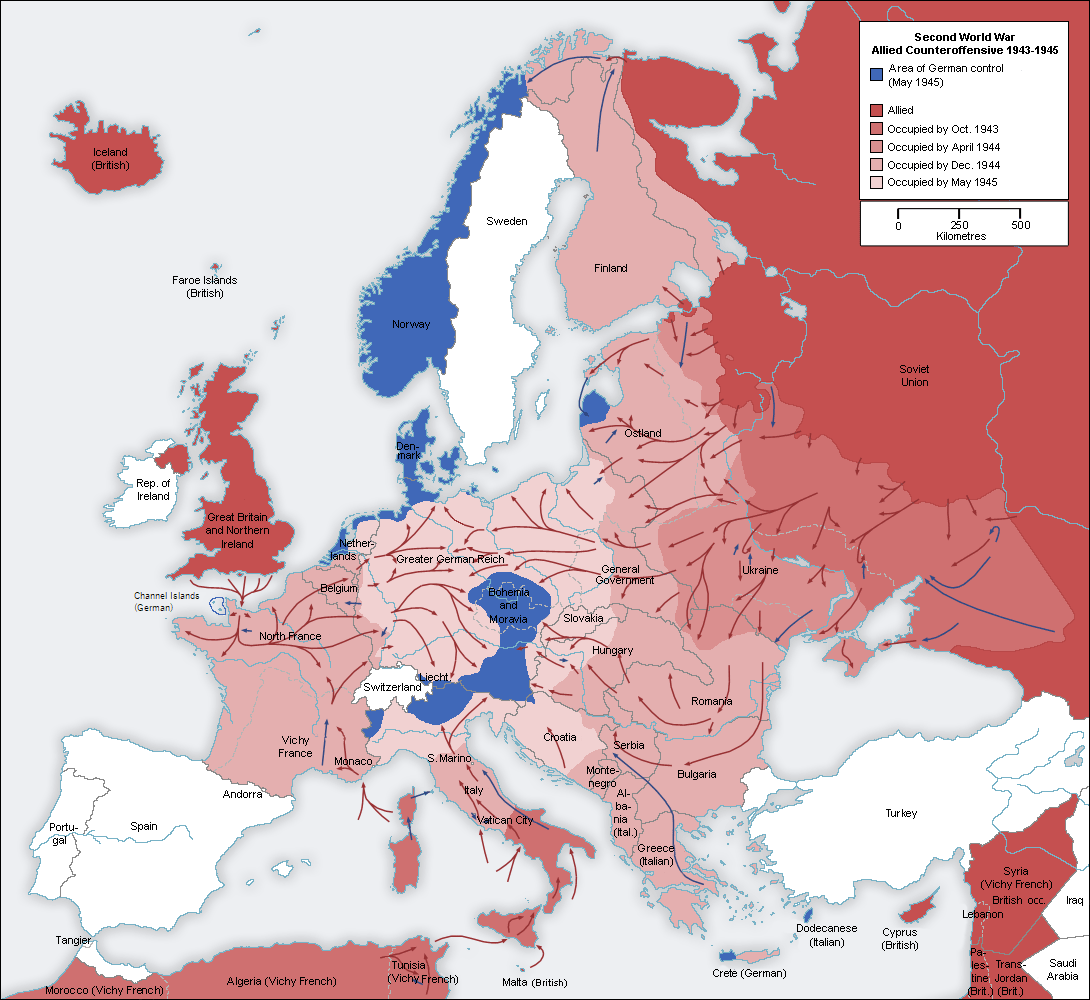
The war in Europe, 1943–1945

In February 1943 the Red Army forced the surrender of the German army at Stalingrad. By the end of 1943 it had broken the siege of Leningrad, by the end of 1944 it had driven the Germans back beyond the 1939 Soviet border into Eastern Europe, and in May 1945 it took Berlin. When Soviet forces approached Warsaw in 1944, the Polish Home Army rose against the Germans in the Warsaw Uprising, but the Soviets halted short of the city, and the Germans crushed the uprising and destroyed about 90 percent of Warsaw. The Red Army entered Romania in 1944 and Bulgaria in September 1944. The future of Eastern Europe was decided by the power of the Soviet army. Finland stayed independent but was obliged to remain neutral in the Cold War.

==== The Holocaust ====
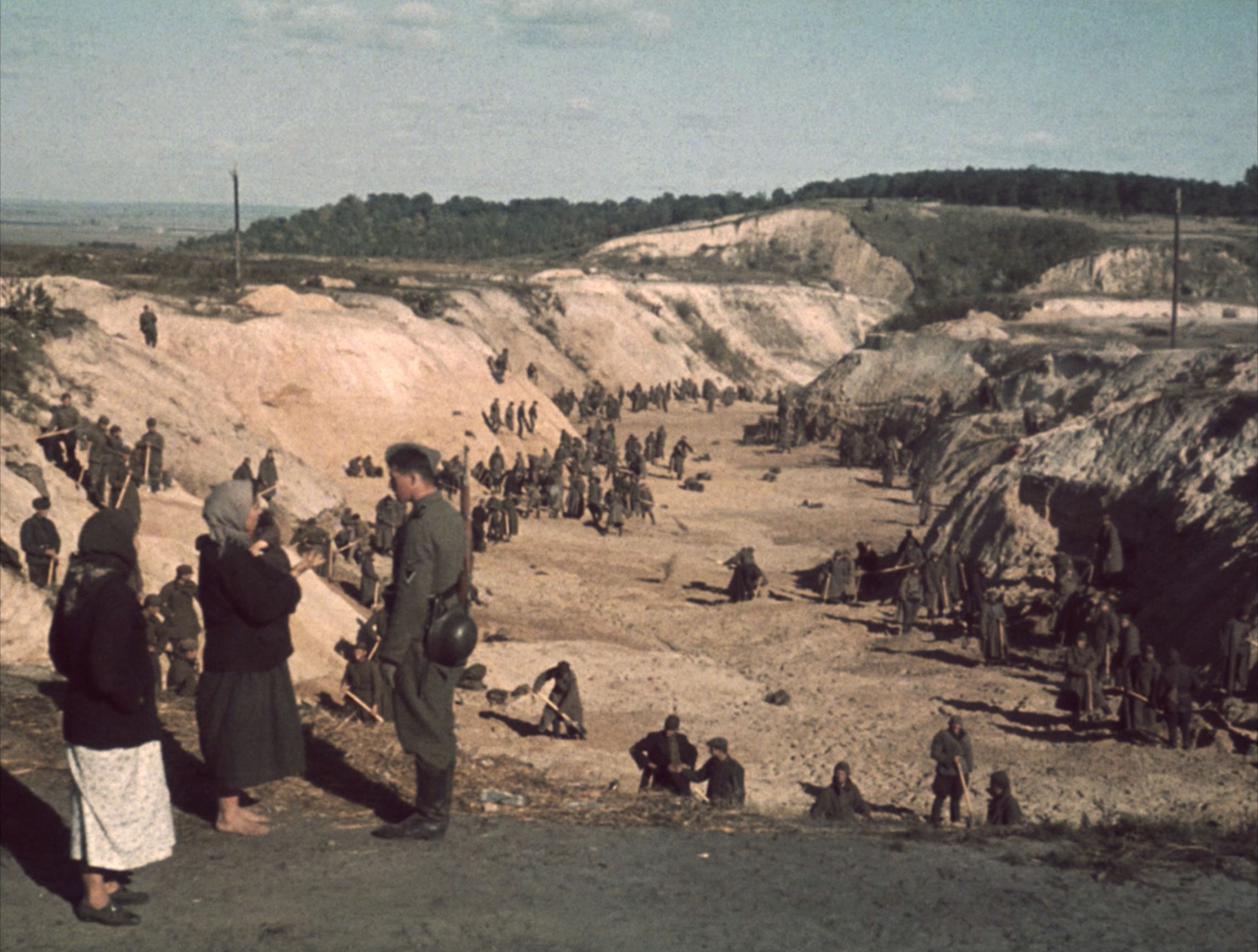
Soviet prisoners covering a mass grave at Babi Yar, Kyiv, 1941

The Holocaust, (Note: /ˈhɒləkɔːst/ HOL-ə-kawst)) known in Hebrew as the Shoah, (Note: /ˈʃoʊə/ SHOH-ə; Hebrew: שׁוֹאָה, romanized: Shoah, IPA: [ʃoˈʔa], lit. 'Catastrophe') was the genocide of European Jews during World War II. From 1941 to 1945, Nazi Germany and its collaborators systematically murdered around six million Jews across German-occupied Europe, approximately two-thirds of Europe's Jewish population. The murders were committed primarily through mass shootings across Eastern Europe and poison gas chambers in extermination camps, chiefly Auschwitz-Birkenau, Treblinka, Belzec, Sobibor, Chełmno and Majdanek death camps in occupied Poland. Concurrent Nazi persecutions killed millions of other non-Jewish civilians and prisoners of war (POWs); the term Holocaust is sometimes used to include the murder and persecution of non-Jewish groups, such as the Romani and Soviet POWs.

==== Generalplan Ost ====
The Generalplan Ost (German pronunciation: [ɡenəˈʁaːlˌplaːn ˈɔst]; lit. 'Master Plan for the East'), abbreviated GPO, was Nazi Germany's plan for the settlement and "Germanization" of captured territory in Eastern Europe, involving the genocide, extermination and large-scale ethnic cleansing of Slavs, Eastern European Jews, and other indigenous peoples of Eastern Europe categorized as "Untermenschen" in Nazi ideology. The campaign was a precursor to Nazi Germany's planned colonisation of Central and Eastern Europe by Germanic settlers, and it was carried out through systematic massacres, mass starvations, chattel labour, mass rapes, child abductions, and sexual slavery.

==== Reprisals and expulsions ====
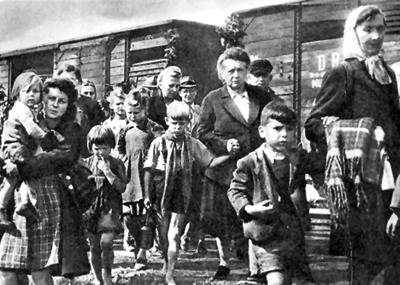
Expulsion of Germans from the Sudetenland

As the Red Army advanced into eastern Germany in 1945, its soldiers attacked German civilians in many places. Women and girls suffered especially, and historians' estimates of the number raped by Red Army soldiers range from 500,000 to two million. One estimate puts the figure at about 1.9 million, about 1.4 million of them in the former eastern territories of Germany and during the flight and expulsion of the German population. At the Potsdam Conference in the summer of 1945 the Allies moved Poland's western border to the Oder and Neisse rivers, which meant moving millions of Germans to Germany. Almost all of the roughly 9.5 million Germans of East Prussia, Pomerania, Silesia and neighbouring areas were expelled westward, and throughout Eastern Europe German-speaking populations were expelled to the reduced borders of Germany or to Austria in one of the largest ethnic cleansing operations in history. Regions where Germans had formed the majority were resettled with Polish or Czech speakers. As Yugoslavia's frontiers were extended into Istria and parts of the Julian Alps in 1945, Partisan reprisals against fleeing Croat and Slovene collaborationists there were especially brutal.

=== Cold War (1945–1989) ===
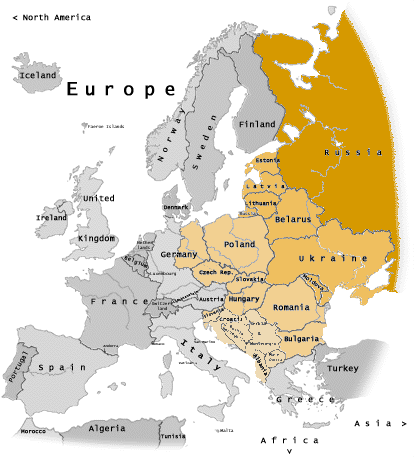
Pre-1989 division between the "West" (grey) and "Eastern Bloc" (orange) superimposed on current borders: Russia (the former RSFSR) Other countries formerly part of the USSR Members of the Warsaw Pact Other former Communist states not aligned with Moscow

At the Yalta Conference in February 1945 Stalin pledged to allow free elections in Poland and the other countries occupied by the Soviet Union, but the communists, backed by the Soviets and holding key ministries, gradually took power. Working with the Soviet secret police, the NKVD, local communists set up new secret police forces, which arrested political enemies from prepared lists, and they took over the interior ministries, which controlled the police. In a speech at Fulton, Missouri, on 5 March 1946, Winston Churchill said that "from Stettin in the Baltic to Trieste in the Adriatic, an iron curtain has descended across the Continent". Bulgaria abolished its monarchy in 1946 and Romania's king was forced to abdicate in 1947, the communists completed their takeover of Czechoslovakia in February 1948, and the Hungarian communists had full control by 1949. The German Democratic Republic was founded in the Soviet occupation zone in October 1949.

The new borders were followed by large population transfers. Besides the expulsion of the Germans, about three million Poles were moved from the former Polish territory awarded to the Soviet Union and resettled in the former German lands. Almost half a million Ukrainians in Poland were resettled in the Ukrainian SSR, and in 1947, in Operation Vistula, about 150,000 more were deported from south-eastern Poland to the former German territories. Czechoslovakia and Hungary agreed to an exchange of populations, under which about 160,000 Hungarians had been moved by 1948.

The Soviet Union itself included Belarus, Ukraine, the Moldavian republic and Estonia, Latvia and Lithuania, which it had occupied and annexed in 1940. Under Soviet pressure Czechoslovakia withdrew from talks on the Marshall Plan in 1947. The Soviet bloc was bound together by the Cominform from 1947, the Council for Mutual Economic Assistance (Comecon) from 1949, and the Warsaw Pact military alliance from 1955.

Yugoslavia broke with Moscow in 1948 and in 1961 hosted the first meeting of the non-aligned states in Belgrade. Albania sided with China in the Sino-Soviet split, withdrew from the Warsaw Pact after the invasion of Czechoslovakia in 1968, and lost China's aid in 1978. Romania refused to subordinate its industrialization to Comecon plans and denounced the 1968 invasion.

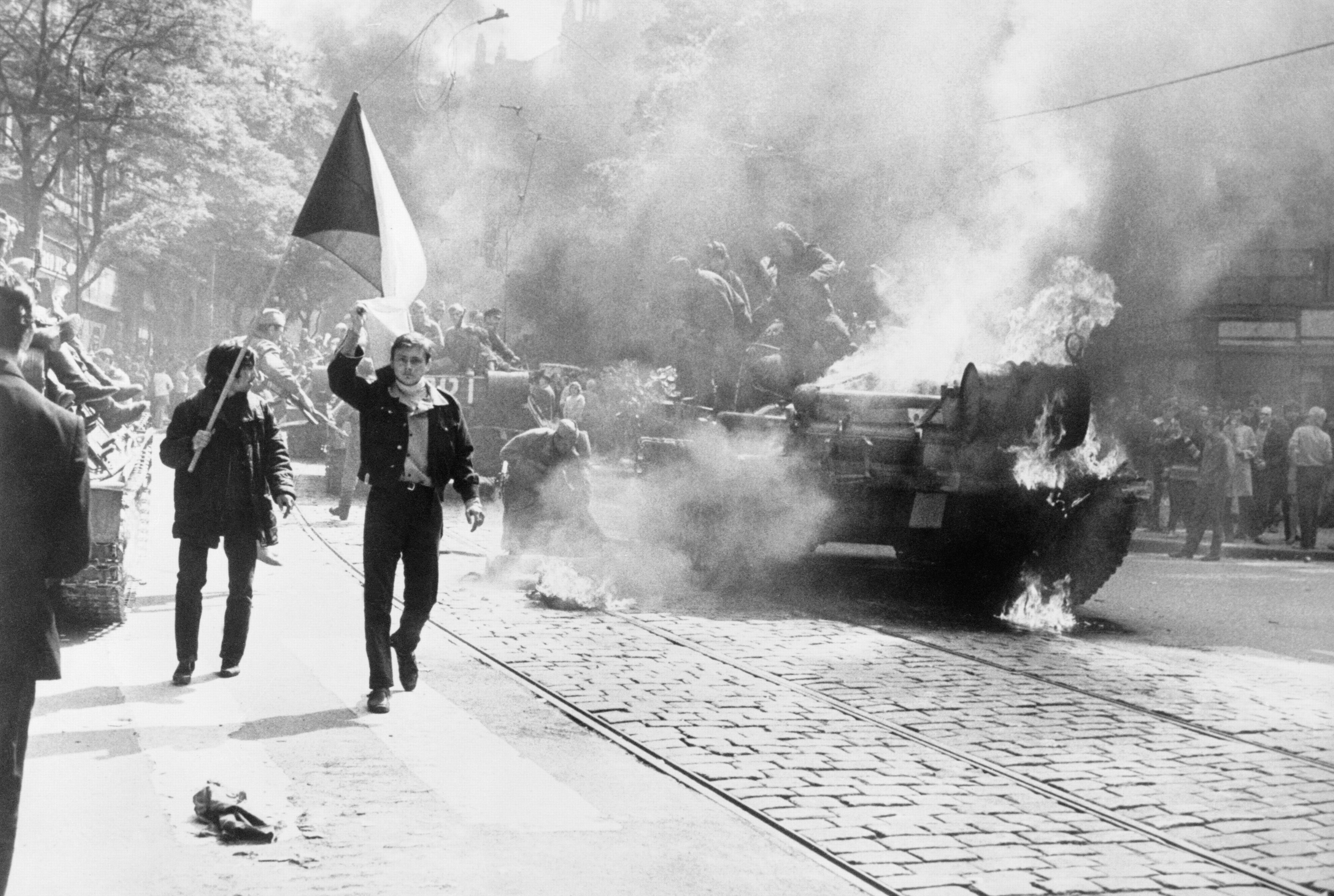
Czechoslovaks carry their flag past a burning tank in Prague, August 1968

Opposition to communist rule broke out repeatedly. Soviet troops and East German police put down a workers' uprising in East Germany in June 1953, and in 1961 East Germany built the Berlin Wall after nearly 3.5 million people had left for the West. After riots in Poznań in June 1956, the Polish party chose Władysław Gomułka as its leader despite Soviet threats to invade. The Hungarian Revolution that October was crushed by Soviet tanks, and about 200,000 Hungarians fled to the West. The Prague Spring reforms of Alexander Dubček were ended by the Warsaw Pact invasion of August 1968. In Poland the strikes of August 1980 gave rise to Solidarity, an independent trade union with about 10 million members, which Wojciech Jaruzelski suppressed under martial law in December 1981.

=== Fall of communism (1989–1991) ===
Under Mikhail Gorbachev the Soviet Union loosened its control over Eastern Europe, and in 1989 and 1990 it accepted the collapse of communist rule across the region. In Poland the round table talks of early 1989 legalized Solidarity, and in the June 1989 election the communists lost nearly all the contested seats. In August the Catholic intellectual Tadeusz Mazowiecki became prime minister of a cabinet dominated by Solidarity.

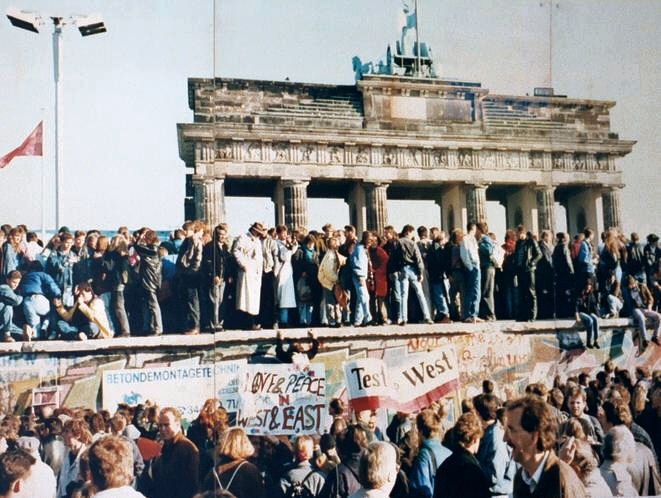
West and East Germans at the Brandenburg Gate after the opening of the Berlin Wall, 1989

In Hungary hundreds of East Germans crossed into Austria at the Pan-European Picnic on 19 August 1989, and within three weeks the government had opened the western border and let tens of thousands more cross. A new constitution of 23 October 1989 made Hungary a republic with a multiparty system. In East Germany 70,000 protesters marched in Leipzig on 9 October, and after the crowds there passed 100,000, Erich Honecker resigned on 18 October. On 9 November border police opened the Berlin Wall, and on 3 October 1990 the German Democratic Republic joined the Federal Republic in German reunification.

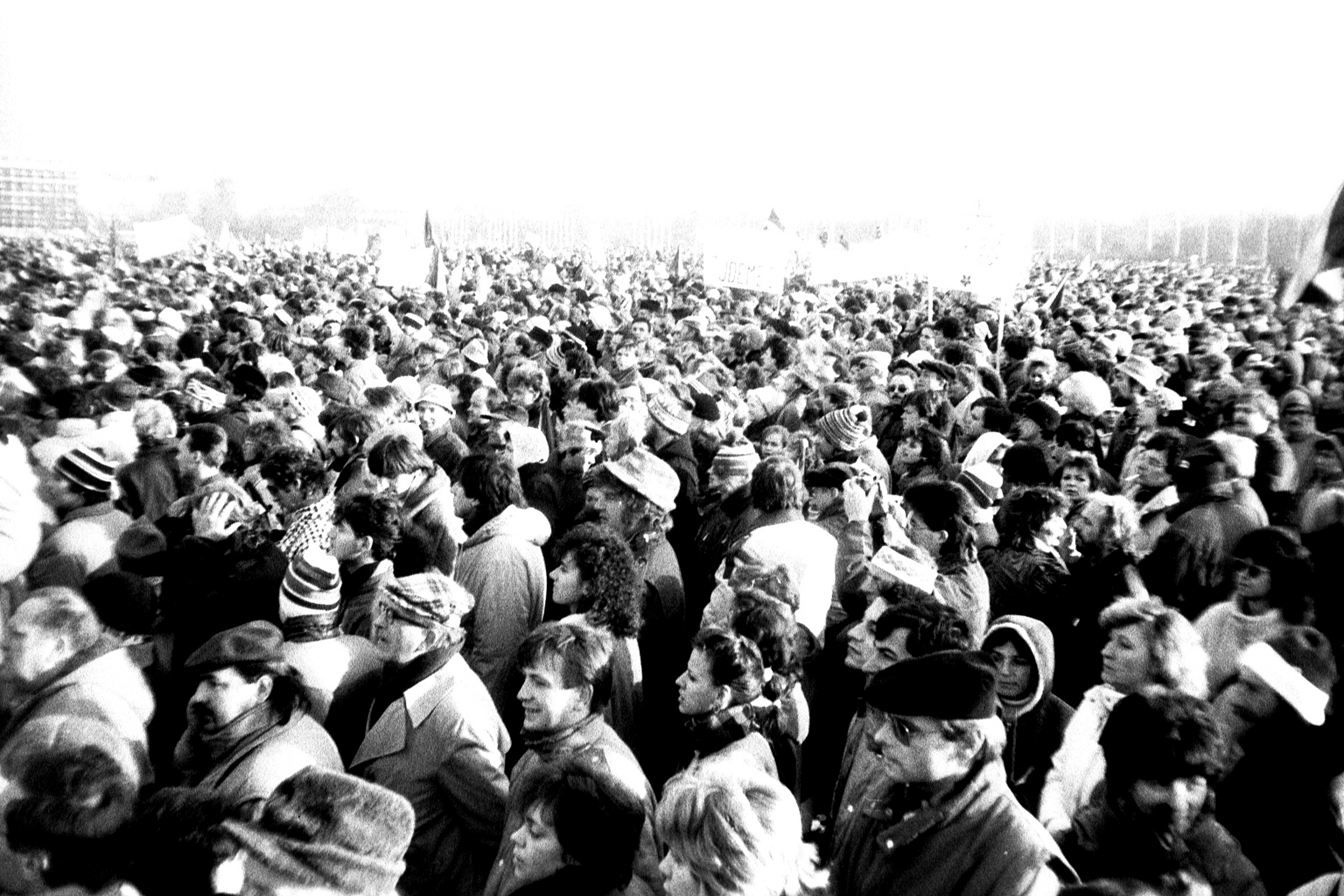
A crowd at Letná, Prague, 25 November 1989

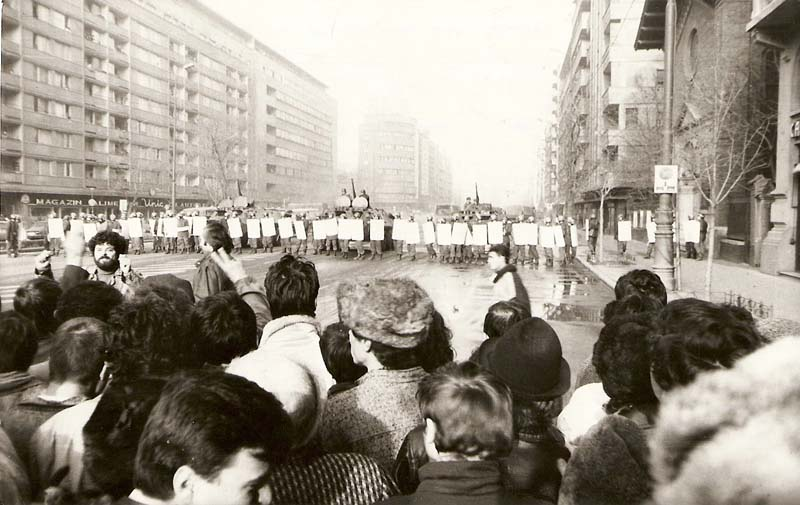
Tanks in Bucharest during the Romanian revolution

The Velvet Revolution of November and December 1989 ended more than 40 years of communist rule in Czechoslovakia, and on 29 December the dissident playwright Václav Havel was elected interim president. In Bulgaria the party leadership removed Todor Zhivkov, and the first free election since the war followed in June 1990. In Romania the regime of Nicolae Ceaușescu collapsed after his security forces fired on demonstrators in Timișoara on 17 December, and he was tried and executed on 25 December. Albania held its first multiparty elections since the 1920s in 1991.

In the Soviet Union about 2 million Baltic residents formed the Baltic Way, a 600-kilometre human chain from Tallinn to Vilnius, on 23 August 1989. Lithuania voted for independence in March 1990. The Warsaw Pact was dissolved on 1 July 1991, and after the failed coup attempt in Moscow in August, Estonia, Latvia, Ukraine, Belarus and Moldova declared independence. The Soviet Union ceased to exist on 25 December 1991.

=== Breakup of Yugoslavia ===
The breakup of Yugoslavia from 1989 to 1999

Croatia declared independence on 25 June 1991. The Yugoslav People's Army withdrew from newly independent Slovenia and turned against Croatia, and in the war that followed Vukovar was levelled and about a third of Croatia was occupied before UN-sponsored troops were stationed in the disputed areas. When Bosnia and Herzegovina's independence was recognized in April 1992, Bosnian Serb forces began firing on Sarajevo. The Bosnian War killed about 100,000 people and displaced more than 2 million, and in July 1995 Bosnian Serb forces killed more than 7,000 Bosniak men in the Srebrenica massacre. Croatian offensives in May and August 1995 regained western Slavonia and central Croatia from rebel Serbs, and the Dayton Agreement ended the Bosnian War in December 1995.

In the Kosovo conflict of 1998–1999 ethnic Albanians fought Serbian and Yugoslav forces until an 11-week NATO bombing campaign ended the conflict. Yugoslavia became the federation of Serbia and Montenegro in 2003, which dissolved in 2006, and in February 2008 Kosovo declared independence, which the United States and several leading EU members recognized but Serbia did not. A 2010 advisory opinion of the International Court of Justice found that the declaration did not violate international law, and a 2013 agreement gave the Serbs of northern Kosovo a degree of autonomy in exchange for de facto recognition of Kosovo's authority there.

In Macedonia a 2001 armed conflict with an ethnic Albanian armed group ended with the Ohrid Framework Agreement, in which the government promised to make Albanian an official language, and under the 2018 Prespa Agreement with Greece the country took the name North Macedonia.

=== Post-communist transition ===
Deputy Prime Minister Leszek Balcerowicz (second from left) in Wałbrzych, March 1991

Czechoslovakia separated peacefully into the Czech Republic and Slovakia on 1 January 1993, in what became known as the Velvet Divorce. Across the region the move to market economies brought high social costs in the early years. In Poland the Balcerowicz Plan, a "shock strategy" introduced on 1 January 1990, freed almost all prices, abolished most subsidies and held wage rises below price increases. Industrial production fell by 24 percent in 1990 and real personal incomes by 22 percent, and unemployment reached 11.4 percent by the end of 1991, before the economy stabilized in 1992 and began to grow.

In the first three years of transition GDP fell by about 13 percent in Poland and Czechoslovakia, 25 percent in Bulgaria and Romania, 30–40 percent in the Baltic states, Russia and Ukraine and 50 percent in Moldova, and hyperinflation hit many countries. Industrial production in eastern Germany fell to less than half its previous level after unification, and in Albania many people lost their savings when pyramid investment schemes collapsed in 1997. In Russia, where price controls were lifted in January 1992, GDP fell by roughly half between 1990 and 1995 by official figures, although Western analysts estimated a much smaller decline, and male life expectancy dropped from 63.5 years in 1991 to 57.3 in 1994. An IMF review in 2014 found that countries which made faster, front-loaded reforms returned to growth sooner.

In Moldova fighting with separatists in Transnistria grew into a civil war by May 1992, in which weapons released by the Russian 14th Army were used against Moldovan units. More than 300 people had been killed by the end of the summer.

=== Russian constitutional crisis (1993) ===
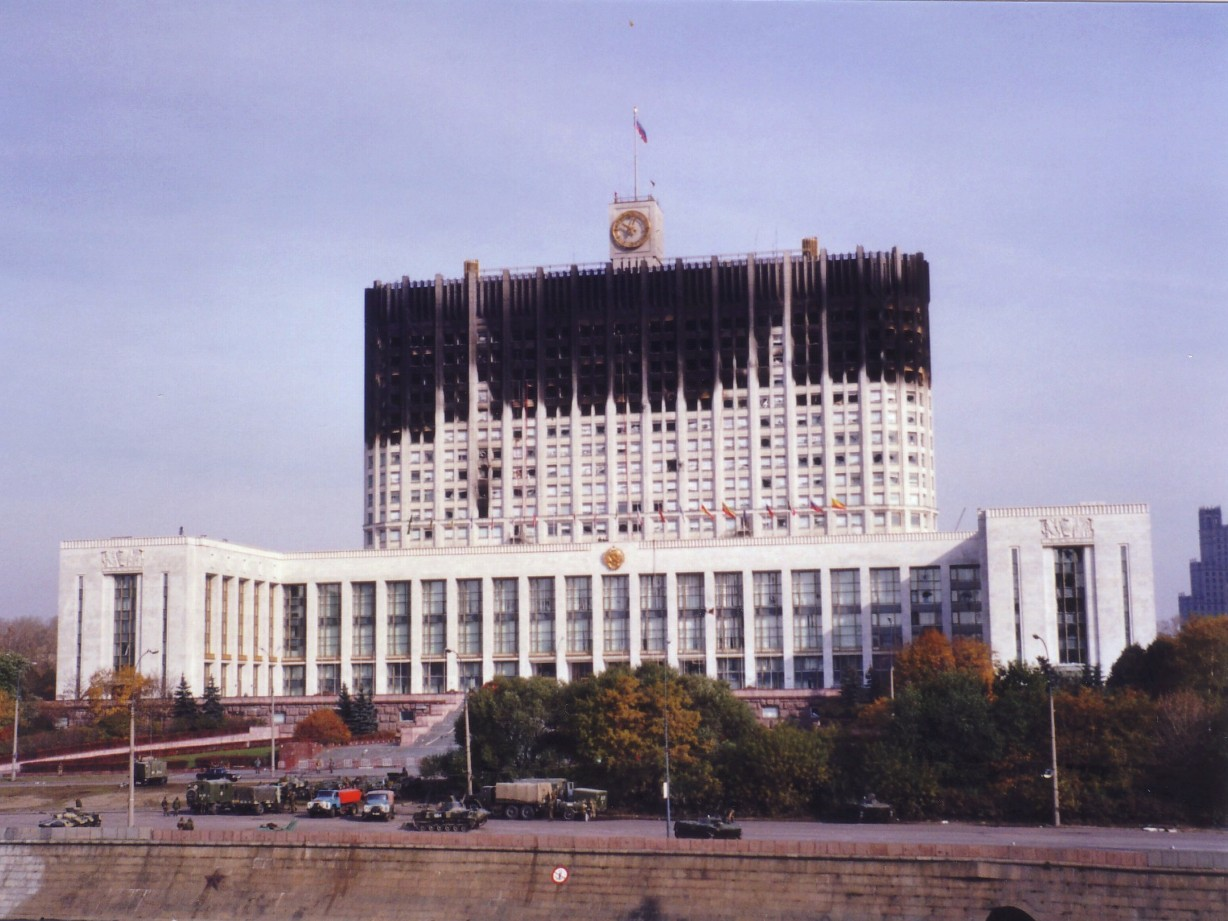
The White House in Moscow burning after tank fire, 4 October 1993

Personal clashes between Yeltsin and the parliamentary leadership under Ruslan Khasbulatov, together with high inflation and economic crisis, led to a break between the executive and the legislature. In March 1993 the Congress of People's Deputies stripped Yeltsin of the decree-making powers he had been given after the 1991 coup attempt, but in a referendum on 25 April nearly three-fifths of voters expressed confidence in him.

On 21 September 1993 Yeltsin issued decrees dissolving the parliament. The parliament declared them illegal, impeached him and swore in Vice President Alexander Rutskoy as president, and weapons were handed out to civilians to defend its building, the White House. In early October armed clashes broke out in Moscow, the most serious around the Ostankino television centre, and on 4 October tanks fired on the White House. Everyone inside, including Rutskoy and Khasbulatov, surrendered and was arrested. A new constitution providing for a strong presidency was approved by referendum in December 1993.

=== Chechen wars ===
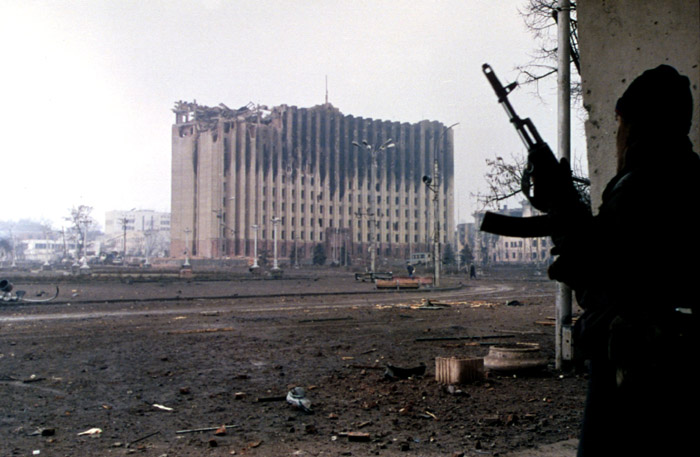
A Chechen fighter near the government palace in Grozny, January 1995

In late 1991 the former Soviet air force general Dzhokhar Dudayev took power in Chechnya and declared it independent of Russia. Russian troops invaded on 11 December 1994 and took the capital, Grozny, in March 1995, but guerrilla resistance continued until a provisional peace treaty in May 1997. Up to 100,000 people in Chechnya died and more than 400,000 fled their homes during the 1990s. Russian forces returned in late 1999 after Prime Minister Vladimir Putin blamed Chechen separatists for bombings that had killed scores of civilians in Russia, although their involvement was never proved. Yeltsin resigned on 31 December 1999 and named Putin acting president. In the second war Russian forces drove the fighters into the mountains, and in 2002 Chechen militants took nearly 700 people hostage in a Moscow theatre, where some 130 hostages died, mostly from a gas released by the security forces. Russia declared its counterinsurgency operations over in April 2009.

=== Russo-Georgian War (2008) ===
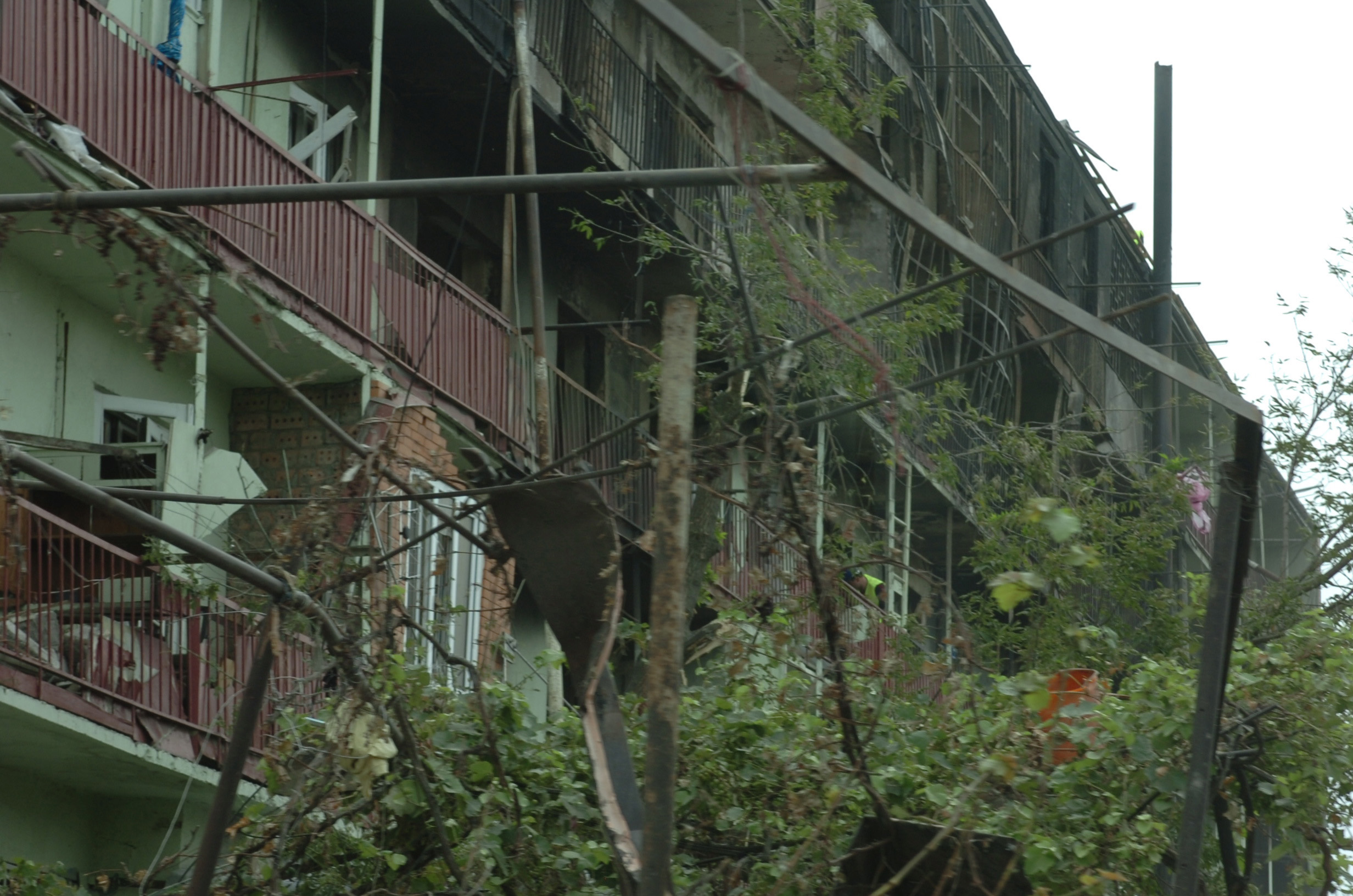
A burnt apartment building in Gori, August 2008

After independence separatist movements arose in Georgia's regions of South Ossetia and Abkhazia. Abkhazia declared independence in 1992, which the international community refused to recognize, and after a ceasefire in 1994 CIS peacekeepers were deployed there. Mikheil Saakashvili, elected president in 2004, made Georgia's territorial unity a priority, and in 2006 South Ossetia restated its wish for independence in an unofficial referendum. In August 2008 Georgian forces fought South Ossetian separatists and Russian forces that had crossed the border with the stated aim of defending Russian citizens and peacekeepers. Russian troops took Tskhinvali, the South Ossetian capital, and moved through Abkhazia before a French-brokered ceasefire. Russia then recognized the independence of Abkhazia and South Ossetia, which Georgia condemned and other countries criticized.

=== 21st century ===
2004–2013 EU enlargements

Existing members
New members in 2004
Cyprus
Czech Republic
Estonia
Hungary
Latvia
Lithuania
Malta
Poland
Slovakia
Slovenia

Existing members
New members in 2007
Bulgaria
Romania

Existing members
New members in 2013
Croatia

The Czech Republic, Estonia, Hungary, Latvia, Lithuania, Poland, Slovakia and Slovenia joined the European Union on 1 May 2004, Bulgaria and Romania followed on 1 January 2007 and Croatia on 1 July 2013, and these eleven members are sometimes called the EU11. The Czech Republic, Hungary and Poland had joined NATO in 1999, followed by Bulgaria, Estonia, Latvia, Lithuania, Romania, Slovakia and Slovenia in 2004, Albania and Croatia in 2009, Montenegro in 2017 and North Macedonia in 2020. Slovenia adopted the euro in 2007, followed by Slovakia in 2009, Estonia in 2011, Latvia in 2014, Lithuania in 2015, Croatia in 2023 and Bulgaria in 2026. All eleven eventually joined the Schengen Area, which abolished checks at the borders between its members, with Bulgaria and Romania the last to join on 1 January 2025. Moldova applied for EU membership in March 2022, was granted candidate status in June 2022 and formally opened accession negotiations in June 2024.

In the early and mid-2000s the region grew by an average of 6 percent a year, but in many countries growth came to depend on large-scale borrowing for consumption and construction. The global financial crisis hit the region harder than any other part of the world, and in 2009 output fell by an average of 6 percent and by as much as 18 percent. Belarus, Bosnia and Herzegovina, Hungary, Latvia, Romania and Ukraine received large rescue programmes supported by the IMF.

In Hungary Viktor Orbán, prime minister from 1998 to 2002 and again from 2010, declared in 2014 that he aimed to build a society that would be "illiberal" in nature. During the European migrant crisis his government built a barbed-wire fence along the border with Serbia, and he joined other Eastern European leaders in rejecting mandatory EU quotas for settling migrants. In September 2018 the European Parliament voted by 448 to 197 to begin proceedings against Hungary under Article 7 of the EU treaty, which could lead to sanctions, and his government called the move revenge for its opposition to immigration. In April 2026 Orbán conceded defeat to the Tisza Party of Péter Magyar.

In Poland EU officials accused the Law and Justice government of disregarding the rule of law after it refused in 2016 to accept a ruling of the constitutional court, and in July 2017 its bills on judicial reform brought mass protests. Law and Justice lost its majority in the October 2023 election, in which turnout was a record 74 percent, to Civic Platform and its allies.

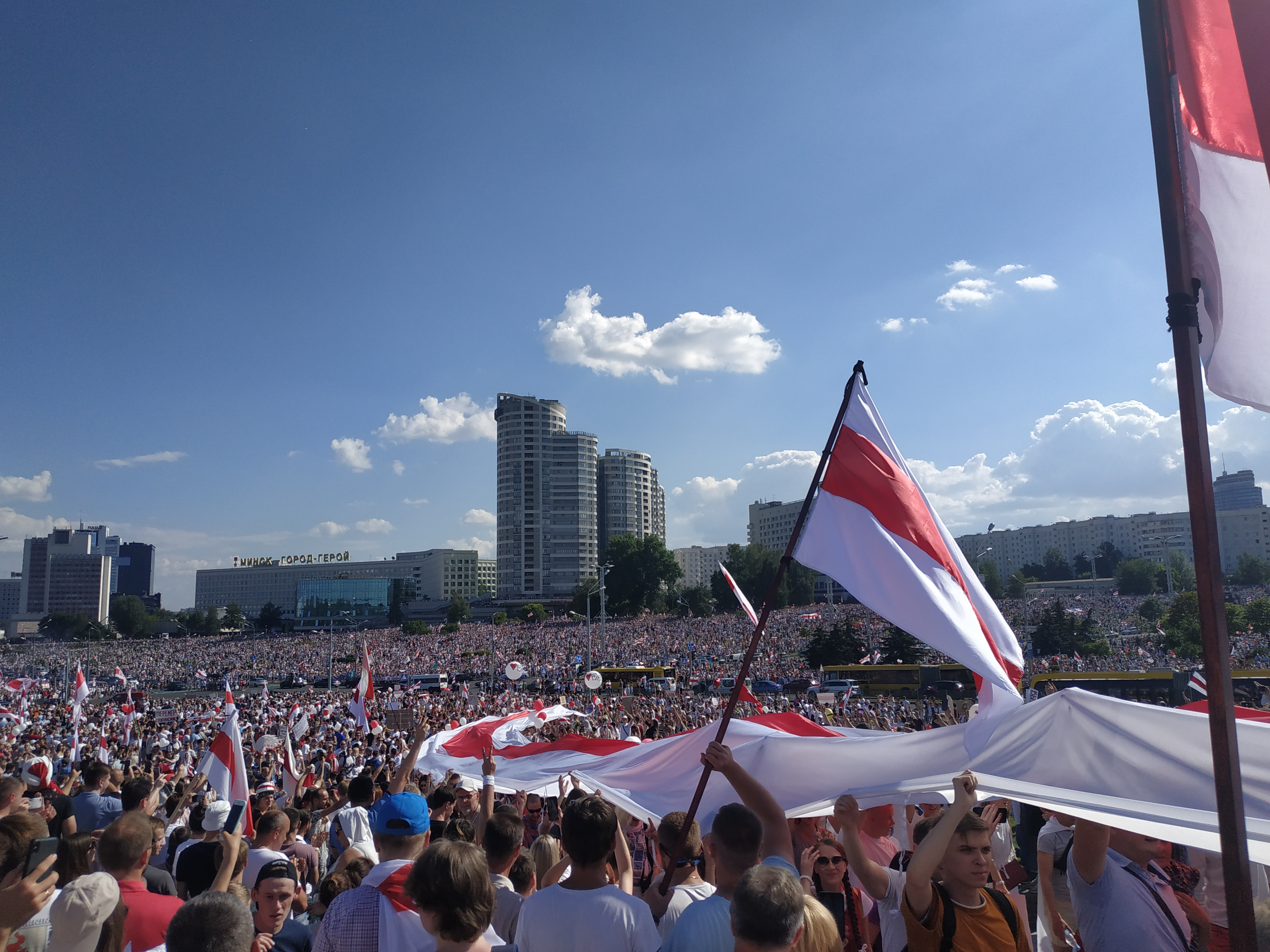
Protesters in Minsk, 16 August 2020

Crowds in Belgrade welcoming students who walked to the city for the protest of 15 March 2025

In Belarus Alexander Lukashenko's handling of the 2020 presidential election, which included the jailing of opposition candidates, set off the largest demonstrations in the country since the end of the Soviet Union. Nearly 7,000 people were arrested, workers at state-owned factories went on strike, and opposition leaders such as Sviatlana Tsikhanouskaya were forced into exile. In Serbia the collapse of a canopy at the Novi Sad railway station in November 2024, which killed 16 people, set off student-led protests across the country against government corruption. In the October 2026 parliamentary election the Student List, which grew out of the protests, defeated the governing coalition led by the Serbian Progressive Party, and Aleksandar Vučić, who had resigned as president to run for prime minister, conceded defeat.

== Geography ==
=== Physical geography ===
Peaks of the High Tatras in the Western Carpathians

The East European Plain, also called the Russian Plain, is a plain and series of broad river basins that covers nearly 4,000,000 square kilometres (1,500,000 sq mi) and averages about 170 metres (560 ft) in height. In Russia it extends about 1,600 kilometres (990 mi) eastward from the western border to the Ural Mountains and more than 2,400 kilometres (1,500 mi) from the Arctic Ocean to the Caucasus Mountains and the Caspian Sea. About half of this area lies below 200 metres (660 ft), and the highest point, in the Valdai Hills northwest of Moscow, reaches only 343 metres (1,125 ft). The plain continues northward into Finland, westward into the North European Plain and southward in the Romanian, Bulgarian and Hungarian plains. Europe's lowlands are most extensive between the Baltic and White seas in the north and the Black, Azov and Caspian seas in the south.

The Ural Mountains, the major part of the traditional boundary between Europe and Asia, extend some 2,500 kilometres (1,600 mi) from the bend of the Ural River to the Pay-Khoy Ridge. The range is worn down, and its highest point, Mount Narodnaya, reaches 1,895 metres (6,217 ft). The Carpathians, a geologically young chain that continues the Alps eastward, form an arc some 1,450 kilometres (900 mi) long from near Bratislava to the Iron Gate near Orșova in Romania. Inside the arc lies the Pannonian Basin, made up of the Little and Great Alföld of Hungary. The highest Carpathian peak, Gerlachovský štít, reaches 2,655 metres (8,711 ft). In the Balkan Peninsula the Balkan Mountains run east to west across Bulgaria, the Rhodope Mountains extend along the Greek–Bulgarian border and the Dinaric range follows the Adriatic coast to Albania.

=== Rivers and lakes ===
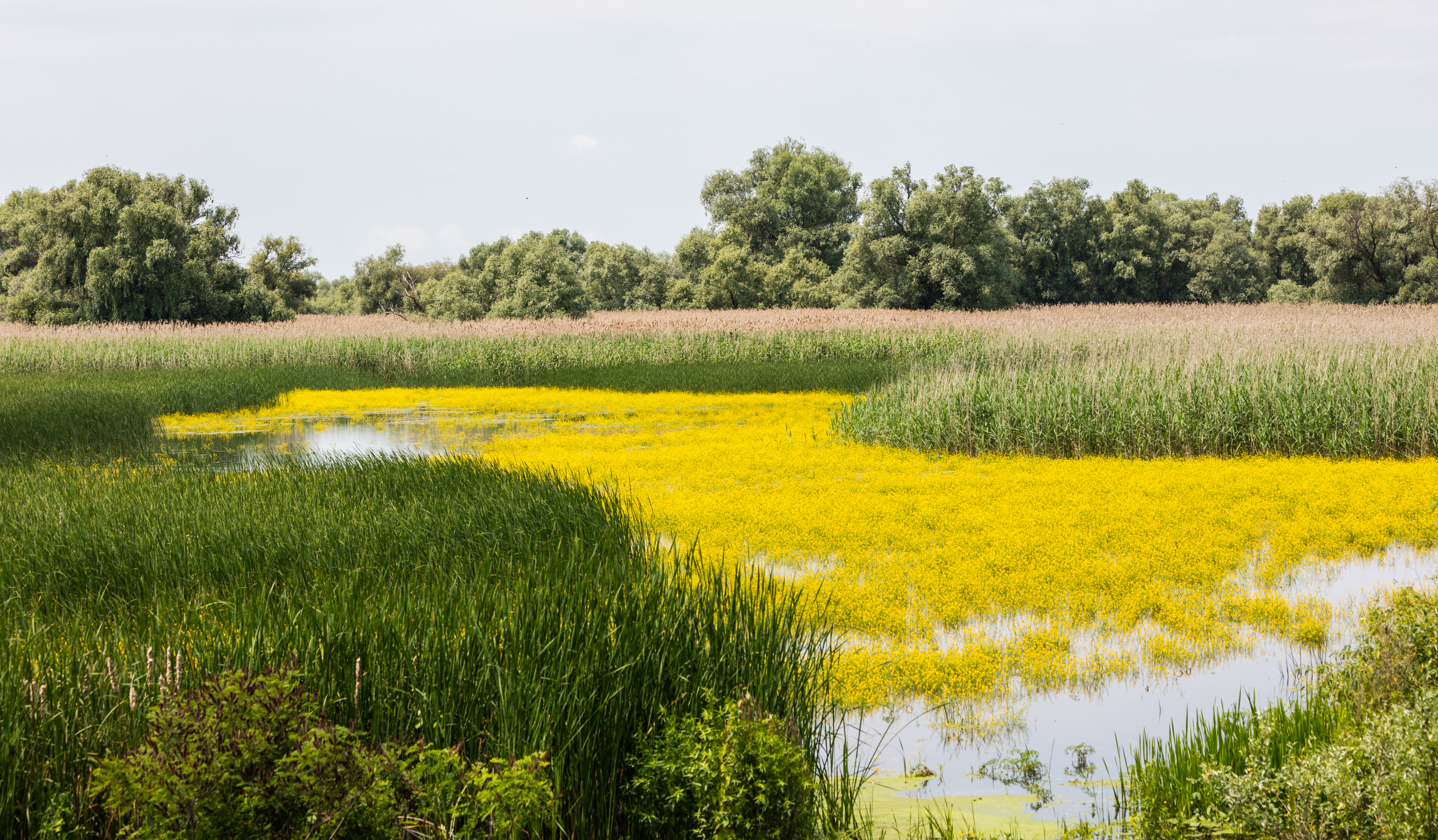
Reed beds and open water in the Danube Delta

The rivers of the East European Plain are long and flow slowly to five seas. The Volga, the longest river in Europe, rises in the Valdai Hills and flows 3,530 kilometres (2,190 mi) to the Caspian Sea, draining a basin of about 1,380,000 square kilometres (530,000 sq mi). The Dnieper, 2,200 kilometres (1,400 mi) long, flows south through western Russia, Belarus and Ukraine to the Black Sea. The Don flows 1,870 kilometres (1,160 mi) from the Central Russian Upland to the Gulf of Taganrog in the Sea of Azov, and the Volga–Don Canal links it with the Volga. The Danube, the second longest river in Europe after the Volga, rises in the Black Forest of western Germany and flows some 2,850 kilometres (1,770 mi) through ten countries to the Black Sea. Its delta covers some 4,300 square kilometres (1,700 sq mi).

The Vistula, the largest river of Poland and of the Baltic Sea drainage basin, flows 1,047 kilometres (651 mi) from the Western Beskids to a delta that enters the Baltic near Gdańsk. The Western Dvina, or Daugava, flows 1,020 kilometres (630 mi) through Russia and Belarus and across Latvia to the Gulf of Riga. The Neman, 937 kilometres (582 mi) long, rises near Minsk and flows through Belarus and Lithuania to the Curonian Lagoon. Lake Ladoga in northwestern Russia is the largest lake in Europe, with an area of 17,600 square kilometres (6,800 sq mi) excluding its islands. Lake Onega, the second largest, lies between Lake Ladoga and the White Sea and covers 9,720 square kilometres (3,750 sq mi). The region of the Baltic states is dotted with more than 7,000 lakes, and the Pripet Marshes of Belarus and Ukraine are the largest marshland in Europe.

=== Climate ===
Snow across southeastern Europe in a NASA satellite image, January 2018

In the central European type of climate, which covers much of central and southeastern Europe, the range between winter and summer temperatures increases eastward. Farther east the continental type covers northern Ukraine, eastern Belarus and Russia, as well as most of Finland and northern Sweden. Its winters are much colder and longer than in western Europe, with more snow, and are coldest in the northeast, while summers are hottest in the southeast. Most rain falls in summer, and in both the north and the southeast of the East European Plain annual precipitation is only 250 to 500 millimetres (9.8 to 19.7 in). In the Köppen climate classification the subarctic climate, dominated by a long, bitterly cold winter, extends in a broad swath from northern Scandinavia to Siberia.

In Warsaw the January average is about −3 °C (27 °F) and the July average about 19 °C (66 °F). Moscow averages −10 °C (14 °F) in January and about 18 °C (64 °F) in July, and Saint Petersburg has a January mean of −8 °C (18 °F). In European Russia the frost-free period varies with latitude from five months to three. The southern and coastal areas of the Balkans have a Mediterranean climate with hot, dry summers and mild, relatively rainy winters. In Croatia the Dalmatian coast, Istria and the islands have a mild Mediterranean climate, with average temperatures from about 5 °C (41 °F) in January to the low 20s °C in June, and most rain falls in winter.

=== Vegetation and wildlife ===
European bison in Białowieża Forest

Six main environmental belts sweep across the plains and plateaus of Russia, from Arctic desert and tundra in the north through taiga and mixed and deciduous forest to wooded steppe and steppe in the south. The tundra, a treeless and marshy plain, occupies only a narrow coastal belt in the extreme north of the East European Plain. The taiga occupies the Russian and West Siberian plains north of about 56–58° N. In its western part forests of spruce and fir grow in moister areas and pine on lighter soils, and the taiga is home to many elk, bears, muskrats and wolves.

The mixed and deciduous forest, with oak and spruce as its main trees, forms a triangular belt that is widest along Russia's western border and narrows towards the Urals, and much of it has been cleared for agriculture. The wooded steppe is transitional between the forest zone and the true steppe, which occupies a belt some 320 kilometres (200 mi) across from southern Ukraine through northern Kazakhstan to the Altai. The distinctive soil of the steppe is chernozem, or black earth, whose low acidity and high humus content give it a high natural fertility. Much of the steppe vegetation, particularly in the west, has been replaced by grain cultivation.

Białowieża Forest, a World Heritage Site on the border between Poland and Belarus, contains an immense range of primary forest. About 900 European bison live there, almost a quarter of the world's population. The Danube Delta, a World Heritage Site since 1991, is the largest and best preserved delta in Europe and hosts over 300 species of birds. It is also a biosphere reserve shared by Romania and Ukraine, which UNESCO describes as the largest wetland and reed bed in Europe. The World Heritage Site of ancient and primeval beech forests of the Carpathians and other regions of Europe, first inscribed in 2007, now has 93 component parts in 18 countries.

=== Environment ===
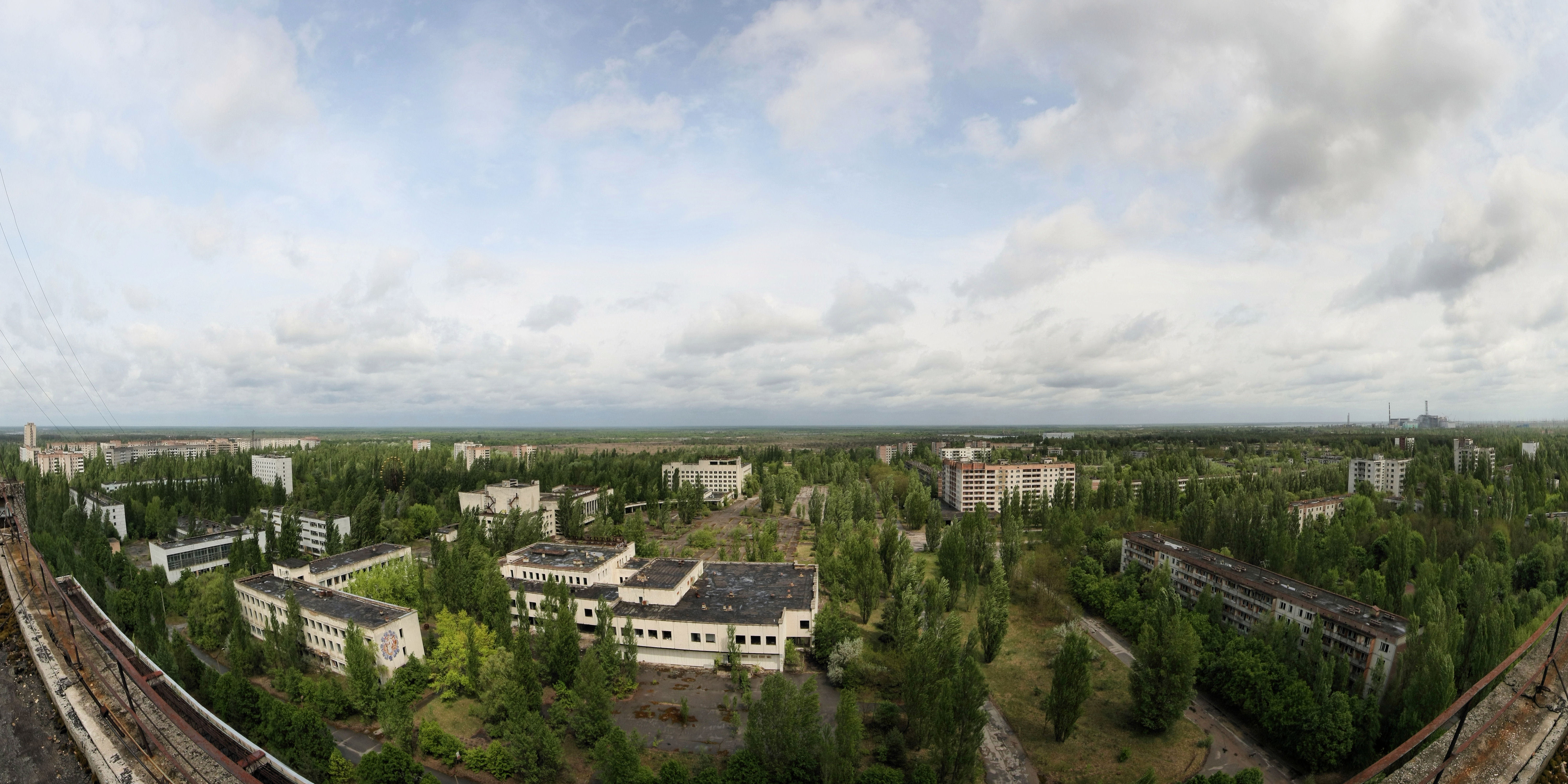
The abandoned town of Pripyat near the Chernobyl plant in 2009

Europe is the fastest-warming continent, according to the European State of the Climate report of the Copernicus Climate Change Service and the World Meteorological Organization. In 2024, Europe's warmest year on record, temperatures reached record highs in its central, eastern and southeastern regions, and the year brought a sharp contrast between extremely dry and often record-warm conditions in the east and warm but wet conditions in the west. Southeastern Europe had its longest recorded heat wave, and in September Storm Boris caused flooding, deaths and damage in Poland, Czechia, Slovakia, Hungary and Romania, as well as in Germany, Austria and Italy.

Rapid industrialization after the Second World War caused severe pollution in parts of the region. The border area of Czechoslovakia, East Germany and Poland became known as the "Black Triangle" because of its extreme air pollution. In the Jizera Mountains, acidification that began in the early 1950s and peaked in the mid-1980s killed 40 to 80 percent of the spruce stands, lowered the pH of surface waters and depleted life in streams and reservoirs, although some recovery has been observed since 1990. The Chernobyl disaster of April 1986 released between 50 and 185 million curies of radionuclides into the atmosphere and contaminated large areas of forest and farmland. The Soviet authorities created an exclusion zone with a radius of about 30 kilometres (19 mi) around the plant, which was later enlarged to 4,143 square kilometres (1,600 sq mi).

Coal remains important in parts of the region. In 2025 Poland and Czechia were the only producers of hard coal left in the EU, and Poland alone produced 97 percent of the total. Poland, Czechia, Bulgaria and Romania together accounted for about half of the EU's consumption of brown coal.

== Politics ==
=== Political systems ===
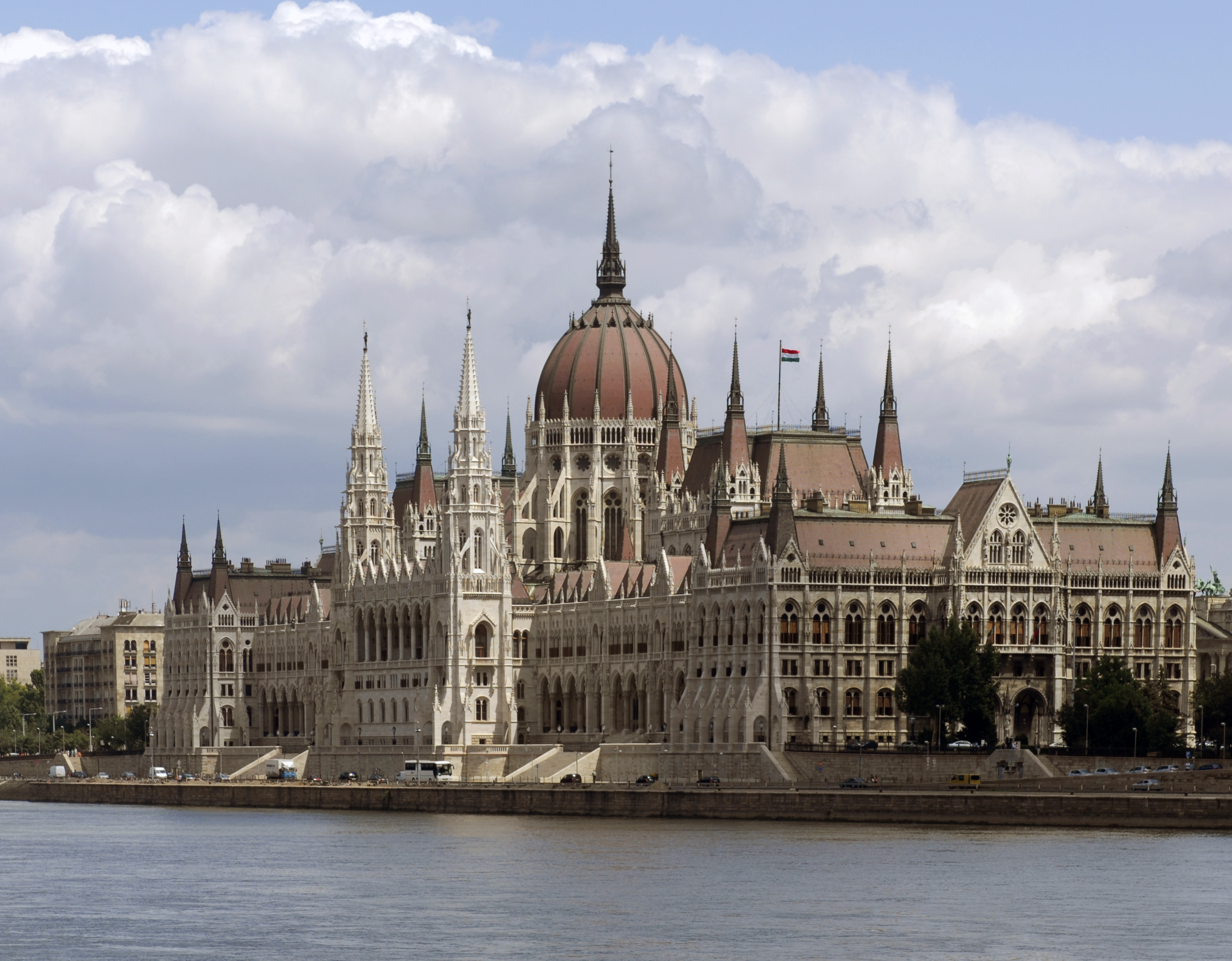
The Hungarian Parliament Building in Budapest

The European Union describes the Czech Republic, Hungary, Latvia and Poland as parliamentary republics with a prime minister as head of government and a president as head of state. The role of the president differs between them. In Hungary the president's main responsibilities are representative, while in Latvia the president has a largely ceremonial role and nominates the prime minister, whose government remains subject to the approval of parliament. Slovenia is a parliamentary democratic republic with a directly elected president, and its prime minister and ministers are elected by parliament. Romania, by contrast, is a semi-presidential republic in which both the president and the government hold executive functions.

Russia and Belarus give their presidents wide powers. Under the constitution that Russian voters approved in December 1993, the president is elected nationally and appoints the prime minister, subject to the approval of the State Duma, as well as cabinet members and senior judges, and can issue decrees with the force of law when parliament does not pass the president's proposals. The Federal Assembly consists of the State Duma, a lower house of 450 elected members, and the Federation Council, whose members are appointed to represent each of the country's administrative divisions. An amendment that took effect with the 2012 election lengthened the presidential term from four to six years, and changes made in 2020 ended the limit of two consecutive terms.

In Belarus a constitution of 1994 provided for a separation of powers, but after a referendum in November 1996, whose legitimacy many Belarusians and much of the international community questioned, it was revised to give the president far wider authority. Alexander Lukashenko, president since 1994, could now extend his term and govern by decree, while the bicameral National Assembly lost much of its power, and international observers described the parliamentary elections that followed as irregular or undemocratic. In Ukraine legislative power lies with the unicameral Verkhovna Rada. The president, directly elected for a five-year term, is head of state and commander-in-chief and can veto laws, although parliament can override a veto. The constitution of 1996 considerably strengthened the presidency, and the balance of power between the president and the prime minister was later altered by constitutional reforms.

Moldova, by contrast, is a parliamentary republic. Its constitution of 1994 established a unicameral parliament whose members are directly elected to four-year terms. A revision of the constitution in 2000 provided for the president to be elected by parliament, but in March 2016 the Constitutional Court ruled that revision unconstitutional, and the presidential election held that October was the first direct presidential election since 1996. The president serves as head of state and has limited functions, including in foreign policy and national defence, while executive power is exercised by the government.

In Bosnia and Herzegovina the Dayton Agreement of 1995 established a state made up of two highly autonomous entities, Republika Srpska and the Federation of Bosnia and Herzegovina, each with its own legislature and president. Its central institutions include a directly elected three-member presidency, which rotates every eight months between one Bosniak, one Serb and one Croat member. The presidency acts as head of state and appoints a multiethnic Council of Ministers, whose chairman serves as head of government after approval by the national House of Representatives.

The Palace of the Parliament in Bucharest, seat of the Romanian parliament

Freedom House published its Nations in Transit reports, which tracked democratic progress and setbacks in 29 countries from Central Europe to Central Asia, from 1996 until the termination of the project's funding forced it to halt production. Each country received a democracy score on a scale of 1 to 7, with 7 the highest level of democracy, and was assigned to one of five regime types, ranging from consolidated democracies to consolidated authoritarian regimes. In the 2024 edition, which covered the events of 2023, the Czech Republic, Estonia, Latvia, Lithuania, Slovakia and Slovenia were classified as consolidated democracies. Bulgaria, Croatia, Poland and Romania were classified as semi-consolidated democracies, which Freedom House defined as electoral democracies that meet relatively high standards for the selection of national leaders but show weaknesses in their defence of political rights and civil liberties.

Countries classified as transitional or hybrid regimes, which are typically electoral democracies with fragile democratic institutions, included Albania, Bosnia and Herzegovina, Hungary, Kosovo, Moldova, Montenegro, North Macedonia and Serbia. Among the consolidated authoritarian regimes were Belarus and Russia. Freedom House stated in 2020 that Hungary had experienced the largest drop ever recorded in Nations in Transit and that it had left the group of democracies in that year's edition, and the 2024 edition reported what it called a historic decline in Serbia during 2023.

=== International organizations ===
The Berlaymont building in Brussels, headquarters of the European Commission

Eleven states of the region are members of the EU. Eight of them joined in 2004, followed by Bulgaria and Romania in 2007 and Croatia in 2013. States that apply for membership must meet the Copenhagen criteria, defined by the European Council in 1993, which include stable institutions guaranteeing democracy, the rule of law, human rights and respect for and protection of minorities. Candidate countries in the region include Albania, Bosnia and Herzegovina, Georgia, Moldova, Montenegro, North Macedonia and Serbia, while Kosovo, which has applied but has not been granted candidate status, is a potential candidate. The Czech Republic, Hungary and Poland became the first former members of the Warsaw Pact to join NATO, in 1999. Seven more states of the region joined in 2004, Albania and Croatia in 2009, Montenegro in 2017 and North Macedonia in 2020.

The Visegrád Group dates from 15 February 1991, when the presidents of Poland and Czechoslovakia, Lech Wałęsa and Václav Havel, and the Hungarian prime minister József Antall signed a joint declaration in the Hungarian town of Visegrád. The founders aimed to deepen cooperation in building democratic institutions and market economies and, in the longer term, to take part in European integration. The group is an informal format of cooperation between the Czech Republic, Hungary, Poland and Slovakia, and its only fully institutionalized body is the International Visegrad Fund in Bratislava. The Three Seas Initiative, launched by Poland and Croatia in 2015, is an informal platform of 13 EU member states between the Adriatic, Baltic and Black seas, made up of the eleven EU members of the region together with Austria and Greece. It aims to develop transport, energy and digital infrastructure along a north–south axis, and its first summit was held in Dubrovnik in 2016.

Belarus and Moldova were among the former Soviet republics that formed the Commonwealth of Independent States (CIS) with Russia in 1991, while Estonia, Latvia and Lithuania declined to join. The CIS formally came into being on 21 December 1991 with Minsk as its administrative centre, and its functions include coordinating its members' policies on the economy, foreign relations and defence. In 1999 Belarus and Russia signed a treaty to found a Union State, intended as a politically integrated confederation with a common currency, but the exact form of the partnership remained unclear for many years afterwards. Russia, Belarus and Kazakhstan launched a customs union in 2010, and in January 2015 the three states and Armenia launched the Eurasian Economic Union, which Kyrgyzstan joined in August of that year. Modelled in part on the EU, it aims to create an internal market with free movement of goods, services, persons and capital.

== Economy ==
=== Economic history ===
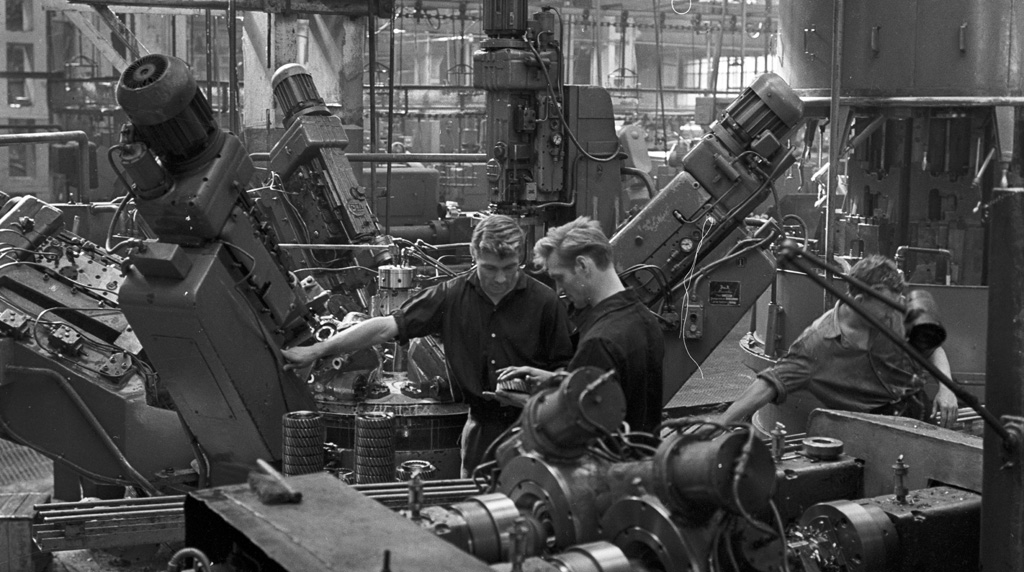
Workers at the Likhachev car plant in Moscow in 1963

Before World War II Poland had a free-market economy based largely on agriculture, with a few important centres of manufacturing and mining, agriculture and forestry produced more than half of Romania's national income, and Bulgaria's economy was agrarian, with a relatively undeveloped industrial base. After the communist takeovers the economies were reorganized on the Soviet model. Industry was nationalized and farming collectivized, and central planning gave the highest priority to industries such as machinery, metallurgy and chemicals, imposed forced saving and moved large numbers of workers from the countryside into industrial jobs in new urban centres. Poland abandoned collectivization in 1956, and about three-quarters of its farmland remained privately owned. Because governments set the prices of most goods, trade among the members of Comecon was conducted mainly by barter under bilateral agreements between governments.

Within the Soviet Union, the Russian republic's size and natural resources gave it a leading role. In the first Soviet decades these resources allowed mining, metallurgy and heavy engineering to grow rapidly, the railways to expand and energy supply to rise steeply, and from the 1960s the output of oil, gas, electricity and chemicals grew further. Ukraine received about 16 percent of Soviet investment funds in the 1980s but produced 17 percent of the Union's industrial output and 21 percent of its agricultural output. In effect, a fifth of Ukraine's national income was transferred to finance development in other republics, notably Russia and Kazakhstan. Belarus, whose agriculture and industry had been almost wiped out in the Second World War, was rebuilt with a large industrial sector that relied on other Soviet republics, above all Russia, for energy and raw materials. By the last years of the Soviet Union the economy of Russia, and of the country as a whole, was declining, and official statistics hid industrial inefficiency.

From the mid-1970s Poland's economy struggled with limited growth, held back by antiquated industry, subsidies that masked inefficient production and wages that were artificially high relative to productivity, and in the late 1980s a swelling budget deficit and hyperinflation brought economic crisis. In Bulgaria the growth rate fell to 3.7 percent during the five-year plan of 1981–1985, its lowest post-war level. By 1981 Romania could not pay even the interest on a foreign debt of more than US$10 billion. Nicolae Ceaușescu then imposed an austerity programme to cut imports, with rationing of basic foods, petrol and electricity throughout the 1980s, and in April 1989 he announced that the debt had been repaid. By January 1991 the members of Comecon had begun to pay for their trade in convertible currencies, and under agreements made early that year the organization was renamed and each member was left free to seek its own trade outlets.

The break-up of the Soviet Union was followed by a deep contraction in its former republics. Russia set out to replace central planning with a market economy, and to speed up privatization it issued vouchers to its citizens for buying shares in state enterprises, though in practice many vouchers were sold for cash and gathered up by entrepreneurs, and much of heavy industry stayed in state hands. In the decade after 1991 the Russian economy shrank by more than two-fifths. The lifting of price controls set off rapid inflation and real incomes fell sharply, and the financial crisis of 1998 forced a steep devaluation of the rouble, in which many banks failed and millions of people lost their savings. Growth resumed in the early 21st century, helped by steady oil revenues and the cheaper currency. Ukraine went through extreme inflation in the early 1990s, when many people grew their own food or held several jobs, and reached a measure of stability by 1996.

=== Economy today ===
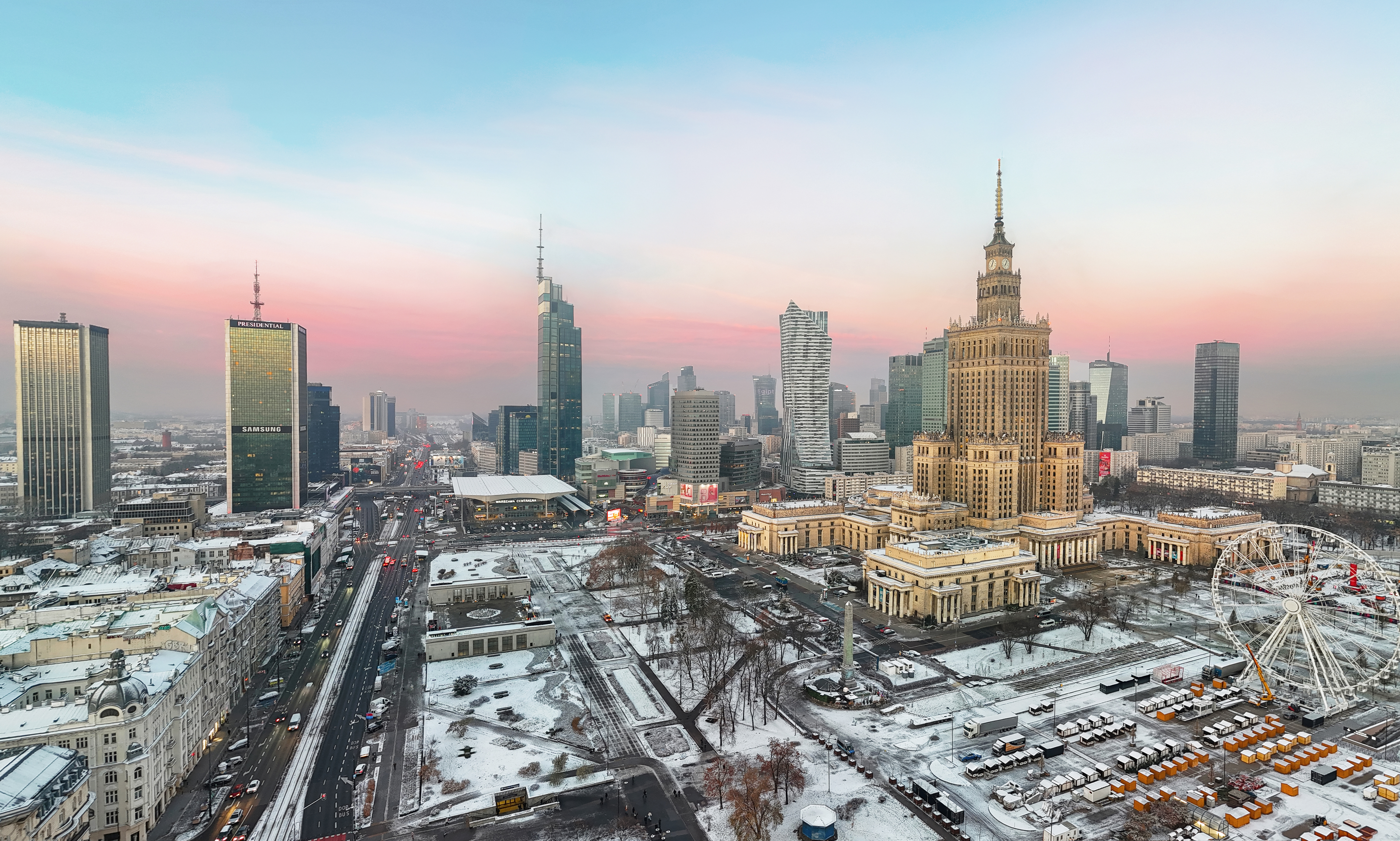
Central Warsaw, with the Palace of Culture and Science

Since 2004 output per person in several of the region's EU member states has moved closer to the EU average. Measured as GDP per capita in purchasing power standards, Romania rose from 35 percent of the EU average in 2004 to 78 percent in 2025, Poland from 52 to 81 percent, Lithuania from 50 to 87 percent and the Czech Republic from 81 to 92 percent. Slovakia rose from 58 percent in 2004 to 78 percent in 2015 but had fallen to 75 percent by 2025. Bulgaria remained at the lowest level in the EU from 2015 to 2025, although its figure rose steadily from 49 to 68 percent of the average, and in 2025 it shared the lowest level with Greece.

Seven of the region's eleven EU members have adopted the euro, from Slovenia in 2007 to Croatia in 2023 and Bulgaria, which became the 21st member of the euro area on 1 January 2026. The Czech Republic, Hungary, Poland and Romania keep their own currencies. The European Central Bank reviews their progress towards adopting the euro every two years, and its 2026 report found that none of their currencies took part in the exchange rate mechanism (ERM II) and that none of the countries had legislation fully compatible with the legal requirements for adopting the euro. Inflation was below the reference value in the Czech Republic but above it in Hungary, Poland and Romania, which were all subject to an excessive deficit procedure.

Outside the EU, GDP per capita in purchasing power standards in 2025 was 54 percent of the EU average in Montenegro, 52 percent in Serbia and 43 percent in Albania and North Macedonia. Moldova's largely agricultural economy had been built on state and collective farms under Soviet rule, and its transition to a free-market economy was difficult.

Belarus moved towards a market economy more slowly than other former Soviet republics, and only a small percentage of its state-run industry and agriculture was privatized in the years after independence. In the early 21st century Russia remained a major trading partner, although disputes over the price of imported gas and oil strained relations, while trade with the EU grew. Mining and manufacturing account for more than a quarter of Belarusian GDP. The country has one of the world's largest reserves of potash, mined and made into fertilizer at Salihorsk, and its oil refineries in the Polotsk area and at Mazyr are supplied by a pipeline from western Siberia.

Helped by fertile soils, including a large share of the world's chernozem (black earth), and a favourable climate, Ukraine has a highly developed crop sector. Its output of grain and potatoes is among the highest in Europe, and it is one of the world's largest producers of sugar beets and sunflower oil. A World Bank report of 2021 described Russia's economic model as largely based on the extraction and export of fossil fuels. In 2019 fossil fuels made up 59.9 percent of the country's exports and fossil fuel rents equalled 14.2 percent of GDP, while oil and gas provided 39.3 percent of federal budget revenues.

=== Industry and services ===
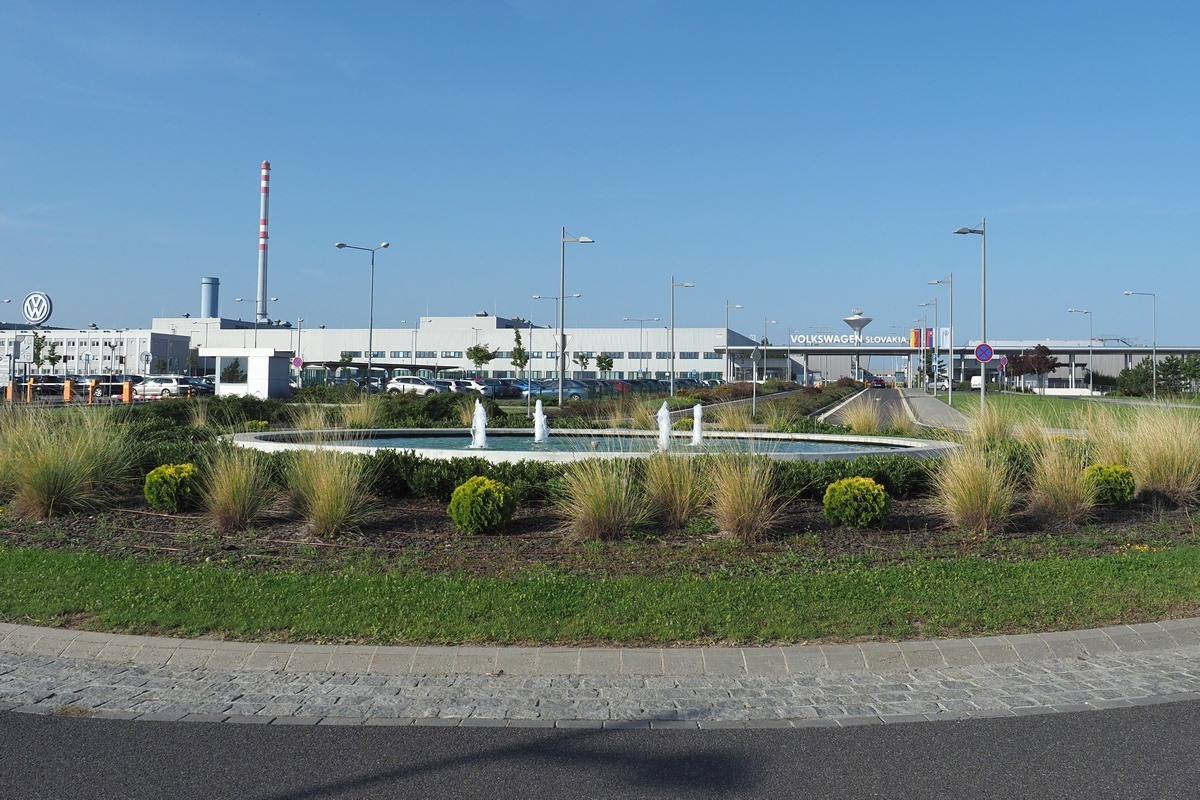
The Volkswagen car plant in Bratislava, Slovakia

The Czech Republic, Slovakia, Romania and Hungary are among the EU's largest car producers. According to provisional figures published by the European Automobile Manufacturers Association (ACEA), the Czech Republic made 1,440,985 cars in 2025, Slovakia 1,073,050, Romania 452,255 and Hungary 411,943, placing them third, fourth, sixth and seventh in the EU. The Czech carmaker Škoda, whose main plant is in Mladá Boleslav, was taken over by Volkswagen in the early 1990s and thoroughly modernized, and in the early 2000s it became the country's biggest export earner, with about one-tenth of all exports. The US International Trade Administration reported that with 1.15 million cars made in 2019, Slovakia led the world in car production per head for the sixth year running, and that automotive production represented about 13.9 percent of Slovakia's GDP.

Between 2013 and 2023 Lithuania recorded the largest relative increase in the EU in the share of total employment held by the information and communications technology (ICT) sector, which nearly doubled from 2.1 to 4.1 percent. Romania (from 1.8 to 3.4 percent) and Bulgaria (from 2.1 to 3.9 percent) also recorded large increases, and in 2023 the sector produced 8.1 percent of gross value added in Bulgaria and 6.6 percent in Latvia, compared with 5.2 percent in the EU as a whole. Estonia's information technology and telecommunications industries began to grow rapidly at the end of the 20th century, and in 2025 the European Commission described the country as positioning itself as a leader in the digitalization of public services. In 2025 Croatia recorded 24.5 nights spent in rented tourist accommodation per inhabitant, the highest tourism intensity in the EU, against an EU average of 7.0.

Farms in Romania and Poland are numerous and mostly small. In 2023 Romania had 2.9 million farms, almost a third (32.6 percent) of all farms in the EU, and Poland had 1.2 million (14.0 percent). Between 2005 and 2023 the largest falls in the number of farms in the EU were in Romania, which lost 1.4 million (33 percent), and Poland, which lost about 1.2 million (50 percent). Nine in ten Romanian farms and about half (50.7 percent) of Polish farms were smaller than 5 hectares (12 acres), and Romania accounted for only 3.7 percent of the standard output of EU agriculture. Poland remains one of the world's leading producers of rye and potatoes.

=== Energy ===
Nuclear power supplies a large part of the electricity in several countries of the region. In 2024 six of its EU members, Bulgaria, Czechia, Hungary, Romania, Slovakia and Slovenia, were among the twelve EU countries with operating nuclear reactors. Slovakia generated 61.6 percent of its electricity in nuclear plants, the second-highest share in the EU after France, and Hungary 42.2 percent, against an EU average of 23.3 percent. Romania, whose nuclear power production began only in 1996, increased its nuclear output by 93.8 percent between 2006 and 2024, the largest rise in the EU. Coal remains important in Poland, Czechia, Bulgaria and Romania, as described under Environment, while Russia's economy depends heavily on the export of oil and gas.

== Demographics ==
=== Population ===
Population pyramid of Eastern Europe in 2023, using the UN geoscheme

Fertility declined considerably between 1980 and the early 2000s, and by 2000 it was below 1.3 children per woman in Bulgaria, Czechia, Latvia and Slovenia, but it rose again in many countries after 2003. In 2024 Bulgaria had the highest fertility rate in the EU, at 1.72 children per woman, and Slovenia the third highest, at 1.52, while Lithuania had one of the lowest, at 1.11. All remain below the replacement level of about 2.1. By 2024 life expectancy in every one of the region's EU members was at or above its level before the COVID-19 pandemic, and Lithuania had gained a full year. The gap between men and women remains wide, and it is the largest in the EU in Latvia, at 9.8 years.

In 2025 deaths outnumbered births in 21 of the 27 EU countries, with the largest natural decrease in Latvia and Bulgaria, but every EU country except Estonia and Latvia gained more people through migration than it lost. This made the population grow in Czechia, Croatia and Slovenia, while it still fell in Bulgaria, Lithuania, Hungary, Poland, Romania and Slovakia.

=== Urbanization ===
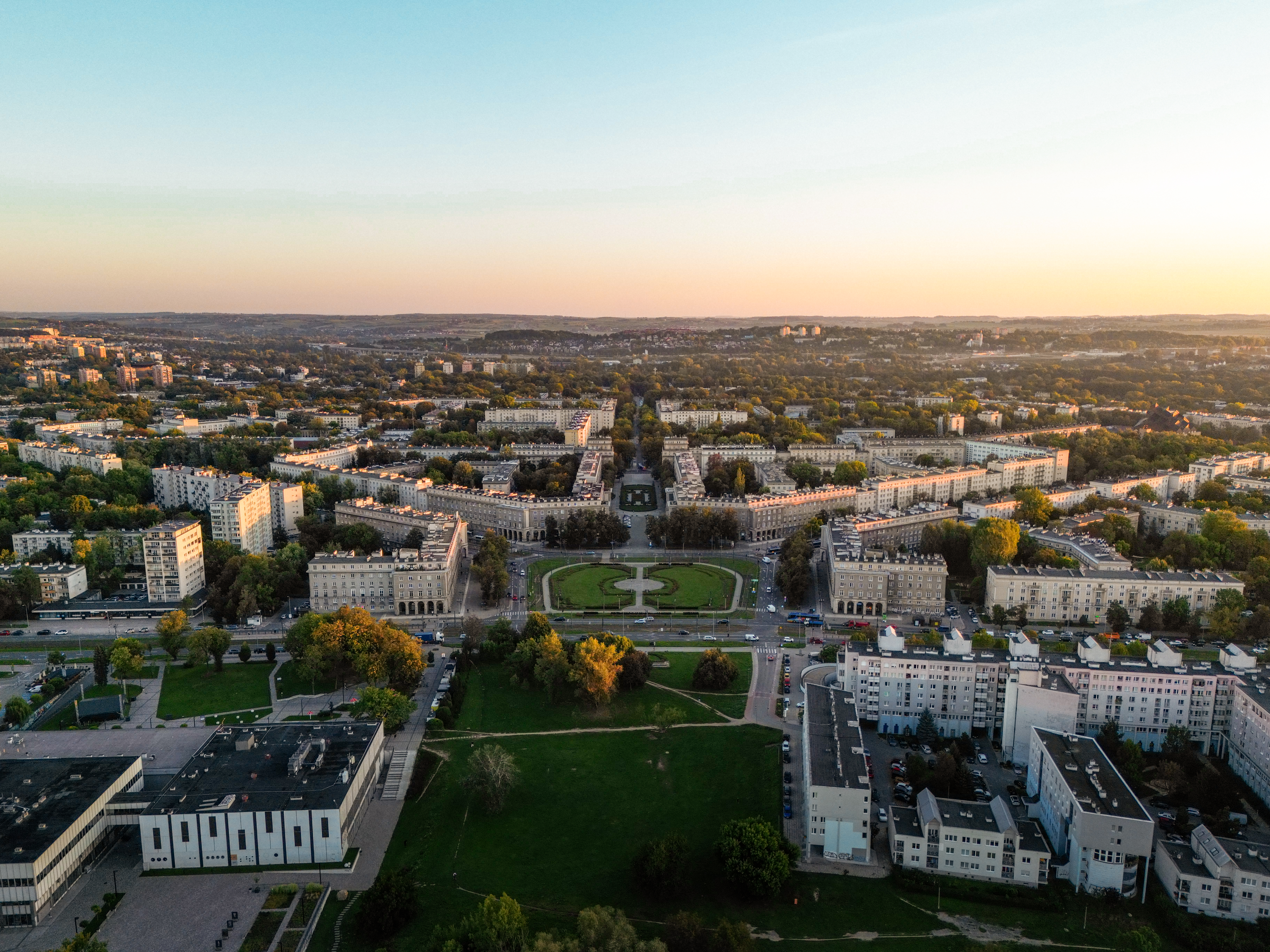
Central Square in Nowa Huta, Kraków, one of the largest planned towns built under communism

Most of the region's countries became much more urban during the communist period. Between 1960 and 1990 the share of people living in urban areas roughly doubled in Belarus, from about a third to two-thirds, and rose from 37 to 67 percent in Bulgaria and from 40 to 68 percent in Lithuania, while in Czechia, which was already mostly urban, it went from 60 to 75 percent. In Bulgaria the urban population overtook the rural for the first time in 1969, and many of the country's modern settlements date from the communist era. In Romania the growth of industry and towns created a large working class, while collectivized farming reshaped rural society. Russia's countryside lost people in the second half of the 20th century, as the young moved away and left many villages mostly to the elderly, and most of its remaining rural population lives in large villages built around the collective and state farms of the Soviet era.

Levels of urbanization still differ widely. In 2025 about four-fifths of the people of Belarus and three-quarters of those of Bulgaria and Russia lived in urban areas, compared with about half in Romania and Slovakia and 44 percent in Moldova. Albania stayed largely rural under communism, with 36 percent of its people in urban areas in 1990, but the share reached 59 percent by 2025. In several countries one city dominates. Moscow, the largest city in Russia, has twice the population of Saint Petersburg, which is in turn much larger than any other Russian city. In 2025 Moscow was one of the world's 33 megacities, cities with more than 10 million inhabitants. Budapest is several times the size of any other city in Hungary, and its metropolitan area holds about a third of the country's urban population. Sofia dominates the economic and cultural life of Bulgaria.

=== Major cities ===
The table lists the 20 largest cities of the region in 2025 according to estimates of the United Nations Population Division, which measures each city as a contiguous, densely populated area rather than within its administrative boundaries, so its figures differ from those of national statistical offices. Cities in the Asian part of Russia are not included.

Largest cities, 2025 (UN estimates)
| Rank | City | Country | Population (thousands) |
|---|---|---|---|
| 1 | Moscow | Russia | 14,525 |
| 2 | Saint Petersburg | Russia | 4,737 |
| 3 | Kyiv | Ukraine | 2,615 |
| 4 | Minsk | Belarus | 1,951 |
| 5 | Bucharest | Romania | 1,910 |
| 6 | Warsaw | Poland | 1,883 |
| 7 | Budapest | Hungary | 1,609 |
| 8 | Kharkiv | Ukraine | 1,309 |
| 9 | Prague | Czechia | 1,198 |
| 10 | Nizhny Novgorod | Russia | 1,197 |
| 11 | Kazan | Russia | 1,133 |
| 12 | Belgrade | Serbia | 1,121 |
| 13 | Sofia | Bulgaria | 1,067 |
| 14 | Rostov-on-Don | Russia | 1,066 |
| 15 | Samara | Russia | 956 |
| 16 | Odesa | Ukraine | 899 |
| 17 | Ufa | Russia | 881 |
| 18 | Voronezh | Russia | 880 |
| 19 | Katowice | Poland | 866 |
| 20 | Tirana | Albania | 833 |

=== Migration ===
After the fall of communism emigration from the region was large and long-lasting. Nearly 20 million people, about 5.5 percent of the population of Central, Eastern and Southeastern Europe, left in the quarter century after 1990, many of them young and well educated, and Southeastern Europe lost a larger share of its workers than the Baltic states and Central Europe. Money sent home by emigrants became an important source of income, reaching about a quarter of GDP in Moldova in 2012, and helped to fund investment, although an IMF study found that the loss of skilled workers slowed growth in the countries they left.

Several countries of the region also receive large numbers of migrants. In 2025 Poland issued 467,314 first residence permits to citizens of non-EU countries, the third-highest number in the EU after Spain and Germany, while Croatia, Romania and Lithuania had the highest shares of permits issued for employment, at 93.0, 81.5 and 78.5 percent. In 2020 Russia hosted about 12 million international migrants, the fourth-largest number in the world after the United States, Germany and Saudi Arabia, while about 11 million people from Russia lived abroad, one of the world's largest diasporas.

=== Ethnic groups ===
The Slavs are the most numerous ethnic and linguistic group in Europe and live chiefly in its east and southeast. They are customarily divided into East Slavs, chiefly Russians, Ukrainians and Belarusians, West Slavs, chiefly Poles, Czechs and Slovaks, and South Slavs, chiefly Serbs, Croats, Bosniaks, Slovenes, Macedonians and Montenegrins. Bulgarians, though of mixed origin, also speak a Slavic language.

The region's other large nations are the Romanians, the Hungarians, the Lithuanians and Latvians, the Estonians and the Albanians. Like most European peoples, each is concentrated in a national homeland of its own. In Moldova about three-quarters of the people are Romance-speaking ethnic Moldovans, alongside smaller groups of Ukrainians, Russians, Gagauz, Roma and Bulgarians. The Gagauz, a mainly rural people whose language is Turkic in origin, have lived on the Bugeac Plain since the late 18th century and have their own autonomous area, Gagauzia.

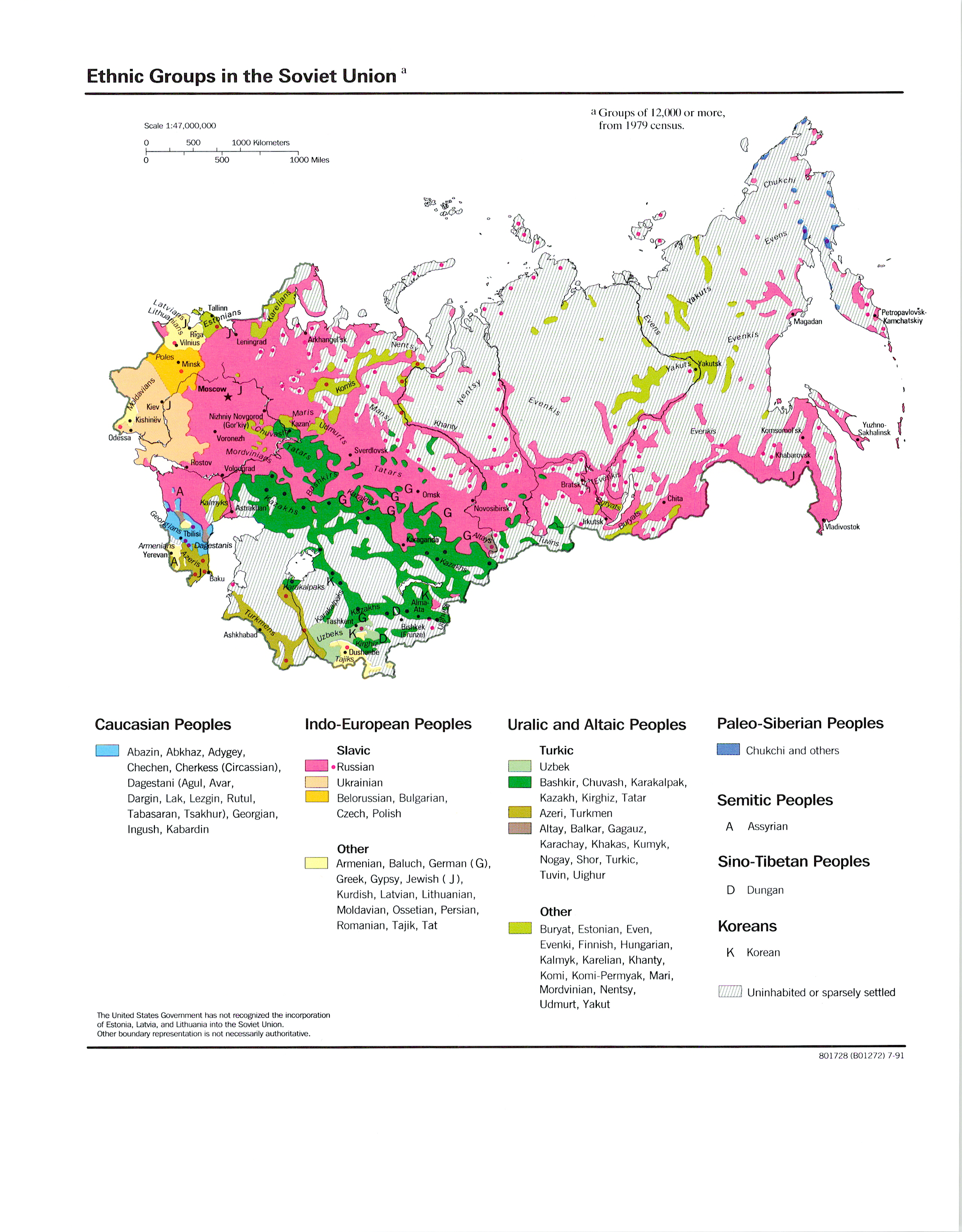
Ethnic groups in the western USSR at the 1979 census, from a CIA map
Russians Ukrainians
Belarusians and Poles
Lithuanians, Latvians, Moldovans
Tatars, Chuvash, Bashkirs, Kazakhs
Uralic peoples and Kalmyks
Peoples of the Caucasus

Russia alone has more than 120 ethnic groups speaking about 100 languages, many of them with their own national territories, although ethnic Russians make up more than four-fifths of its population. The larger non-Russian peoples include the Turkic-speaking Tatars, Chuvash and Bashkirs, who live between the middle Volga and the southern Urals, and the Chechens. The Tatars alone numbered more than 5 million in the late 20th century. Uralic peoples such as the Mordvins, Mari, Udmurts and Komi live around the upper Volga and in the Urals, and the Karelians in the northwest, while the Mongolian-speaking Kalmyks live west of the lower Volga. The North Caucasus is home to many smaller peoples, among them the Circassians, the Ingush, the Avars and other peoples of Dagestan, and the Indo-Iranian-speaking Ossetians. The Cossacks grew out of self-governing military communities formed on the Dnieper and the Don by peasants who had fled serfdom in Poland, Lithuania and Muscovy. They later served the Russian Empire as frontier troops and were early colonists of Siberia, and under Soviet rule their communities ceased to function as administrative units.

Border changes and migration left many national minorities. About a third of the 10 million ethnic Hungarians were left outside Hungary after the Treaty of Trianon in 1920, and many live in Transylvania in Romania. Ethnic Germans, about 4 percent of Romania's population in 1930, had almost all left by the early 21st century after deportations and emigration. Turks make up about a tenth of Bulgaria's citizens. The communist government expelled 155,000 of them in 1949–51, and about 300,000 emigrated in 1989, although almost half of these returned after 1991. Russians make up about a quarter of the population of Estonia and of Latvia. The Roma, who originated in northern India and speak Romani, live in large numbers in Romania, Bulgaria, Hungary, Slovakia, the Czech Republic and the former Yugoslav countries, and about 6 million of the estimated 10 to 12 million Roma in Europe live in the EU.

=== Languages ===
Countries where a Slavic language is the national language West Slavic East Slavic South Slavic

The Slavic languages fall into an eastern branch of Russian, Ukrainian and Belarusian, a western branch that includes Polish, Czech and Slovak, and a southern branch of Slovene, Serbo-Croatian, Macedonian and Bulgarian. Serbs, Bosniaks and Croats speak forms of the same language, Serbo-Croatian, which each group generally calls by its own name. Romanian is a Romance language, Lithuanian and Latvian make up the Baltic family, and Albanian is the only survivor of an ancient branch of Indo-European that was once spoken across the Balkans north of Greece. The Roma speak Romani, which has its origins in the Indic branch of the same family. Hungarian and Estonian belong to the non-Indo-European Uralic family, which also has speakers in the middle Volga region, and Turkic languages are spoken in parts of the Balkans, the Caucasus and southern Russia.

Religion has traditionally divided the Slavs into an Orthodox group, chiefly the Russians, most Ukrainians and Belarusians, most Bulgarians, the Serbs and the Macedonians, and a Catholic group, chiefly the Poles, Czechs, Slovaks, Croats and Slovenes. The first group, together with all Ukrainians and Belarusians, writes in the Cyrillic alphabet and the second in the Latin alphabet. The first Slavic alphabet, Glagolitic, was invented in the 9th century by the missionaries Saints Cyril and Methodius, who translated the Bible into Old Church Slavonic. Cyrillic was created in the 10th century by their disciples in the First Bulgarian Empire, who based it on Greek capital letters, and two of those disciples, Clement of Ohrid and Naum, are sometimes credited with devising it. Its Russian form has since been adapted to many non-Slavic languages. Croats write in the Latin alphabet, which is associated with Catholicism and western Europe, while Serbs use both alphabets.

In Moldova the language was written in Cyrillic under Russian and Soviet rule and changed to the Latin alphabet in 1989, and since then the Gagauz have also developed a Latin script for their language. Russian is used as a second language in the other former Soviet republics, and in the second half of the 20th century it was taught widely in the countries under Soviet influence, especially in Eastern Europe.

=== Religion ===
In a 2017 survey of 18 countries in Central and Eastern Europe, the Pew Research Center found that Orthodox Christianity was the dominant religion of the region and the majority faith in ten of the countries, while four had Catholic majorities and Bosnia and Herzegovina, Estonia and Latvia had no single majority group. The region also has sizeable Muslim populations, and Lutherans form notable shares in some countries. The Czech Republic was the only country where most adults (72 percent) had no religious affiliation, and in Estonia a plurality (45 percent) had none. The communist governments repressed religious worship and promoted atheism, but since their fall religion has reasserted itself as an important part of individual and national identity in many of these countries. In Russia and Poland, for example, majorities say that being Orthodox or Catholic is important to being truly Russian or truly Polish.

Protestantism is strongest in Estonia and Latvia, where the local German nobility had converted much of the peasantry to Lutheranism by the mid-16th century. Lutherans made up 79 percent of Estonians and 55 percent of Latvians in 1939, but only about one in five adults in each country in 2017. Pew links this decline partly to lasting tensions, as many people associated the Lutheran churches with the German upper classes, and in the Soviet period the churches generally gave in to Soviet demands, including a ban on religious instruction. Hungarians are one of the few European peoples among whom Catholicism and Protestantism have long coexisted.

==== Orthodoxy ====
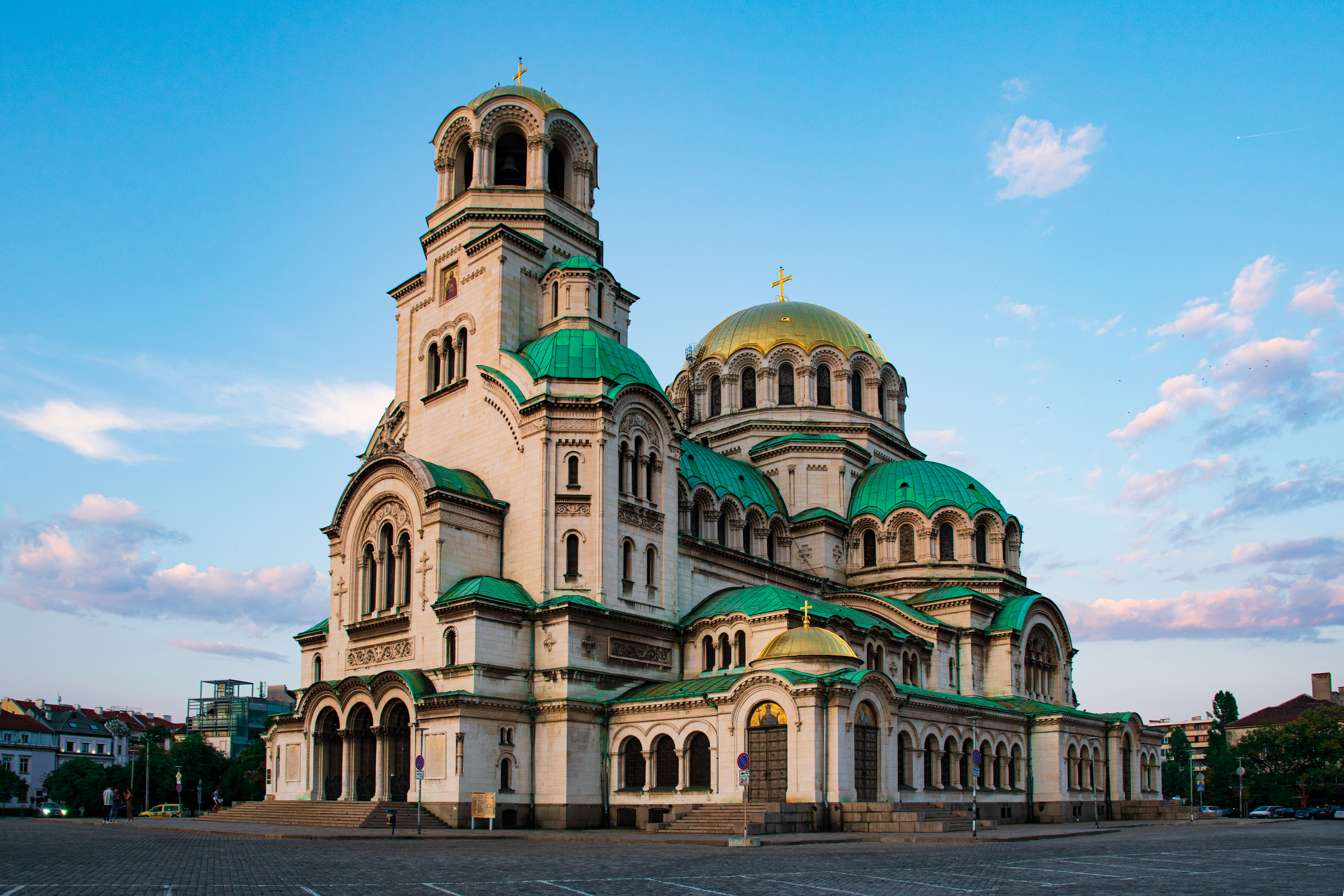
The Alexander Nevsky Cathedral of the Bulgarian Orthodox Church in Sofia

Eastern Christianity reached much of the region from Constantinople. According to church tradition, Byzantine missionaries brought what is now called Orthodox Christianity to Bulgaria, Serbia and Moravia in the 9th century and to Russia from the 10th century. The Bulgarian ruler Boris I had first intended to accept Christianity from Rome but adopted the Orthodox faith of Constantinople in 864 after an unsuccessful war with the Byzantines, and Bulgaria soon received its own archbishopric. In 886 he gave refuge to Clement, Naum and other disciples of Cyril and Methodius who had been driven out of Moravia, and they founded centres of Slavic learning at Pliska, Preslav and Ohrid. Vladimir I, grand prince of Kyiv and the first Christian ruler of Kievan Rus', was baptized under a pact with the Byzantine emperor made in about 987. He then ordered the conversion of Kyiv and Novgorod, whose new church used the Byzantine rite in Old Church Slavonic under a Greek metropolitan. After the schism of 1054 between the Eastern and Western churches, Orthodoxy spread across the lands that became the Russian Empire. In 1219 Saint Sava received the title of autocephalous archbishop of Serbia from the patriarch of Constantinople, then in exile at Nicaea, countering his brother the king's leaning towards Rome.

In 2017 the highest Orthodox shares were in Moldova (92 percent) and Romania (86 percent), and the largest Orthodox populations were in Russia and Ukraine. Nearly four in five of the world's Orthodox Christians live in Europe, and a majority live in the former Soviet republics.

In Russia a church council restored the patriarchate in November 1917 and elected Tikhon as patriarch, but the Soviet government nationalized church lands and carried out brutal persecutions, destroying churches and arresting and executing many clergy. The church had rallied behind the Soviet government when the war with Germany began in 1941, and in 1943 Joseph Stalin reversed his religious policy. On 4 September he received the three leading metropolitans, Sergius, Alexy and Nikolai, in the Kremlin and allowed them to open a limited number of churches and religious schools and to hold a council, which on 8 September elected Sergius patriarch. Sergius in turn declared Stalin the divinely anointed ruler, beginning an uneasy collaboration between church and state. The regime used the church as a symbol of national unity and to counter Germany's use of religion in the occupied territories. The new tolerance did not extend to every faith, as Islam and Judaism remained under suspicion. A Council for the Affairs of the Russian Orthodox Church, headed by Georgy Karpov, a former NKVD officer, was set up after the meeting. Thousands of churches reopened, and by the late 1950s their number had reached 25,000, but a new and widespread persecution followed under Nikita Khrushchev and Leonid Brezhnev. Under Mikhail Gorbachev many church buildings were returned to the church, and after the Soviet Union dissolved, Russian nationalists came to see the Russian Orthodox Church as a major element of Russian culture. By 2017 Russia's Orthodox population had passed 100 million, a sharp rise after the fall of the Soviet Union.

The Orthodox Church is a fellowship of autocephalous, or self-governing, churches, in which the Ecumenical Patriarch of Constantinople holds a primacy of honour. The Russian church became autocephalous under a metropolitan in Moscow in 1448 and gained its own patriarch in 1589, but Peter the Great abolished the patriarchate in 1721 and turned the church's central administration into a state department, the Holy Synod. In the 17th century the Old Believers separated from the Russian church. In the Balkans, as Ottoman rule receded, the birth of national states was followed by the creation of independent national churches. The Romanian church declared itself autocephalous in 1865, which Constantinople recognized in 1885, the Serbian church was recognized as autocephalous in 1879, and a separate Bulgarian church, the Bulgarian Exarchate, was created by a decree of the sultan in 1870. Other autocephalous churches in the region include those of Poland, Albania, and the Czech Lands and Slovakia.

==== Catholicism ====
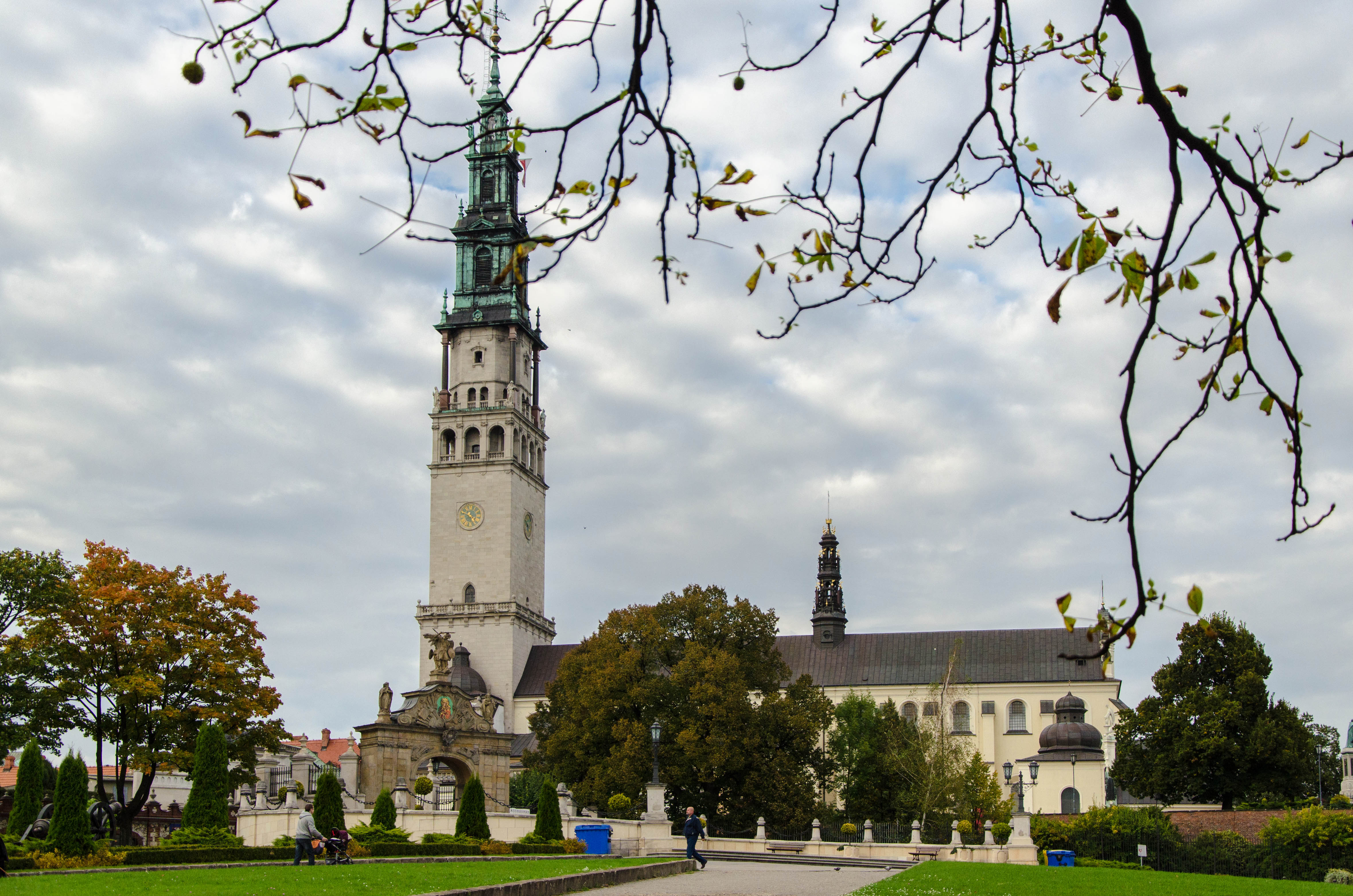
The Catholic monastery of Jasna Góra in Częstochowa, Poland

Western Christianity reached much of the region from Rome. The Polish ruler Mieszko I accepted Christianity from Rome in 966 to avoid forced conversion by the Germans and the absorption of Poland into the Holy Roman Empire. Stephen I made the Hungarians part of the Western Church and was crowned king on Christmas Day 1000, by tradition with a crown sent by Pope Sylvester II. Lithuania was the last pagan country in Europe and accepted Catholicism in the late 14th century.

In 2017 Catholics made up 87 percent of adults in Poland, 84 percent in Croatia, 75 percent in Lithuania and 56 percent in Hungary. In the Czech Republic, by contrast, their share fell from 44 percent in 1991 to 21 percent. In communist Hungary, Cardinal József Mindszenty was arrested in 1948 for refusing to allow Catholic schools to be secularized and was sentenced to life imprisonment in 1949. Freed during the uprising of 1956, he then took refuge in the United States embassy in Budapest. In Lithuania Catholicism persisted through decades in which the Soviet state promoted atheism. John Paul II, pope from 1978 to 2005, was the first pope from a Slavic country, and his emphasis on nonviolent political activism aided the Solidarity movement in communist Poland in the 1980s.

Several of the region's Eastern Christian communities formed churches in union with Rome, in the past often called Uniate and today known as Eastern Catholic or Greek Catholic churches. They accept the Catholic faith, its sacraments and the pope as their head, but keep their own liturgy, spirituality, sacred art and, above all, their own organization. The largest, the Ukrainian Greek Catholic Church, grew out of the Union of Brest of 1596, which created a Uniate church for Orthodox Ukrainians and Belarusians in the Polish–Lithuanian Commonwealth. The metropolitan of Kyiv and all but two of the Orthodox bishops agreed to enter communion with Rome on condition that their traditional rites were preserved, while other Orthodox clergy and laity, among them the Zaporozhian Cossacks, opposed the union. The Union of Uzhhorod of 1646 created a similar church among the Ruthenians, whose priests kept their Old Church Slavonic liturgy and customs. Under Soviet rule a synod held in 1946, which Britannica calls spurious, broke the Ukrainian church's union with Rome and merged it into the Russian Orthodox Church. The church survived underground until it was legalized again in December 1989.

==== Islam ====
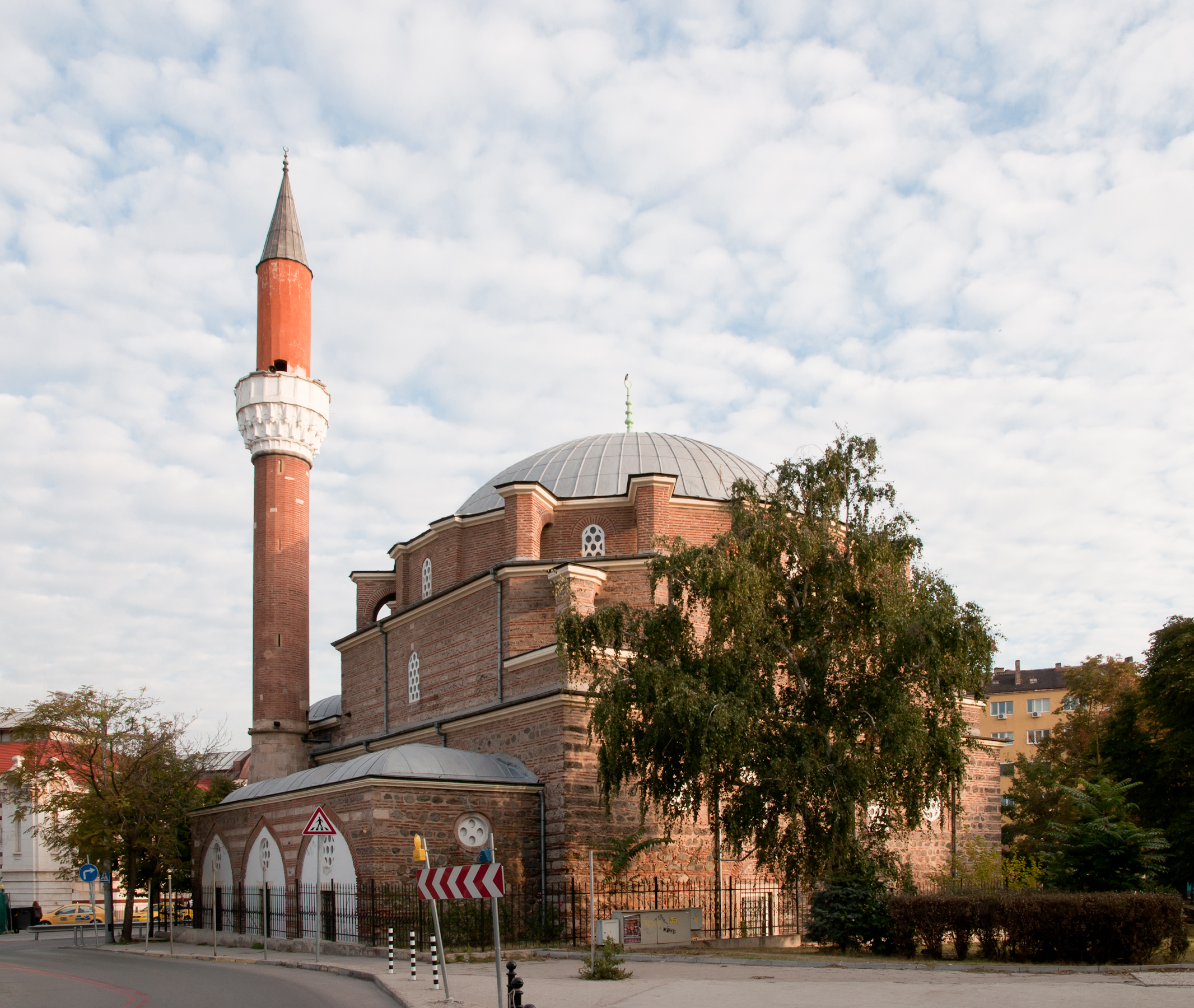
The Banya Bashi Mosque in Sofia, built under Ottoman rule

Under Ottoman rule many inhabitants of what is now Bosnia and Herzegovina adopted Islam, and in 2017 about half of Bosnian adults (52 percent) were Muslim, and Bosnia was the only one of the four surveyed countries with large Muslim populations where most Muslims said religion was very important in their lives. Albania is predominantly Muslim, also as a legacy of nearly five centuries of Ottoman rule. Most of its Muslims are Sunni, and the next largest group follows the Bektashi order. In 1967 Albania's communist rulers proclaimed it an atheist state and began closing all churches and mosques and banning religious observance. About a third of the people of North Macedonia are Muslim, among them the Turks and most Albanians and Roma, and Bulgaria also has a Muslim minority.

The Volga Bulgars, who lived around the confluence of the Volga and Kama rivers, converted to Islam in about 922. Muslims are now the second largest religious group in Russia, and most of its Turkic-speaking peoples are Muslim, among them the Tatars, whose ancestors in the Golden Horde converted to Sunni Islam in the 14th century. In the North Caucasus the Chechens and the Ingush are also Muslim peoples. Farther west, the Lipka Tatars have lived since the 14th century in an area that straddles the borders of Poland, Lithuania and Belarus, making them one of Europe's oldest continuously existing Muslim communities. Their wooden mosque at Kruszyniany, probably built in the second half of the 18th century, is the oldest in Poland.

== Culture ==
=== Literature ===
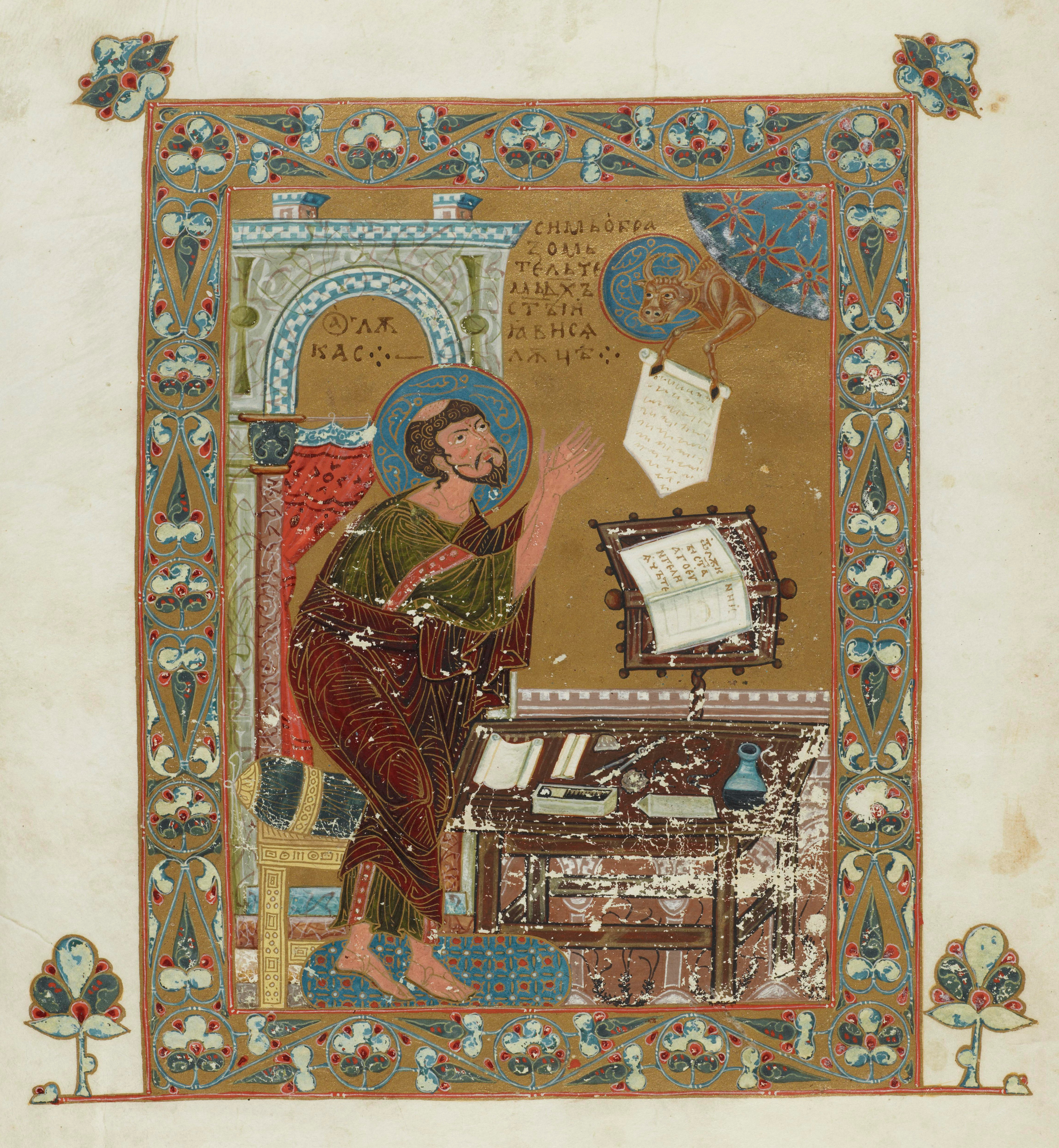
Miniature of Saint Luke in the Ostromir Gospels, 1056–1057

When Kievan Rus' adopted Christianity in 988, a standardized written language, Old Church Slavonic, pioneered in the 9th century by Saints Cyril and Methodius, was already available. Bulgaria, which had been Christianized a century earlier, passed on Greek culture translated into Old Church Slavonic, and scribes in Kievan Rus' soon began copying and translating works themselves. Almost all translations were from Greek, and most were of religious interest. The Ostromir Gospels of 1056–1057 is the oldest dated manuscript from Kievan Rus', and the Primary Chronicle, compiled about 1113, led to the writing of other chronicles elsewhere.

After the suppression of the November Uprising of 1830–1831 much of the Polish cultural elite went into exile in France, among them Adam Mickiewicz, the leader of the Romantic period, whose works include the epic poem Pan Tadeusz (1834). The poet and revolutionary Sándor Petőfi symbolized the Hungarian desire for freedom and played a leading role in literary life in the period before the Hungarian Revolution of 1848. Mihai Eminescu transformed both the form and the content of Romanian poetry, and Petar II Petrović-Njegoš, prince-bishop of Montenegro from 1830 to 1851, was renowned especially as a poet.

In Russia the 19th century began with the "Golden Age" of poetry. Russians view Alexander Pushkin as their greatest poet, and his novel Eugene Onegin (written 1823–1831) was probably his greatest work. Leo Tolstoy wrote War and Peace (1865–1869), set in the time of the Napoleonic Wars, and Anna Karenina (1875–1877), and Fyodor Dostoevsky wrote Crime and Punishment (1866). The plays of Anton Chekhov, among them The Seagull (1896) and The Cherry Orchard (1904), are regarded as a high point of Russian drama.

In the Soviet Union all independent literary groups were dissolved in 1932 and replaced by the Union of Soviet Writers, which became the state's instrument of control over literature, and in 1934 socialist realism was proclaimed the only acceptable form of writing. After the death of Joseph Stalin in 1953, writing critical of the government circulated as samizdat, typically carbon copies of typewritten sheets passed by hand from reader to reader. Boris Pasternak's novel Doctor Zhivago was first published in Italy in 1957, and Aleksandr Solzhenitsyn, author of One Day in the Life of Ivan Denisovich and The Gulag Archipelago, was later expelled from the Soviet Union. Writers born in the region who were awarded the Nobel Prize in Literature include Henryk Sienkiewicz (1905), Władysław Reymont (1924), Ivan Bunin (1933), Pasternak (1958), Ivo Andrić (1961), Mikhail Sholokhov (1965), Solzhenitsyn (1970), Czesław Miłosz (1980), Jaroslav Seifert (1984), Joseph Brodsky (1987), Wisława Szymborska (1996), Imre Kertész (2002), Olga Tokarczuk (2018) and László Krasznahorkai (2025).

=== Music ===
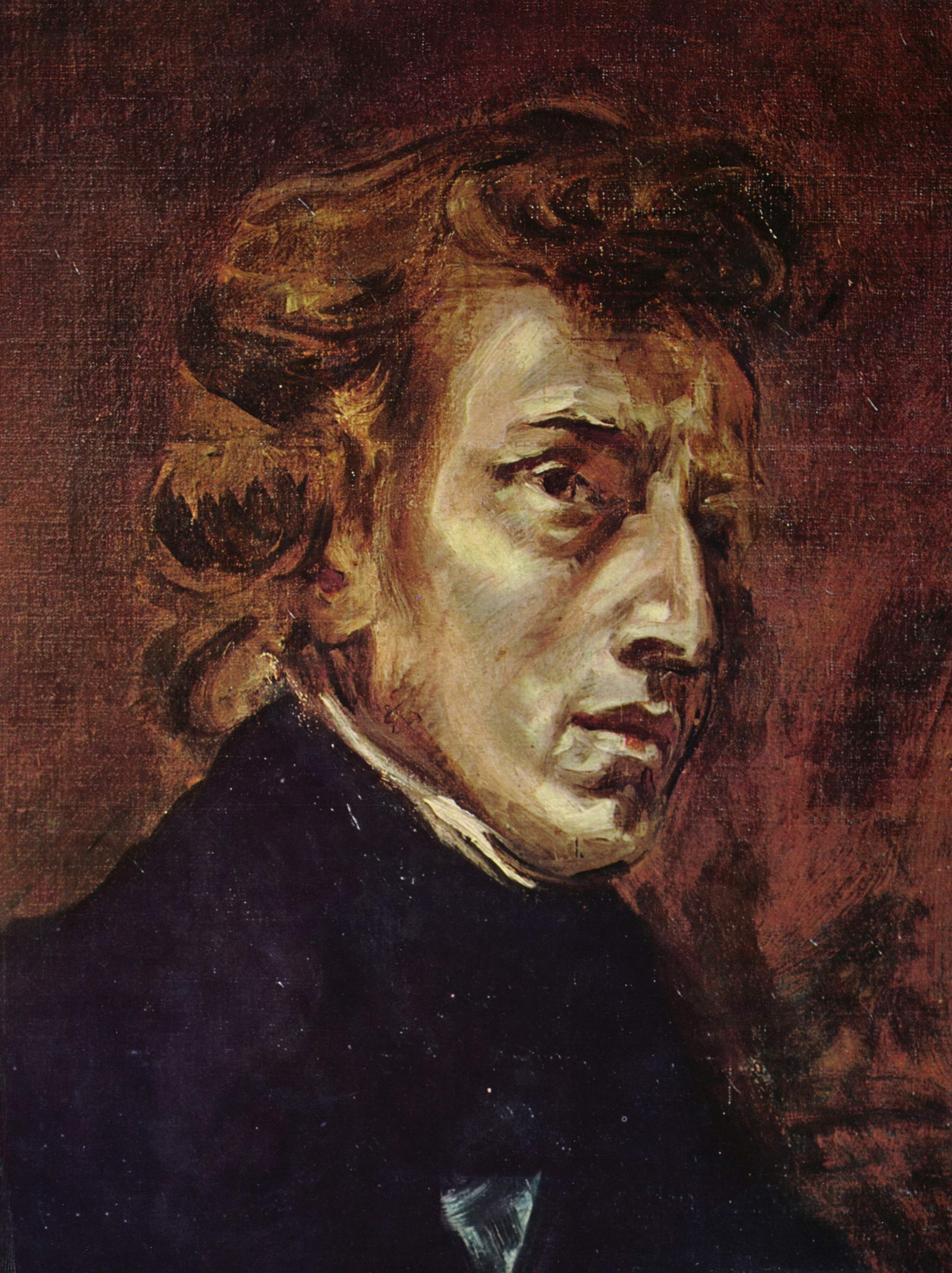
Frédéric Chopin in an 1838 portrait by Eugène Delacroix

Until the 18th century Russian music consisted mainly of church music and folk songs and dances. In the first half of the 19th century Mikhail Glinka began applying Russian folk and religious music to classical composition, and his operas A Life for the Tsar and Ruslan and Lyudmila are considered pioneering works of Russian national music. The composers known as the Mighty Five, among them Mily Balakirev, Modest Mussorgsky and Nikolai Rimsky-Korsakov, continued Glinka's move away from imitating European classical music, while Pyotr Ilyich Tchaikovsky, whose ballets include Swan Lake and The Nutcracker, wrote works more imitative of Western music. The generation that followed at the end of the 19th century included the pianist and composer Sergei Rachmaninoff.

The composer and pianist Frédéric Chopin, born near Warsaw, wrote some 57 mazurkas for piano, based on a Polish folk dance, which reflect his interest in the music of his homeland. The Hungarian piano virtuoso Franz Liszt wrote 12 symphonic poems and a great variety of solo piano pieces. In Bohemia Bedřich Smetana and Antonín Dvořák, like the Mighty Five in Russia, belonged to a group of nationalist composers who reacted against German dominance of instrumental music and sought to reflect national distinctiveness.

Leoš Janáček was one of the most important exponents of musical nationalism of the 20th century, and the Romanian violinist and composer George Enescu wrote two Romanian rhapsodies and an overture on Romanian folk themes. Béla Bartók and Zoltán Kodály collected Hungarian peasant music in the remotest corners of Hungary and incorporated its melodic, rhythmic and textural elements into their own compositions. Igor Stravinsky composed the ballets The Firebird, Petrushka and The Rite of Spring before he emigrated permanently in 1920. In the Soviet Union Sergei Prokofiev and Dmitri Shostakovich were among the composers condemned in 1948 in the postwar crackdown known as the Zhdanovshchina, and Shostakovich enjoyed substantial recognition after the thaw that liberated artistic activities after 1953.

=== Visual arts and architecture ===
The 18th-century wooden churches of the Kizhi Pogost

After the acceptance of Christianity in 988, Byzantine religious art and architecture reached Kievan Rus', and the tradition of painting icons, religious images usually painted on wooden panels, spread as more churches were built. In the early 15th century the icon painter Andrei Rublev created some of Russia's most treasured religious art. The churches of northern Moldavia, built from the late 15th to the late 16th century, have external walls covered in fresco paintings inspired by Byzantine art, which form complete cycles of religious themes on all the facades. The Kizhi Pogost, on an island in Lake Onega, has two multi-domed wooden churches from the 18th century, which bear evidence of highly developed carpentry skills.

According to UNESCO, the Gothic buildings of the 14th and 15th centuries, the High Baroque of the first half of the 18th century and the rising modernism after 1900 in Prague influenced the development of Central European architecture, and in the early 1900s Riga became the European city with the highest concentration of Art Nouveau architecture. The Moravian-born painter Alphonse Mucha, one of the foremost designers in the Art Nouveau style, painted the Slav Epic, a series of 20 large historical paintings (1912–1930) on the history of the Slavic peoples, and donated it to the city of Prague. Among the most innovative and influential Russian artists of the early 20th century were the painters Wassily Kandinsky and Natalia Goncharova. The constructivists of the 1920s found parallels between their work and the precepts of the Bolshevik Revolution. By the 1930s the government limited all forms of artistic expression to the themes of socialist realism and forbade abstract forms.

=== Science ===
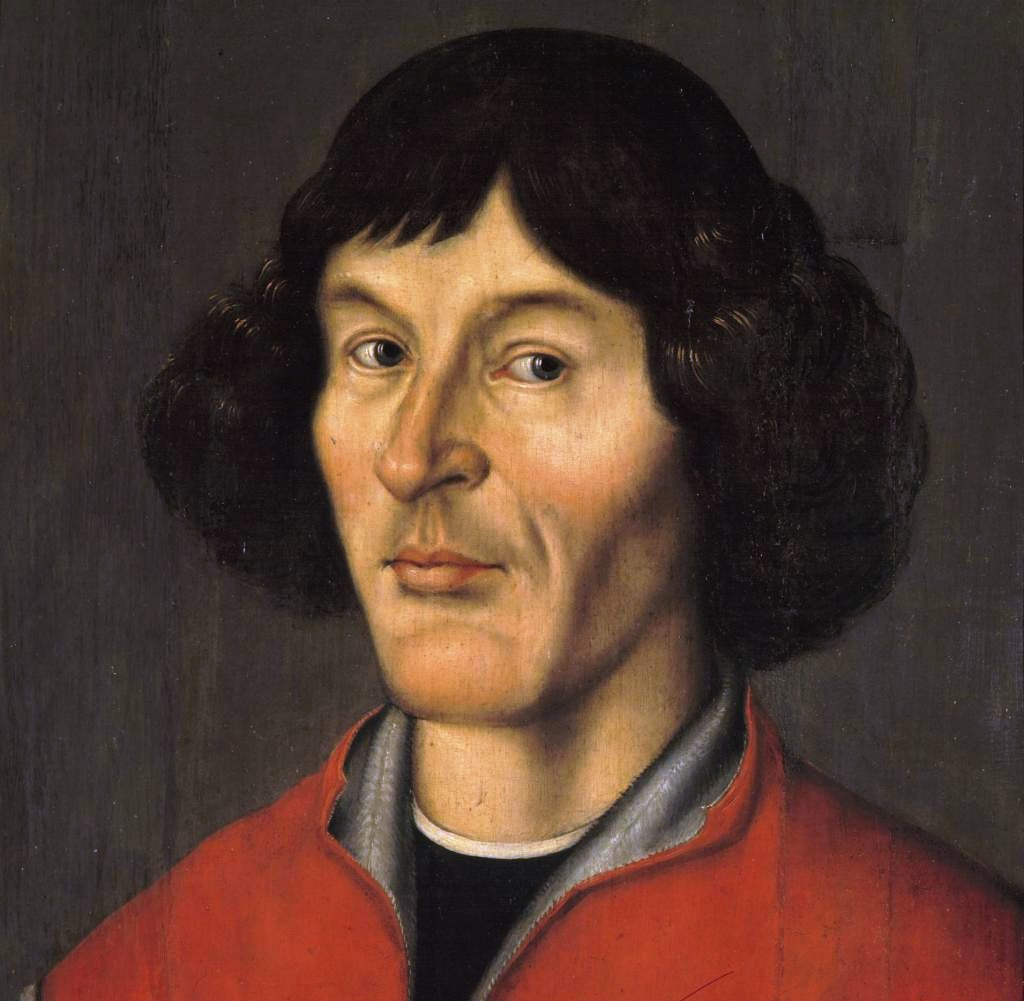
Nicolaus Copernicus in a portrait from the town hall of Toruń, about 1580

The Polish astronomer Nicolaus Copernicus proposed that the planets have the Sun as their fixed point and that the Earth is itself a planet orbiting the Sun. His book De revolutionibus orbium coelestium was published in 1543, the year of his death. The Russian mathematician Nikolai Lobachevsky founded non-Euclidean geometry, which he developed independently of János Bolyai and Carl Friedrich Gauss and first published in 1829. Dmitri Mendeleev announced his periodic law in 1869, and in his version of the periodic table of 1871 he left gaps for unknown elements and predicted the likely properties of three of them. Marie Skłodowska-Curie, born in Warsaw, discovered polonium and radium with Pierre Curie and became the first person to be awarded two Nobel Prizes, in physics in 1903 and in chemistry in 1911.

Nikola Tesla, born in Smiljan in the Austrian Empire (now in Croatia), discovered and patented the rotating magnetic field, the basis of most alternating current machinery. Ivan Pavlov received the 1904 Nobel Prize in Physiology or Medicine for his work on the physiology of digestion, and his research on behaviour using dogs became the basis of behaviourism. The Soviet Union inaugurated the space age on 4 October 1957 with the launch of Sputnik 1, the first artificial satellite, which led to the Space Race with the United States. On 12 April 1961 Yuri Gagarin became the first person in space aboard Vostok 1, and on the Vostok 6 flight of 16–19 June 1963 Valentina Tereshkova became the first woman in space.

=== Cuisine ===
A Christmas Eve supper (Wigilia) in Poland, with pierogi

In Russia traditional foods such as cabbage, potatoes, carrots, sour cream and apples remain popular, as does kvass, a traditional drink that can be made at home from stale black bread. Vodka is traditionally drunk straight and followed by salt herring, a sour cucumber, a pickled mushroom or rye bread with butter. Pierogi, dumplings filled with meat, vegetables or fruit, are also popular in other Slavic countries, but in no other cuisine are they as central to national identity as in Polish cuisine. Paprika is especially associated with Hungarian cuisine and is essential for stews such as goulash, the traditional stew of Hungary. Romanian cuisine owes much to Turkish and Greek cooking, with staples such as thick cabbage soup and stuffed cabbage leaves and desserts such as baklava, and Bosnian cuisine shows Turkish influence in stuffed vegetables, coffee, sweet cakes of the baklava type and the national dish of ćevapi. In southeastern Europe, as in Turkey, sheep's and goat's milk are preferred for making yogurt.

=== Sport ===
A physical culture parade on Red Square in Moscow, 1 May 1958

The Soviet Union first took part in the Olympic Games at the 1952 Summer Olympics in Helsinki, where it won 71 medals to the 76 of the United States, and Hungary won 42. At the same Games Emil Zátopek of Czechoslovakia won the 5,000 and 10,000 metres and, in his first attempt at the event, the marathon. Hungary's national football team, known as the "Magical Magyars", with Ferenc Puskás as its centrepiece, recorded 43 wins, 7 draws and 1 loss between 1950 and 1956. Its one defeat came in the final of the 1954 World Cup, and it won the Olympic gold medal in 1952. The Polish national football team won the Olympic gold medal in 1972 and finished third at the 1974 World Cup.

Canada dominated international ice hockey until the emergence of the Soviet team in the early 1960s, and the Soviets remained the most powerful team in international hockey until the 1990s and the dissolution of the Soviet Union. As part of a general encouragement of chess, the Soviet Union endorsed separate women's tournaments, and the resulting improvement in playing strength led to Soviet domination of women's chess for more than 30 years. Players of the Soviet chess school, who regarded the initiative as vitally important, dominated the World Chess Championship from 1948 to 1972. The Romanian gymnast Nadia Comăneci was the first gymnast to be awarded a perfect score of 10 in an Olympic event, and at the 1976 Summer Olympics in Montreal she received seven perfect scores.

== See also ==
- Community for Democracy and Rights of Nations
- Eastern European Group
- Eastern Partnership
- Enlargement of the European Union
- Eurasian Economic Union
- Euronest Parliamentary Assembly
- European Union
- European Russia
- Eurovoc
- Geography of the Soviet Union
- Intermarium
- List of Intangible Cultural Heritage elements in Eastern Europe
- List of political parties in Eastern Europe
- Organization of the Black Sea Economic Cooperation
- Post-Soviet states
- Potential enlargement of the European Union

European subregions

- Eurovoc § Eastern Europe
- East-Central Europe
- Central and Eastern Europe
- Central Europe
- Geographical midpoint of Europe
- Northern Europe
- Regions of Europe
- Southeast Europe
- Western Europe

== Sources ==
- Lens, Lennart (2019). The Forgotten Holocaust: The systematic genocide on the Slavic people by the Nazis during the Second World War (BA thesis). Archived from the original on 25 June 2021 – via Leiden University.
