= Chapel of the Resurrection, Brussels =

Church in Brussels, Belgium

Chapel of the Resurrection
- Chapelle de la Résurrection (French); Verrijzeniskapel (Dutch)
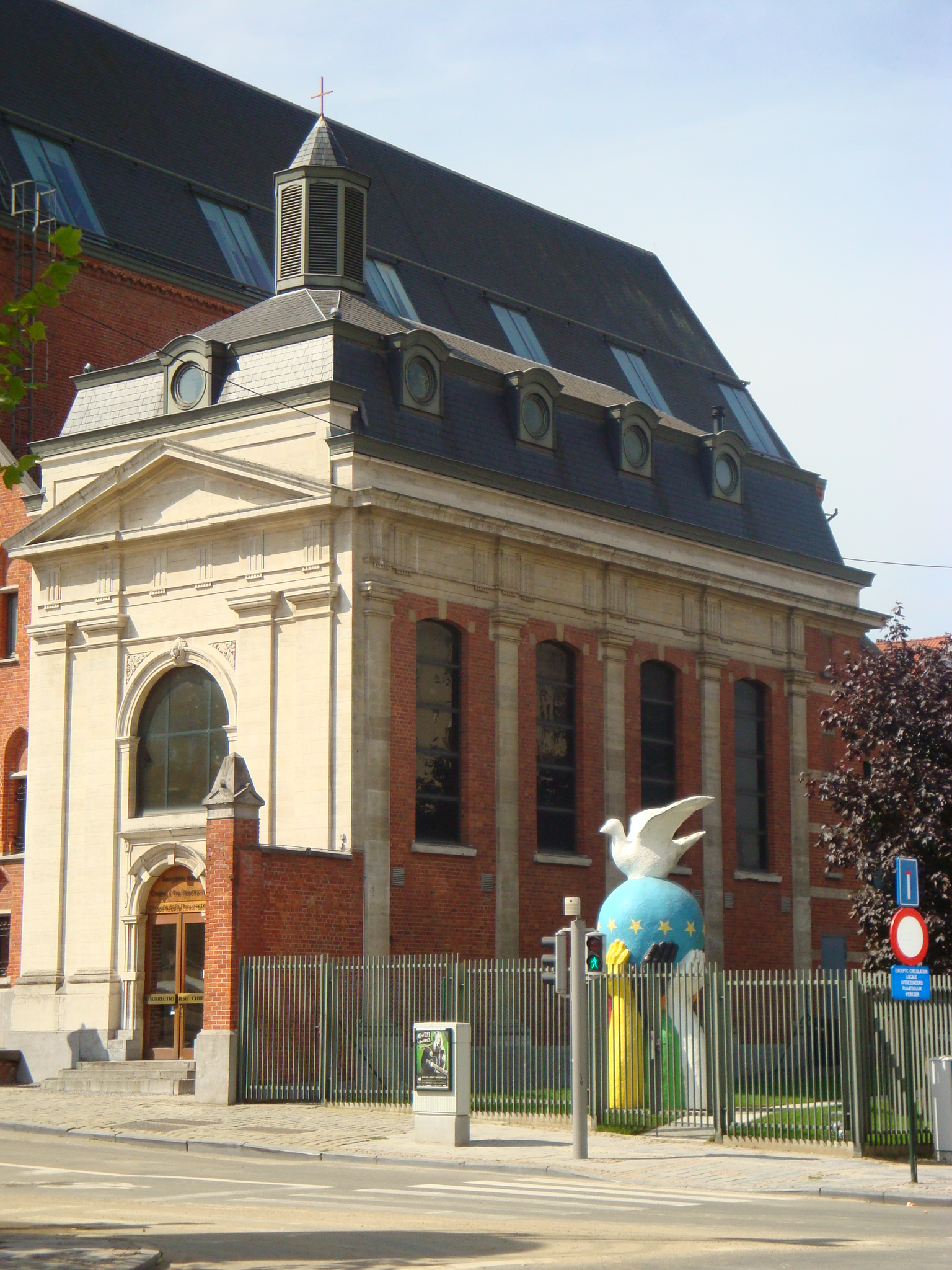
- Chapel of the Resurrection and Statue of Europe in Brussels
- Chapel of the Resurrection
- 50.84138°N 4.37857°E
- Location: Rue Van Maerlant / Van Maerlantstraat 22–24; 1000 City of Brussels, Brussels-Capital Region
- Country: Belgium
- Denomination: Catholic Church

Architecture
- Functional status: Active
- Architectural type: Church
- Style: Renaissance Revival (exterior)

Administration
- Archdiocese: Mechelen–Brussels

Clergy
- Archbishop: Luc Terlinden (Primate of Belgium)

The Chapel of the Resurrection (French: Chapelle de la Résurrection; Dutch: Verrijzeniskapel), or the Chapel for Europe (French: Chapelle pour l'Europe; Dutch: Europakapel), is a Catholic church with an ecumenical vocation located in the heart of the Brussels' European Quarter (City of Brussels municipality), next to the former Convent Van Maerlant.

A precursor of this church, which dated back to the 15th century, was situated in the city centre, but demolished in the course of urban development in 1907. Instead, a replica, externally true to the original, was built at its present location. In 2001, after substantial renovation, the church received its present name and took on its present ecumenical character.

== History ==
The history of the building goes back to the Chapelle du Saint-Sacrement de Miracle ("Chapel of the Miraculous Sacrament"), which was built on the Rue des Sols/Stuiversstraat in the city centre in 1455. Because of urban development measures, the chapel had to give way for the construction of Brussels-Central railway station. The original chapel and adjoining convent was scheduled for demolition and a duplicate was built on the Rue Van Maerlant/Van Maerlantstraat by the expropriated Order Sisters of Perpetual Adoration. This new chapel was inaugurated on 14 October 1908.

In 1974, the sisters decided to sell the convent—which comprised what is now the entire block—while the main building today accommodates the Library and a visitors' centre of the European Commission. The chapel was sold to an international non-profit association constituted under Belgian law, which had been founded by members of the EU institutions in order to maintain the chapel as a space for prayer and liturgy. Through donations and contributions of the Catholic Episcopal Conferences of Europe (COMECE), the Conference of European Churches (CEC), the Society of Jesus, the King Baudouin Foundation and numerous other institutions, the chapel was completely renovated and restructured in 1999–2000. On 25 September 2001, Archbishop Godfried Cardinal Daneels officially inaugurated the new church.

== Architecture ==
=== Interior ===
While the chapel's neo-Renaissance façade and its exterior remained unchanged, the interior was completely restructured and designed by Marionex Architects, Brussels. Today's building has four storeys, with visitors entering the chapel through a foyer (ground floor), which is used as a meeting and exhibition space. The basement contains a crypt, reserved for silent prayer and worship. The gold-plated cross is a work of the sculptor Philippe Denis. The liturgical main room is now located on the first floor and is accessible by an interior staircase and a lift.

=== Windows and organ ===
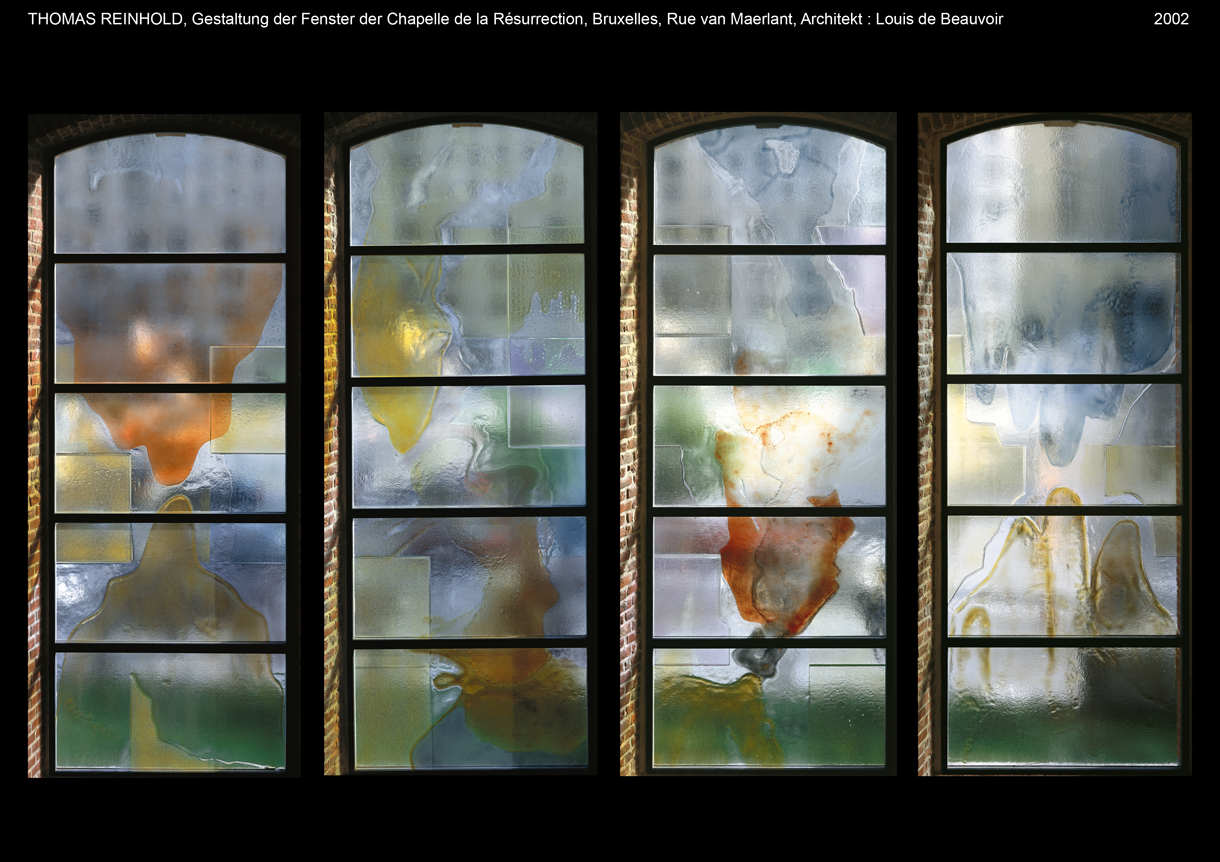
Four side windows by Thomas Reinhold

Since the church has lost its full original height, new windows by the Viennese artist Thomas Reinhold were inserted. The side windows show the themes of Creation, Incarnation, the Burning Bush and Pentecost, whereas the window of the main façade represents the Resurrection. They were produced by the factory of the Schlierbach convent in Upper Austria and financed by nine Austrian regions. On a side gallery, the chapel has an organ from the workshop Etienne Debaisieux, the instrument being a gift by the Evangelical Church in Germany (EKD). In the floor above, the building accommodates a meeting hall and office rooms (not visible from outside).

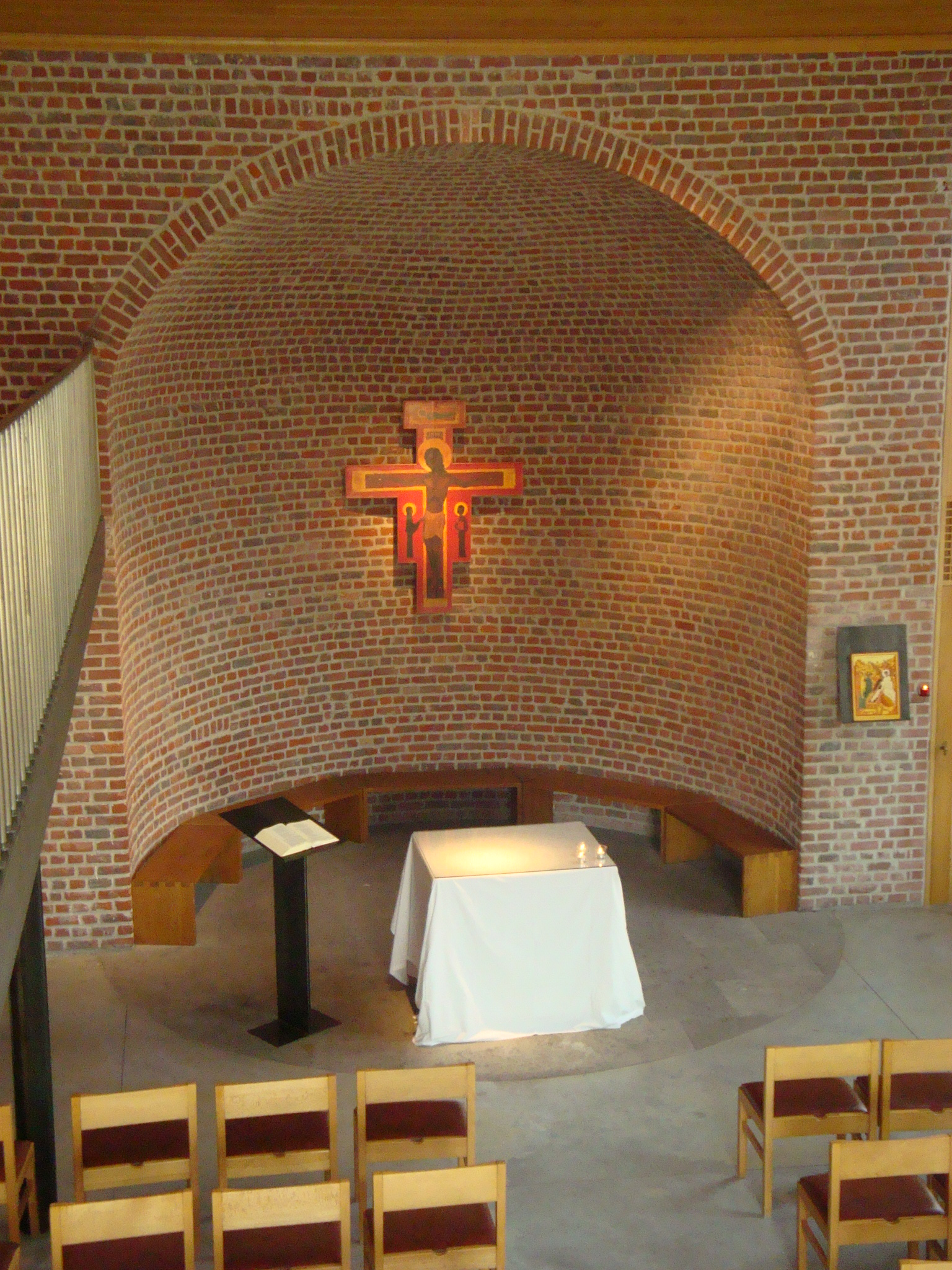
Interior

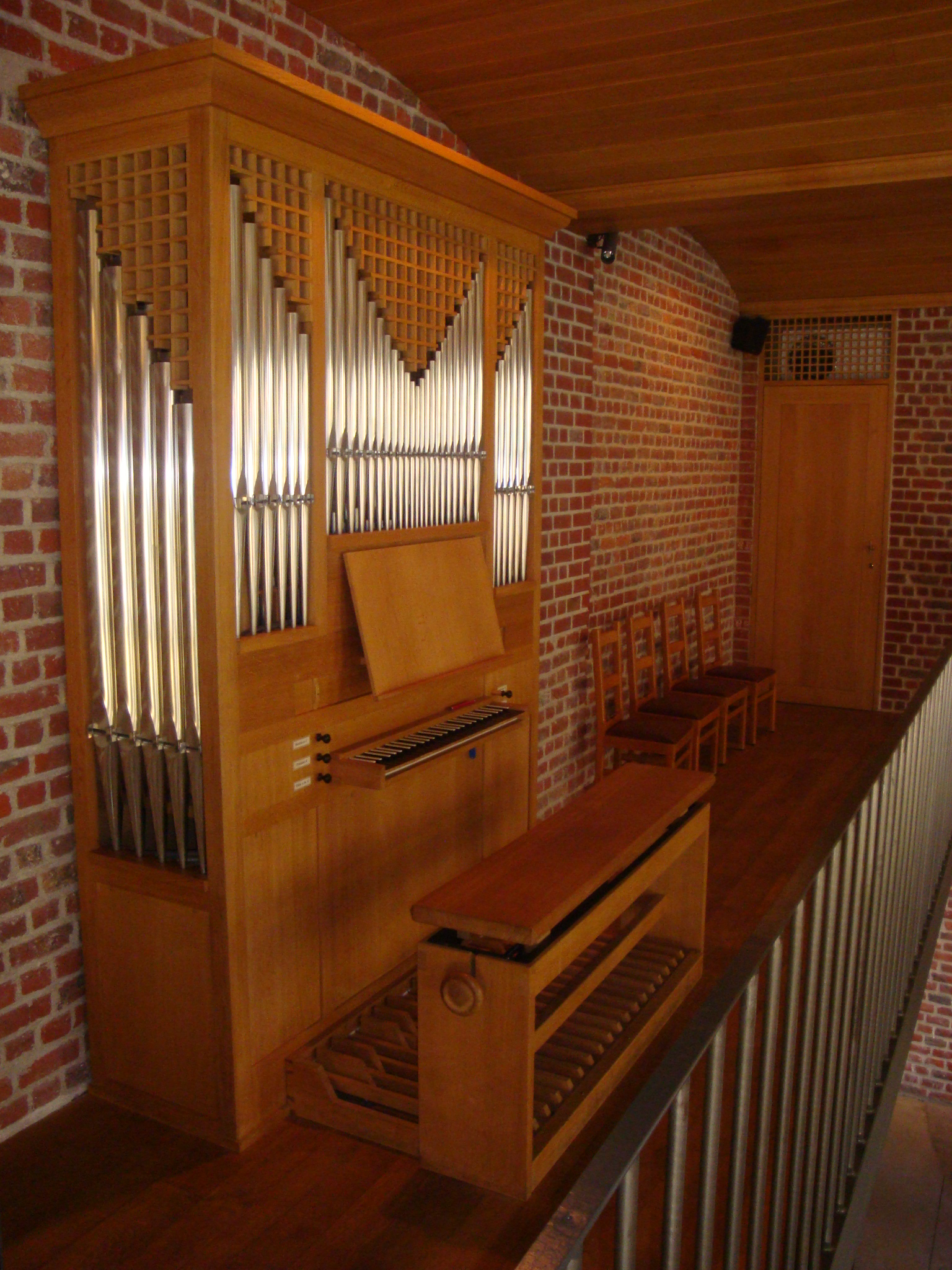
Organ

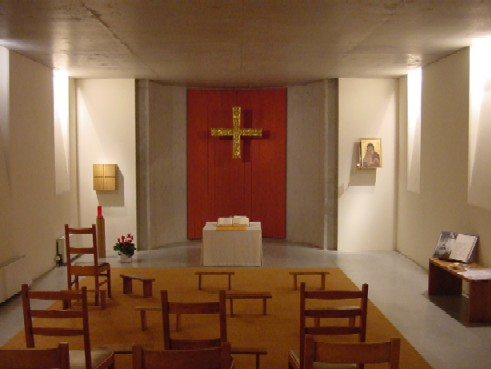
Crypt

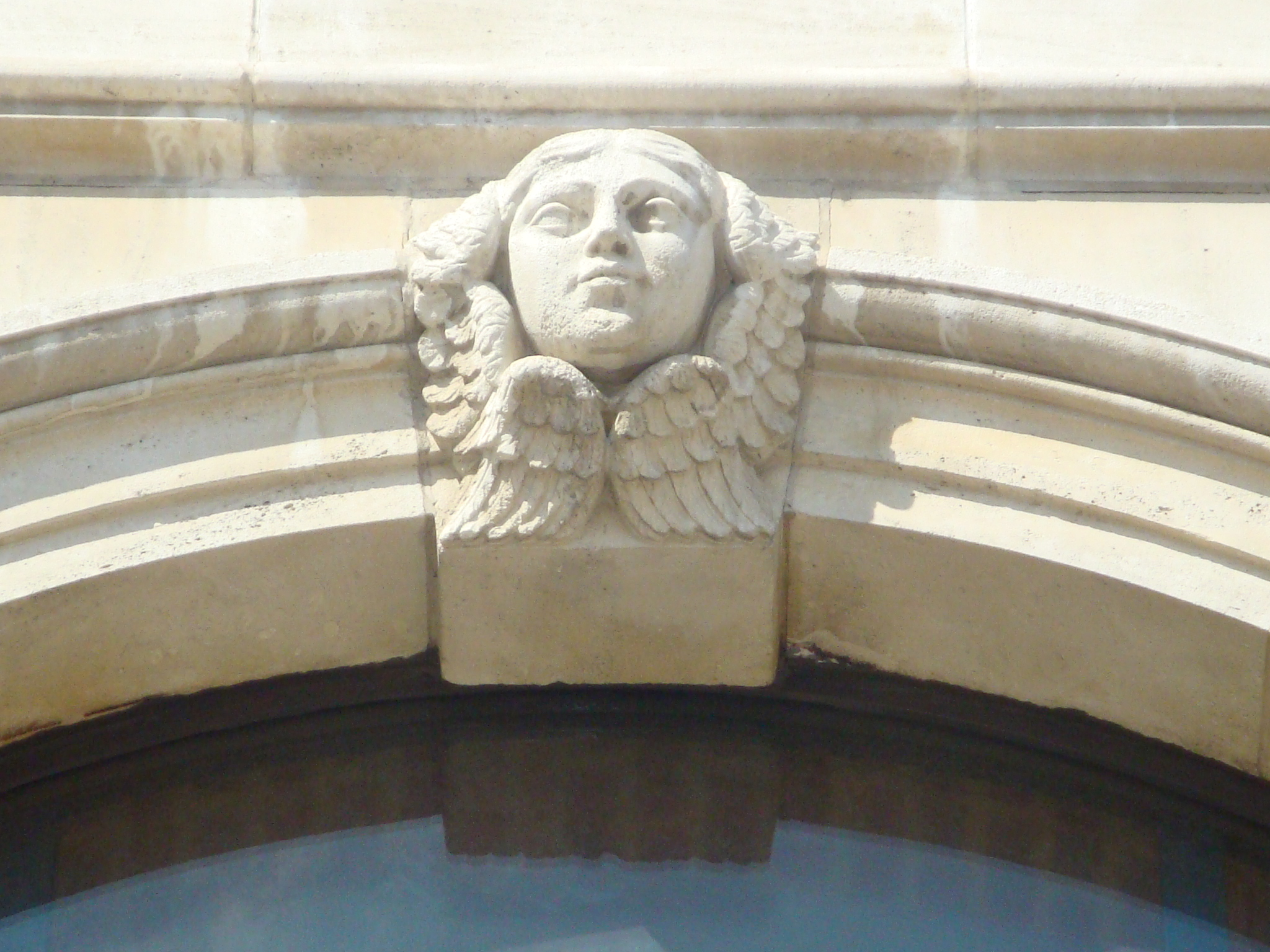
Façade detail

== Pastoral approach and current functions ==
The Chapel of the Resurrection is not a parish church. Due to its particular location in a business district and in close proximity to the EU institutions (Council of the European Union, European Parliament, European Commission, etc.), it serves as a place of discussion, meeting and prayer linked to these work-places. Therefore, the chapel is opened mostly on weekdays. It offers a wide range of liturgical events, taking in consideration the diversity of confessions, languages and nationalities of this mainly within a mostly "European" public. On the first and third Sundays of each month, a Finnish Lutheran communion service is held in the morning as part of the Finnish Seamen's Mission. A Catholic multilingual youth mass takes place every first and third Sunday of each month in the evening. Because of its proximity to the European Union's offices, the chapel is well used by EU civil servants and is used for weddings, baptisms, and memorial services. The chapel is conducted by a pastoral team of religious and lay volunteers. In addition to regular morning prayers (on weekdays), Catholic, Lutheran and Eastern Orthodox services are offered, usually at lunch time, in several languages, but mainly in English and French.

== See also ==
- List of churches in Brussels
- List of Jesuit sites in Belgium
- Catholic Church in Belgium
- History of Brussels
- Culture of Belgium
- Belgium in the long nineteenth century
