= European Commission Library =

Library service of the European Commission

- Bibliothèque de la Commission européenne (French); Zentralbibliothek der Europäischen Kommission (German)
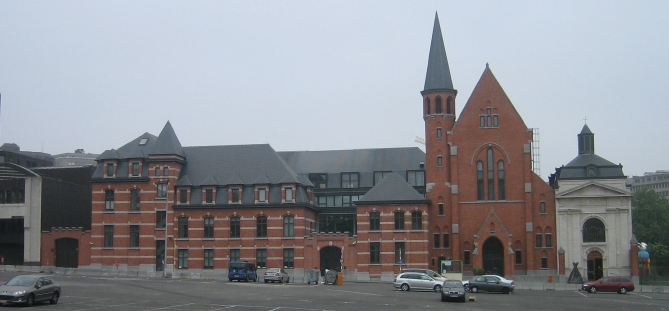
- The Convent Van Maerlant, home to the library
- 50.8412°N 4.3781°E
- Location: Rue Van Maerlant 18, Belgium
- Type: Special library (government)
- Established: 1958; 68 years ago
- Branches: 1 (Rue Alphonse Weicker 5, Luxembourg)

Collection
- Items collected: Books, official publications, periodicals, journal articles, e-books, databases
- Size: c. 500,000 works
- Criteria for collection: European integration, EU policies and law, official publications of the EU and its predecessors

Access and use
- Access requirements: Open to staff of the EU institutions; external researchers by appointment
- Population served: Staff of the European Commission and other EU institutions; researchers and students

Other information
- Head of Unit: Carol Riccalton
- Parent organisation: Publications Office of the European Union; European Commission
- Website: ec.europa.eu/libraries/

The European Commission Library (EC Library), formerly known as the Central Library of the European Commission, is the specialised library service of the European Commission, the executive branch of the European Union. It maintains reading rooms in Brussels, Belgium, and Luxembourg, and has been managed by the Publications Office of the European Union since 1 January 2021.

The library's stated mission is to supply current and authoritative information in support of evidence-based policymaking by the College of Commissioners and commission staff, while curating a historical collection documenting the European integration project that is open to outside researchers. Its collections are built on the holdings of the High Authority of the European Coal and Steel Community (ECSC), the European Atomic Energy Community (Euratom) and the European Economic Community (EEC).

== History ==
=== Origins ===
The library was established in 1958, following the entry into force of the Treaties of Rome and the creation of the EEC and Euratom Commissions. Some sources date its foundation to 1957, when the two communities were established. With the 1967 Merger Treaty, which united the executives of the ECSC, Euratom and the EEC into a single commission, the documentary holdings of the former executives were absorbed into the library's collections.

Historically the service was known as the Central Library and coordinated a network of departmental libraries and documentation centres attached to the commission's directorates-general.

=== Buildings ===
In Brussels, the library occupies the former Convent Van Maerlant at Rue Van Maerlant 18, in the city's European Quarter. The Neo-Gothic convent complex, vacated by its religious community in the late twentieth century, was converted for use by the commission; the adjoining chapel was separately restored and reopened in 2001 as the Chapel of the Resurrection. The Luxembourg site is housed in the Joseph Bech building on Rue Alphonse Weicker, in the Kirchberg quarter.

=== Transfer to the Publications Office ===
On 1 January 2021 the Commission library and its resources were transferred from the Directorate-General for Education, Youth, Sport and Culture (DG EAC) to the Publications Office of the European Union, without interruption of service. The transfer was intended to complement the Publications Office's existing services for identifying, acquiring, preserving and providing access to knowledge for the EU institutions and was carried out in four planned phases over the course of the year.

== Collections ==
The library collects material on European integration, the policy objectives and activities of the EU institutions, the member states and specialist subjects falling within the Union's remit. Holdings include:

- official publications of the EU and its predecessor communities;
- publications of intergovernmental organisations;
- commercial, academic and government publications;
- selected periodical articles and a substantial body of licensed electronic resources.

Estimates of the size of the print collection have put it at roughly 500,000 works, with material in the official languages of the Union. Access to subscribed electronic journals and databases is restricted under licence to commission staff, although visitors may consult a substantial part of the electronic collections on site where licences permit.

== Catalogues ==
=== ECLAS ===
The catalogues of the Central Library were computerised in 1978, giving rise to ECLAS (European Commission Libraries Automated System), the union catalogue of the commission's libraries, which was subsequently made freely available on the internet. ECLAS was withdrawn in December 2017 and superseded by Find-eR.

The library also developed the ECLAS thesaurus, a controlled vocabulary of nineteen subject areas arranged in a four-level hierarchy, used to index its acquisitions. It was originally based on the OECD Macrothesaurus and supplemented by the ILO thesaurus; after the creation of EuroVoc in 1984 an effort was made to align the two vocabularies, though the convergence was never completed. The thesaurus is available in English and French and is now maintained as a dormant dataset by the Publications Office on the EU Vocabularies website.

=== Find-eR ===
Find-eR is the library's current discovery service and online catalogue, built on the Ex Libris Primo platform. It covers both the print and electronic collections and offers broader coverage than ECLAS, indexing European policy documents from across the EU institutions, official publications of a number of international organisations and full-text journal articles and e-books where a subscription exists.

== Services and access ==
The reading rooms in Brussels and Luxembourg are open to staff of the European Commission and other EU institutions and bodies, and, by appointment, to external visitors specialising in EU affairs, including university students, academic staff and civil servants from the member states. Non-commission visitors may consult the physical collections on site and access electronic resources where licences allow; material may also be requested through interlibrary loan via the visitor's own institution.

The library publishes the EC Library Guides, a portal of subject guides assembling curated selections of information sources on EU policies, policymaking, country knowledge and European integration. The guides are publicly accessible and are also used by students, researchers and the general public.

In 2021, the first year under the Publications Office, the library's electronic collections recorded 72,926 article downloads and 74,680 e-book consultations.

== Cooperation ==
The library is a member of Eurolib, the European Community and Associated Institutions Library Cooperative Group, a co-operation network of the libraries of the EU institutions and agencies established in 1988 on the initiative of the secretary-general of the European Parliament. Eurolib supports inter-library document supply, the exchange of cataloguing data, joint investment in technology and acquisitions and professional exchange among member libraries.

The library is distinct from the commission's Historical Archives Service, which holds the archival records of the commission and its predecessor institutions and from the network of European Documentation Centres hosted by universities across the member states.

== See also ==
- Publications Office of the European Union
- EUR-Lex
- EuroVoc
- European Documentation Centre
- Historical Archives of the European Union
- Convent Van Maerlant
