= Altar society =

Cleaning ceremonial objects used in worship

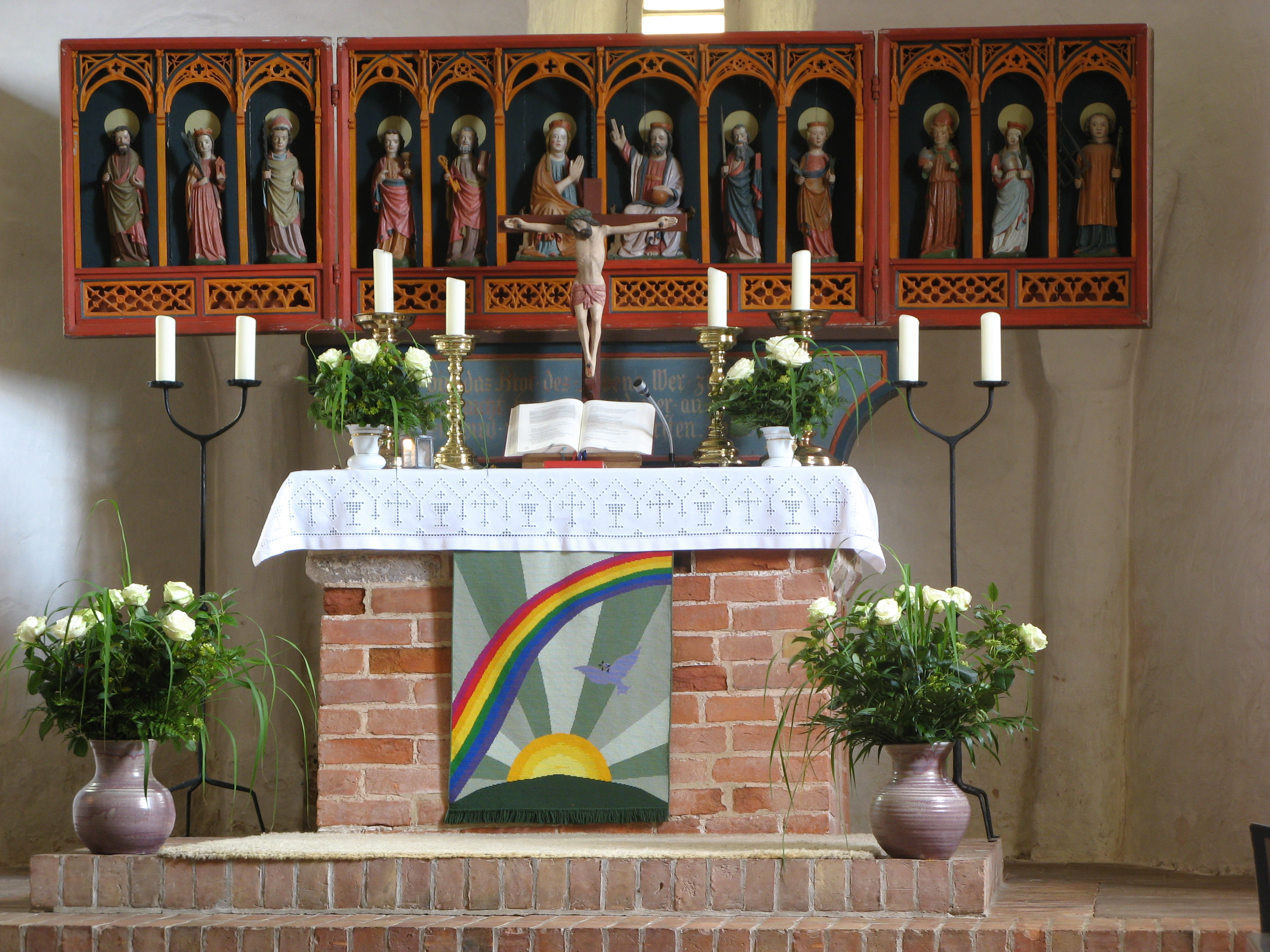
The altar guild is tasked with changing the paraments in the chancel based on the season of the liturgical year. Pictured is the altar of the Evangelical-Lutheran Church of St. Laurentii in Itzehoe, Germany (with the green parament signifying the season of Ordinary Time).

An altar society or altar guild is a group of laypersons in a parish church who maintain the ceremonial objects used in worship. Traditionally, membership was limited to women and their most common functions are making floral arrangements for the sanctuary, caring for linens, and holding fundraisers to purchase items for the sanctuary, including vestments and altar vessels.

Once the major volunteer organization for women in almost every parish, the number of parish altar societies has declined because of an increase in the number of other lay ministries, coupled with the rise of women working outside the home. Today, especially in the United States, membership may include both men and women and functions in a similar manner as before, oftentimes with less emphasis on fundraising.

The duties of members vary according to circumstances, in some instances including those which ordinarily fall within the sacristan's province, such as the vestments and altar vessels and making ready for the Mass. Some altar societies have expanded their scope of service to include charitable activities such as sending cards or telephoning homebound parishioners, or visiting nursing homes.

Members would either organise a fund for the maintenance and repair of church vessels or work to maintain the vessels. Altar societies differ from tabernacle societies in that altar societies work for the benefit of the church to which they are attached and tabernacle societies work for the benefit of many different poor churches.
