= Dieterich Spahn =

German painter

Dieterich Spahn (October 29, 1938 – November 2, 2021) was a German-born American artist working in the fields of stained glass and painting. In a career spanning more than four decades he produced roughly 370 stained glass commissions for places of worship, hospitals, universities, and private residences throughout the United States. In addition to stained glass, Spahn explored new media and techniques with his painting.

== Early life ==
Spahn was born in Cologne in 1938. With the outbreak of World War II his family moved to a farm in Sergen, near Cottbus. After the war they moved again to Düsseldorf where Spahn studied the arts and worked with the renowned Düsseldorf artist Günther Uecker. In 1958 he created his first experimental glass panels. Between 1958 and 1960 he studied at the Werkkunstschule where he was exposed to the traditions of the Bauhaus and Johan Thorn Prikker. The following year he traveled extensively throughout southern France and Spain to study light in architecture. During this period he produced a number of watercolors and oil paintings which are now in private collections throughout Germany.

== Move to the United States ==
In 1961 Dieterich Spahn was invited by the German-born artist Peter Dohmen to work in his St. Paul studio. It was upon his arrival in America that he began intensive activities with stained glass, mosaic and murals for sacred arts applications. He assisted in the production of a number of noteworthy commissions, including the stained glass windows and mosaics for the university chapel at Valparaiso University in Indiana, which became the largest stained glass windows in the United States.

In 1965 he began independent work in graphic arts. Around this time, the death of his mother prompted him to return to Germany where he viewed many works by Georg Meistermann and Ludwig Schaffrath and reestablished contact with the Düsseldorf art scene. This renewed his interest in painting and over the next several years he produced a series of paintings. In 1969 he returned to Germany to study the works of Georg Meistermann in depth.

== Dieterich Spahn & Associates ==
Upon returning, Spahn entered into partnership with the New York artist Mel Geary to purchase Peter Dohmen Studios. This partnership saw the production of a number of large commissions, until Geary returned to New York in 1971. In this same year Dieterich Spahn & Associates, Inc. was formed, devoted exclusively to stained glass and mosaics for the sacred arts. Over the next decade Spahn worked with George Winterowd and the nationally recognized church architect Ed Sovik to produce 75 commissions around the country totaling more than 400 stained glass windows.

In 1977 Spahn traveled again to Düsseldorf following the unexpected death of his sister to be with his gravely ill father, who died within days of his arrival. Upon his return to Minneapolis he began a series of oil paintings which moved away from religious themes.

== Personal life ==
In 1980 he married Joanne Shafer. Around this time he also met Frank Kacmarcik, a monk at St. John's Abbey in Collegeville, Minnesota, and nationally recognized liturgical and architectural consultant. Spahn served as a guest lecturer at St. John's University about stained glass and sacred art in the contemporary church environment. He also became a member of the St. Paul Archdiocesan Worship Board for Arts and Environment, a position which he held until 1986. 1984 marked the birth of his first son, Kevin, followed by David in 1987 and Alan in 1989. During this time he created a series of paintings drawing inspiration from the childhood images created by his children.

In 1988 Spahn interrupted his painting for over two years to focus on several major projects in stained glass, including the library window for St. Thomas University. During this period he also traveled to Düsseldorf to view the art of Joseph Beuys. Beuys' work had a major, positive influence on Spahn's perception and understanding of all art.

In 1991 Dieterich Spahn participated in the Wendekreis exhibition in Düsseldorf. This prompted a major change in his painting style upon his return. The next decade saw the production of a series of paintings which departed from traditional techniques of representation, as well as a number of large stained glass projects and commissions for liturgical design and consulting.

In 1999 Spahn again changed his painting style by reevaluating the role of the materials used and began a series which he continues. This series of works reflects the changing role of art in the 21st century. In early 2004 he began a collaboration with Willet Hauser Architectural Glass, the largest stained glass studio in the United States, resulting in a large commission for the Chiara Center.

== Recent commissions ==
2009 - Stella Maris Chapel at St. John's University, Collegeville, MN
2009 - Excelsior United Methodist Church, Excelsior, MN
2008 - Chapel Window, Benedictine Health Center, New Brighton, MN
2008 - St. Mary's Catholic Church, Willmar, MN
2008 - Emmanuel Presbyterian Church, West Linn, OR
2007 - All Saints Catholic Church, Lakeville, MN
2007 - Marco Island Lutheran Church, Marco Island, FL
2006 - St. Francis Window, Chiara Center, Springfield, IL
2006 - St. Mary's Catholic Church, Willmar, MN
2005 - Chapel Window, Mercy Hospital, Coon Rapids, MN
2005 - St. Gertrude's Chapel, Benedictine Healthcare Facility, Minnetonka, MN
2004 - Corpus Christi Catholic Church, Roseville, MN
2003 - Minnetonka Lutheran Church, Minnetonka, MN
