= Historical Archives Service (European Commission) =

Archives service of the European Commission

- Location: Avenue de Tervueren 211, Brussels, Belgium
- Type: Government archive
- Established: 1983; 43 years ago
- Head of Unit: Jacek Pasternak
- Period covered: 1952-present
- Employees: c. 40

The Historical Archives Service (HAS) is the service of the European Commission responsible for managing the archives of the commission and of the executives that preceded it. It appraises, describes and preserves records of legal or historical value, makes those over thirty years old available to the public through an online search system and a reading room in Brussels and transfers original files to the Historical Archives of the European Union (HAEU) in Florence, which serves as their final depository.

Established in 1983, the service employs around forty staff and forms part of the commission's Office for Infrastructure and Logistics in Brussels (OIB).

== Legal basis ==
The archive services of the European institutions rest on Council Regulation (EEC, Euratom) No 354/83 of 1 February 1983 concerning the opening to the public of the historical archives of the European Economic Community and the European Atomic Energy Community, together with the parallel ECSC Decision No 359/83. The regulation requires each institution to establish historical archives and to open them to the public once the records are thirty years old and permits each institution to hold its historical archives wherever it considers most appropriate. Institutions must transfer records from their current archives to the historical archives no later than fifteen years after creation.

Regulation No 354/83 has been amended by Council Regulation (EC, Euratom) No 1700/2003 and by Council Regulation (EU) 2015/496; the latter made deposit at the European University Institute obligatory for the institutions concerned.

== History ==
The Historical Archives Service was established in 1983, following the adoption of Regulation No 354/83, with the purpose of communicating the commission's historical heritage as part of the common European cultural heritage.

In 1984 the European Parliament, the Council and the commission agreed to deposit their historical archives at the European University Institute (EUI) in Florence; a deposit contract between the European Communities, represented by the commission, and the EUI was signed on 17 December 1984. The resulting Historical Archives of the European Communities opened to researchers in 1986. The European Economic and Social Committee and the European Court of Auditors subsequently adhered to the terms of the deposit contract. The 2015 amendment to Regulation No 354/83 converted the voluntary arrangement into a legal obligation.

The service's reading room, formerly located elsewhere in Brussels, moved to Avenue de Tervueren in Woluwe-Saint-Pierre; it was closed to the public between 22 December 2025 and 15 January 2026 for the relocation.

== Functions ==
The service describes its tasks as collecting paper and digital documents drawn up or received by the commission that have legal or historical value; describing them and placing them in historical context; ensuring their retention and authenticity, including through a long-term digital retention infrastructure; and making them available through online tools, the reading room and searches carried out by archivists in response to internal and external enquiries.

Its archival workflow involves selecting files of historical, legal or administrative value for permanent retention; disposing of files that have reached the end of their retention period and lack historical value; declassifying documents where appropriate; conducting historical analysis of retained files to assist searching; ensuring long-term storage and the production of digital copies; and finally transferring the original files to the HAEU in Florence.

The service is described by the commission as a bridge between the institution and the research community, serving commission and institutional staff alongside national authorities, academics, journalists and lawyers.

== Holdings ==
=== Archival fonds ===
The holdings are organised into four principal fonds:

- High Authority of the European Coal and Steel Community (1952–1967) – records of the horizontal services (general secretariat, legal service), administrative and financial services and the specialised departments for coal, steel, energy, social policy and transport.
- Commission of the European Economic Community (1958–1967) – administrative and technical matters; trade relations with non-member countries, including the GATT Dillon Round and Kennedy Round; negotiations relating to the first enlargements; customs association with overseas countries and territories; and the development of the common policies.
- Commission of the European Atomic Energy Community (1958–1967) – promotion of research and dissemination of technical knowledge, common health and safety standards, investment in nuclear energy, safeguards on nuclear materials and nuclear cooperation agreements with third countries.
- European Commission (since 1967) – arranged by field of activity, covering accession negotiations, relations with non-member countries and the development and implementation of the common policies.

=== Document collections ===
Alongside the fonds, the service holds a number of distinct collections:

- Minutes of meetings of the ECSC High Authority (1953–1967), the EEC and Euratom Commissions (1958–1967), the European Commission (since 1967) and the Committee of Permanent Representatives (Coreper, 1958–1977).
- COM and SEC files produced by the Registry of the Executive Secretariat of the EEC Commission (1958–1967) and the General Secretariat of the Commission of the European Communities (1967–1986). Each file assembles the successive drafts and language versions of a text, allowing its drafting history to be reconstructed.
- Speeches delivered since 1952 by commission presidents, commissioners, officials, members of the European Parliament and others. Speeches from 1985 onwards are also available through the RAPID database.
- Annual General Reports on the activities of the ECSC, EEC, Euratom and the Communities and Union (to 2005), with their subject-specific annexes; the EU Bulletin; Commission organisational charts and the official directory; and studies commissioned by the commission and held by the service until 1 July 2012.

== Access ==
Under Regulation No 354/83, archives more than thirty years old are open to public access and may be consulted at the service, usually in microfiche form. Documents less than thirty years old may be released under Regulation (EC) No 1049/2001 on public access to documents, which is administered by the commission's secretariat-general.

Certain material remains closed: classified documents may be disclosed only once declassified and documents containing sensitive personal or commercial information remain inaccessible for as long as the relevant exceptions apply, under Articles 2 and 3 of Regulation No 1700/2003. Regulation No 354/83 does not apply to European Communities staff files or to documents containing information on the private or professional life of individuals.

Visits to the reading room are by appointment, with visitors registering through the commission's visitor pass system. Audiovisual material is not held by the service; it falls to the Directorate-General for Communication.

== Finding aids ==
The service maintains an internal database, ARCHIS, which supports both the physical management of the archives (storage location, loans) and their intellectual description. The subset of records over thirty years old and open to the public is published online through ARCHISplus, which allows searching by archival fonds, minutes of meetings and speeches. Paper inventories are available for the ECSC High Authority files.

== Relationship with the Historical Archives of the European Union ==
The Historical Archives Service is distinct from the Historical Archives of the European Union in Florence, although the two are closely linked. The Brussels service manages the commission's records, appraises them and provides access in Belgium; the HAEU, hosted by the European University Institute, is the final depository to which original files are transferred and where the archives of several EU institutions are consulted together, alongside private papers documenting European integration.

== See also ==
- Historical Archives of the European Union
- European Commission Library
