= Sacristan =

Officer charged with care of the sacristy, the church, and their contents

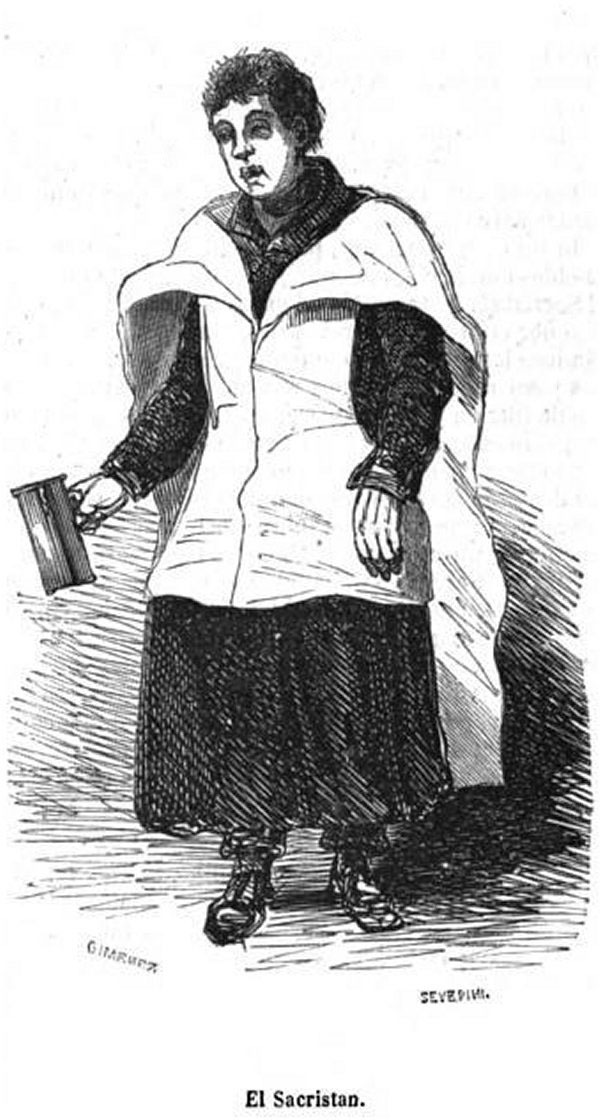
A sacristan

A sacristan is an officer charged with care of the sacristy, the church, and their contents.

In ancient times, many duties of the sacrist were performed by the doorkeepers (ostiarii), and later by the treasurers and mansionarii. The Decretals of Gregory IX speak of the sacristan as if he had an honourable office attached to a certain benefice, and say that his duty was to care for the sacred vessels, vestments, lights, etc. Nowadays the sacristan is elected or appointed. The Cæremoniale Episcoporum prescribed that in cathedral and collegiate churches the sacristan should be a priest, and describes his duties in regard to the sacristy, the Blessed Eucharist, the baptismal font, the holy oils, the sacred relics, the decoration of the church for the different seasons and feasts, the preparation of what is necessary for the various ceremonies, the pregustation in pontifical Mass, the ringing of the church bells, the preservation of order in the church, and the distribution of Masses; finally it suggests that one or two canons be appointed each year to supervise the work of the sacrist and his assistants.

In the Old Testament, the office and duties of the sacristan are assigned to the Levites. 1 Chronicles 23–26 describes how David assigned them duties such as temple doorkeepers, guardians, singers and musicians.

== Custos ==
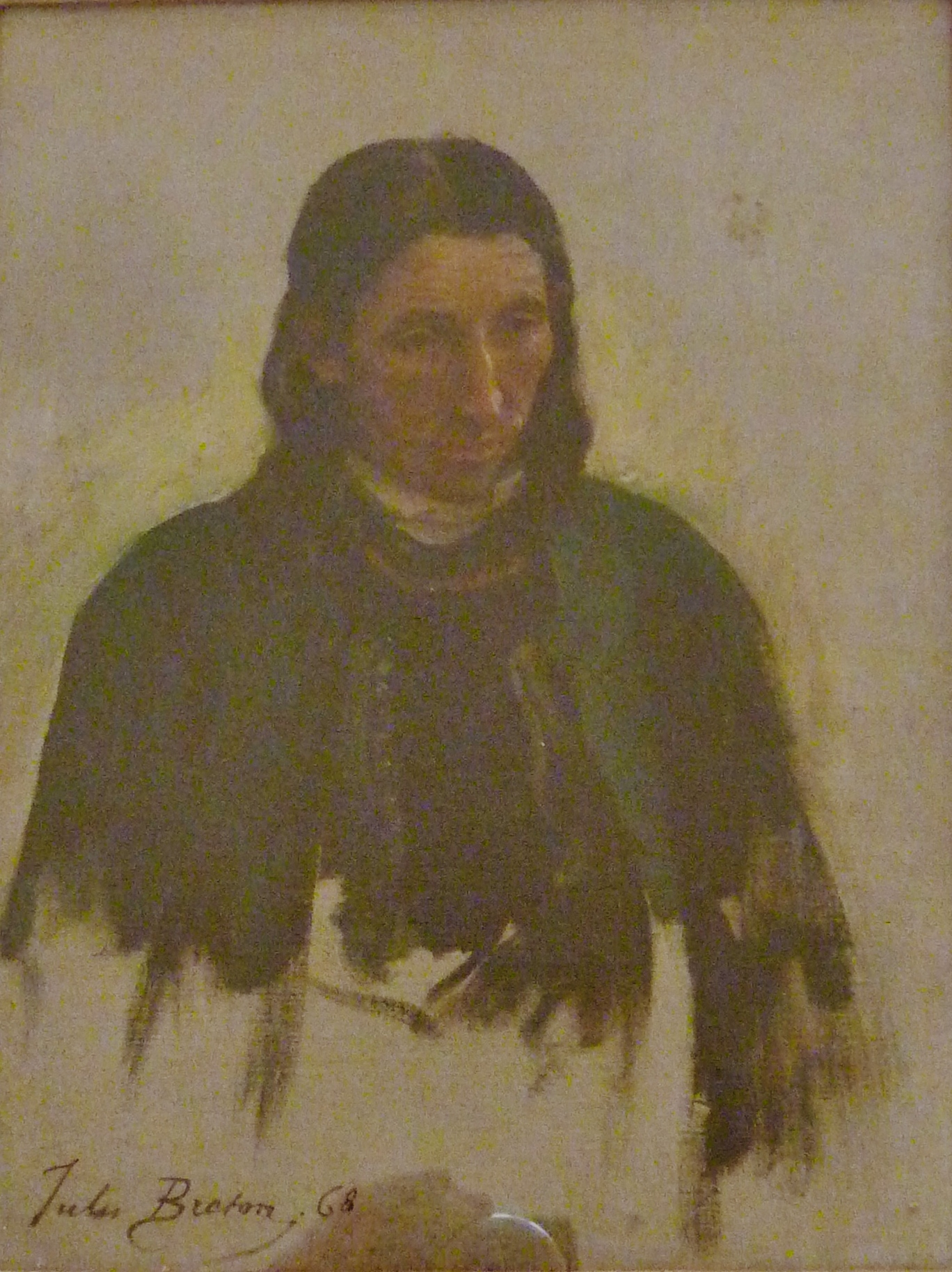
Le bedeau de Kerlaz, painting by Jules Breton (1868)

The under-sacristan is also mentioned in the Decretals. He was the assistant of the sacristan, was subject to the archdeacon and discharged duties very similar to those of the sacristan. By the early twentieth century, the office was hardly ever attached to a benefice and so usually a salaried position. The Council of Trent desired that according to the old canons, clerics should hold such offices; but in most churches, on account of the difficulty or impossibility of obtaining clerics, laymen perform many of the duties of the sacristan and under-sacristan.

In some European medieval contexts, a custos was given the more important roles of keeping the safety of the church, its relics, its treasure, and its archives, but was also responsible for the perception of capitationes, symbolic head-taxes that associated freemen with a religious institution.

== Altar societies ==
Altar societies were once commonly organised within most Catholic parish churches. Member duties vary according to circumstances, and in some instances include tasks that ordinarily fall within the sacristan's province, such as the vestments and altar vessels, making ready for the priest's Mass. In general, they consist of the payment of yearly dues into a fund for maintenance and repair of accessories used in Church ceremonies, and usually also include a certain amount of labour for this purpose. Altar societies differ from tabernacle societies in that they work for the benefit of the church they are attached to while tabernacle societies work for the benefit of many different poor churches.

== Eastern Churches ==
In the Eastern Churches, the sacristan is known as the ecclesiarch, particularly in monasteries. In large monasteries he may be assigned an assistant known as the paraecclesiarch. An analogous office is that of the skeuophylax. In parishes, however, the sacristan is called sexton. In addition to the tasks and responsibilities mentioned above, if an individual has a message for the priest while serving in the sanctuary, it is given to the sexton to give to the priest or deacon.

== Academia ==
Many Christian-faith schools appoint sacristans as members of their prefect bodies, particularly in public schools and institutions founded on the English model. For instance, the University of the South in Sewanee, Tennessee, an Episcopal university, hosts a student Sacristans Guild. Sacristans aid the school's chaplain in the day-to-day running of the chapel and promotion of a Christian ethos in the school. In terms of seniority, they are often regarded as second only to the school captains.

== See also ==
- Verger
