= Peter Dohmen =

Peter W. Dohmen
- Born: 28 May 1904; Körrenzig, now Linnich 50 km west of Cologne, Germany
- Died: May 1977 [Juelich], Germany
- Known for: Stained glass, mosaic, fresco, monumental art

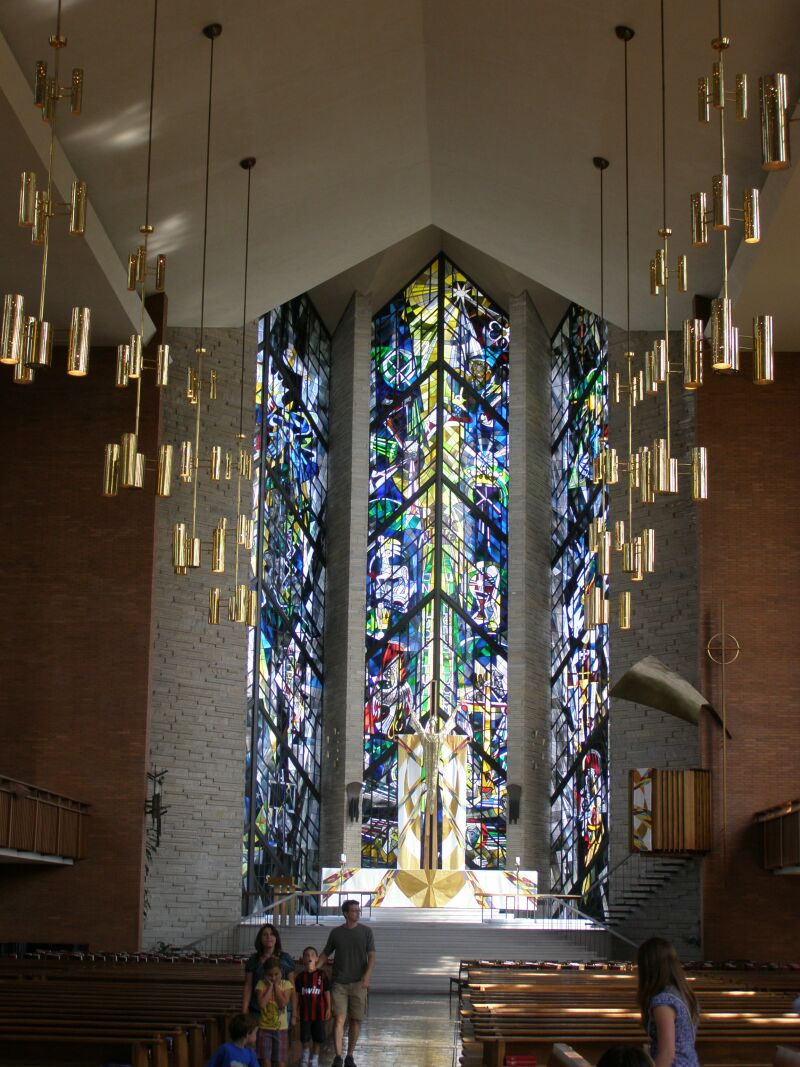
Munderloh Windows at the Chapel of the Resurrection, Valparaiso University, Indiana, designed by Peter Dohmen

Peter W. Dohmen (1904–1977) was a well-known and highly accomplished German liturgical artist who migrated to the United States with his family after the Second World War. In pre-war Germany, he had won numerous competitions for large frescoes, up to 10 stories high, and art works for public buildings. When he refused several times invitations to become a member of the Nazi party, which recruited accomplished people, he was put on the "black list" and no longer qualified for governmental contracts.

After the war, he decided to leave Germany for the USA, saying that Europe would always be at war. He and the family were on one of the first trains from Cologne to Hamburg, to the American Embassy to apply for immigration for the family. The visas were finally granted after a five-year wait.

== Education and early career ==
Dohmen was born on May 28, 1904, in Koerrenzig, now Linnich, about 50 km west of Cologne, Germany. At an early age, he showed his talent for art. As a young student he painted some beautiful, religious oil paintings with traditional religious themes. He was eager to learn more from the best art teachers in Europe and applied for scholarships to some of the leading art academies. His efforts paid off when he received a scholarship from the German government. He then attended some of the most prominent art academies of Europe, including Cologne, Düsseldorf, Aachen, and the Higher Institute of the Royal Art Academy in Antwerp, Belgium.

He studied under some of the most noteworthy and prominent professors of art at the time, such as Professor Johan Thorn Prikker, Dominikus Boehm and Baron Professor Isidore Obsomer, Director of the Royal Art Academy in Antwerp.

After completing his studies, Dohmen was briefly an art teacher at the Institute for Christian Art in Dortmund before becoming the manager of a highly regarded art studio in Austria, where he worked in fresco murals, mosaic murals and stained glass windows. In 1936, he returned to Germany to establish his own art studio in Cologne.

== Peter Dohmen Studios in Germany ==
Dohmen became well known as an artist in Germany during the 1930s for his monumental art works, including stained glass windows, large frescoes on major public buildings and Byzantine glass mosaics.

In 1937, he made an exciting, historic discovery in the dome of the Ursula Kirche, an ancient church in Cologne. He found that underneath the paint of the vaulted ceilings were beautiful religious paintings dating back to the 13th century. The Minister of Culture commissioned him to restore and save the very valuable frescoes.

Later, the government also commissioned him with the execution of historic fresco murals (3,000 sq. ft.) in the Knights Hall of a renaissance citadel in Juelich, Germany.

In 1938, he was offered a professorship at the State Art Academy in Koenigsberg, Germany. However, a few weeks before taking this position, a law was passed requiring that those teaching at a state school had to be members of the Nazi party. Given his dislike of the Nazis, he declined. He wanted to leave Germany, but the government had already made it difficult to leave and eventually impossible.

During the war, the Dohmen family lost their homes twice from Allied bombs. They and most Germans lived in their basements for months to be protected from the constant bombings, at night by the British, during the day by Americans. They had to flee several times with just the clothes they could carry in backpacks, to escape the battle front and once to escape the Nazis. He had helped four of his school friends, who were Jewish, to escape across the border out of Germany. Eventually he was blackballed by the government because of his outspoken opposition toward the Nazi party.

His studio in Cologne was destroyed by bombing during the war. He decided that once the war was over, he would leave Germany and go to America. After the war, as soon as the railroad started running again, he and the family took the train to the American Embassy in Hamburg to apply for an immigration visa. It took five years, and when the visa was granted, the family sold their house and furniture and migrated to the United States. German monetary restrictions allowed the family to only take the equivalence of $10 per person. A relative in Saint Paul, Minnesota, had sponsored the family. They arrived there during one of the harshest winters in years.

After turning down several employment offers from leading stained glass studios in the US, he established the Peter Dohmen Studios in Saint Paul. His more modern art style was just what young architects were looking for and had not been able to find. These architects did not want the very traditional church art, often referred to as "kitsch". His timing had been perfect and he soon started receiving contracts for some very prominent institutions.

== Peter Dohmen Studios in St. Paul ==
Among his major works are the mosaic murals at Carleton College in Minnesota, stained glass windows in the library of the University of Notre Dame and the windows in the Chapel of the Resurrection at Valparaiso University, Indiana.

Dohmen married the daughter of a well-known businessman in Cologne. They had two sons just before the war broke out. In the 1950s, he and his wife designed the stained glass windows in the United States and they were fabricated in some of the most reputable fabrication studios in Germany, using only the highest grade glass and materials, such as mouthblown antic glass. This glass gives the windows a crystal-like character. The windows were then shipped in sections to the US for installation.

Dohmen's works can be found in numerous churches in the states of Illinois, Indiana, Minnesota, Oklahoma, North- and South Dakota, Nebraska, Iowa and Wisconsin. He also did the breathtaking Byzantine glass mosaic columns in the Veterans Administration building in St. Paul, introducing art which had been used for thousands of years, and can be seen at the Vatican, St. Mark’s Basilica in Venice, and many of the extraordinary buildings of old Europe. Other Minnesota locations of Dohmen's stained glass art are Messiah Episcopal Church in Saint Paul, Pilgrim Lutheran Church in Minneapolis, Richfield United Methodist Church and Saint James Lutheran Church in West St. Paul.

He was often invited to display his works of art in art exhibitions in Europe and the US.

He retired in 1972 and died in May 1977 in the hospital in Koenigswinter, Germany. He left behind some works of arts for others to enjoy.

In 1961, Dieterich Spahn worked as his apprentice and assisted in the production of two of the Valparaiso windows. In 1971, after Dohmen decided to retire, Spahn and the New York artist Mel Geary bought the Peter Dohmen Studio. Spahn has carried on in the great tradition and has designed many outstanding stained glass windows in his own style over the past 40 years. His studio is in Minnetonka, Minnesota.

=== The Chapel of the Resurrection at Valparaiso University ===
Dohmen completed four large stained glass windows in the Chapel of the Resurrection, three chancel windows and a lone window in the western wall of the chapel. The chancel windows constituted the largest stained glass commission in the United States at the time of their installation, each measuring 85-feet-tall by 22-feet-wide. They are known as the Munderloh windows, after the donors, Mr. and Mrs. Alfred C. Munderloh of Detroit, Michigan. The window in the western wall was given by Mr. and Mrs. Richard E. Meier and is known as the Meier window.

The chapel project was completed in phases spanning over five years. The Meier window was dedicated on the same day as the chapel itself, September 27, 1959. The center Munderloh window was dedicated on February 5, 1961. The two flanking Munderloh windows were finally dedicated several years later, on January 10, 1965.

Dohmen worked closely with Dr. A. R. Kretzmann, the liturgical consultant of the Chapel of the Resurrection to create windows that are described by the university as "sermons in color".

==== The Munderloh Redemption Window ====
The center window, the Redemption Window, tells the stories of the New Testament. The first division of this window shows the rising sun of a new day in Christ. A Messianic Rose, along with symbols of the Lion of the tribe of Judah and the Stem of Jesse, all come together to describe the prophetic fulfillment that is Jesus Christ – the word made flesh. The divisions that follow this depict well-known stories of the New Testament, including Christmas, Maundy Thursday, Good Friday and Easter. The final divisions of the center window look forward to Christ's return to creation. The Book with Seven Seals along with trumpets sounding to the Four Corners of the earth are displayed here. This window is concluded with the Chi-Rho, a symbol for Christ and his eternal presence. Some text also appears interspersed with the images of the Redemption Window. In the center of the window, the mark "IC-XC-NIKA" appears. This early text, which translates as "Jesus Christ, the Conqueror" comes from an Ephesian tomb from the third century AD. Also appearing in the center of this window is the Latin "In Luce Tua, Videmus Lucem"' This text from the 36th Psalm is also the motto for Valparaiso University.

==== The Munderloh Creation Window ====
The window on the far right is the Creation Window. Like each of the Munderloh windows, this window is read clockwise, starting in the upper-right corner and continuing through each of the ten divisions of the window. The first division bears the marks of the planets, followed by the creating hands of God in the second division. The next divisions feature well-known Old Testament stories, from Adam and Eve, to the Ten Commandments and symbols of the ancient kings. This first window concludes with images of peace, most specifically with a dove, which soars more than 80 feet above the chancel.

==== The Munderloh Sanctification Window ====
The third Munderloh Window is the Sanctification Window. The initial divisions of this window show symbols of the early church: scrolls (the Holy Scripture) and a dove (Pentecost) are among these symbols. The next division includes images of Christian martyrdom and moves into images of contemporary Christian life. Music, nations, scientific advances and world mission all appear in the images of this window. The elements of the Eucharist along with other symbols of priestly office also are present here. This final window concludes with Luther's coat of arms and the torch of the university. Both of these symbols are excellent symbols of Valparaiso University.

==== The Meier Window ====
The Meier Window is designed to present "music and its place in the life of the Christian". The art of this window depicts both the light-hearted and austere nature of art, specifically music, in a Christian life. Many instruments also find their way into the window, the entire work set against, "a striking red motif, the symbol of Christ’s saving redemption and of our personal salvation". The Meier Window contains 3,400 pieces of stained glass.

== Tragedy and return to Europe ==
The Dohmens' lives were upended by the tragic death of their 27-year-old son, Volker H. Dohmen, on May 19, 1964, in Long Beach, California, where he had represented the family firm on the West Coast, PETER DOHMEN STUDIOS. Two men in casual clothes burst into his apartment in the middle of the night with guns blazing. They were plainclothed cops and had acted on false information. Volker died of multiple bullet wounds....Volker was very intelligent, a businessman loved by clients such as prominent architects. He had been a 2-time state chess champion, captain and leading scorer of the Macalester College soccer team, as well as the local Minneapolis Kickers....His parents donated a valuable, large brass and mosaic cross to the Long Beach Memorial Hospital in his honor....The parents published the story of the shooting in an LA-area newspaper, addressed to the people of Long Beach, to make public the coverup of the killing by employees of the City. In 1970, the Dohmens, citing deep bitterness with the American justice system that did not punish the killers, returned to Germany.
