= Thomas Reinhold (artist) =

Austrian painter

Thomas Reinhold (born in 1953, Vienna, Austria) is an Austrian painter, one of the initiators of so-called “New Painting” (in German Junge Wilde).

== Life ==
From 1974 to 1978, Reinhold studied at the University of Applied Arts Vienna under Herbert Tasquil. During his university studies, Reinhold concentrated on poetic-magical paintings and photographs, dealing with the objecthood of the image. In the late 1970s, Reinhold was one of the initiators of so-called “New Painting” (in German Junge Wilde) together with Siegfried Anzinger, Erwin Bohatsch, Alfred Klinkan and Hubert Schmalix. In the mid-1980s, Reinhold has begun to focus on issues of medium reflexivity of painting and photography, which has been dominating his work until today. Reinhold lives in Vienna.

== Work ==
Painting

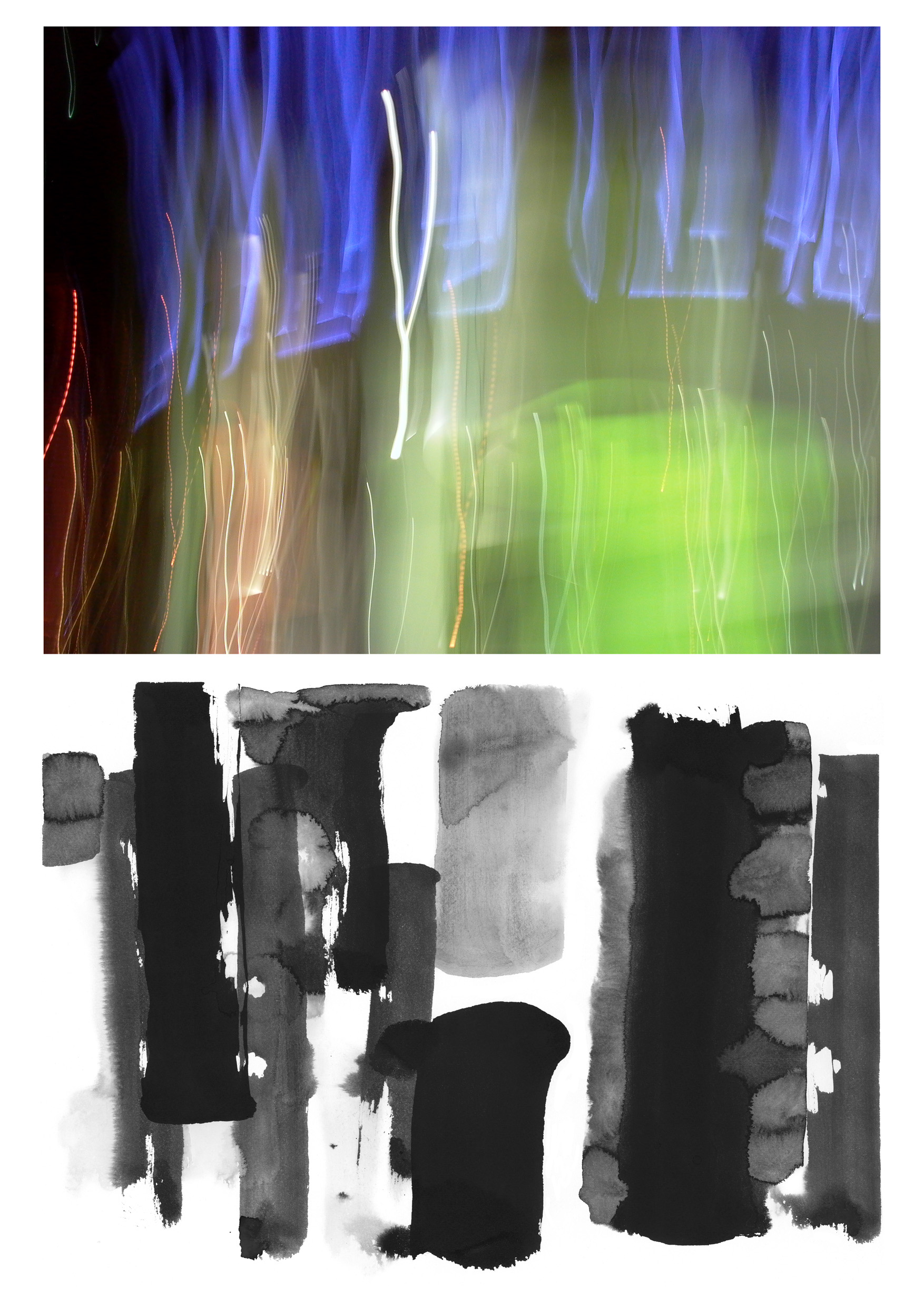
From the photo series “Brushstrokes of Light, living Shades”, 2010

Reinhold’s large-scale oil paintings address such issues as medium reflexivity, the material dimension of paint, or the canvas plane and its relation to space. The paintings deal with questions of their own creation and their relation to time by showing overlapping layers of colour. Because of this, the beholder needs to see the paintings in an almost archaeological way to explore the pictorial space. In 2011, Reinhold worked on the series “Tectonics of Poise“. The subject of this group of works reflects on their own creation. Liquid paint coalesces around a dead centre, permitting – for a few moments – a process of ordered decision making. The painting procedure, in which the allocation of the centre of gravity is such an essential element, actually provokes this fleeting state where indeterminacy gives way to form. It is this point of transition that attracts attention and produces shapes seemingly suspended between rivulets.

Photography

Since the beginning of his career, Reinhold has been interested in photography. In his 1977 “Ferris wheel series” he addresses issues of space, time and chronology. The series’ central motif, the “Wiener Riesenrad” (Viennese Ferris wheel) stands for questions of mobility and immobility, object and its image. In 2010, Reinhold lived in Shanghai for three months, where worked on the series “Brushstrokes of Light, Living Shades”. The photographs for this series were taken by night, and the resulting images recall the superimposition techniques employed in Reinhold‘s paintings. The paintings in the series are ink paintings made with a Chinese calligraphy brush, which remind the beholder of the early days of photography. Both the motifs and the technique are linked to the city Shanghai.

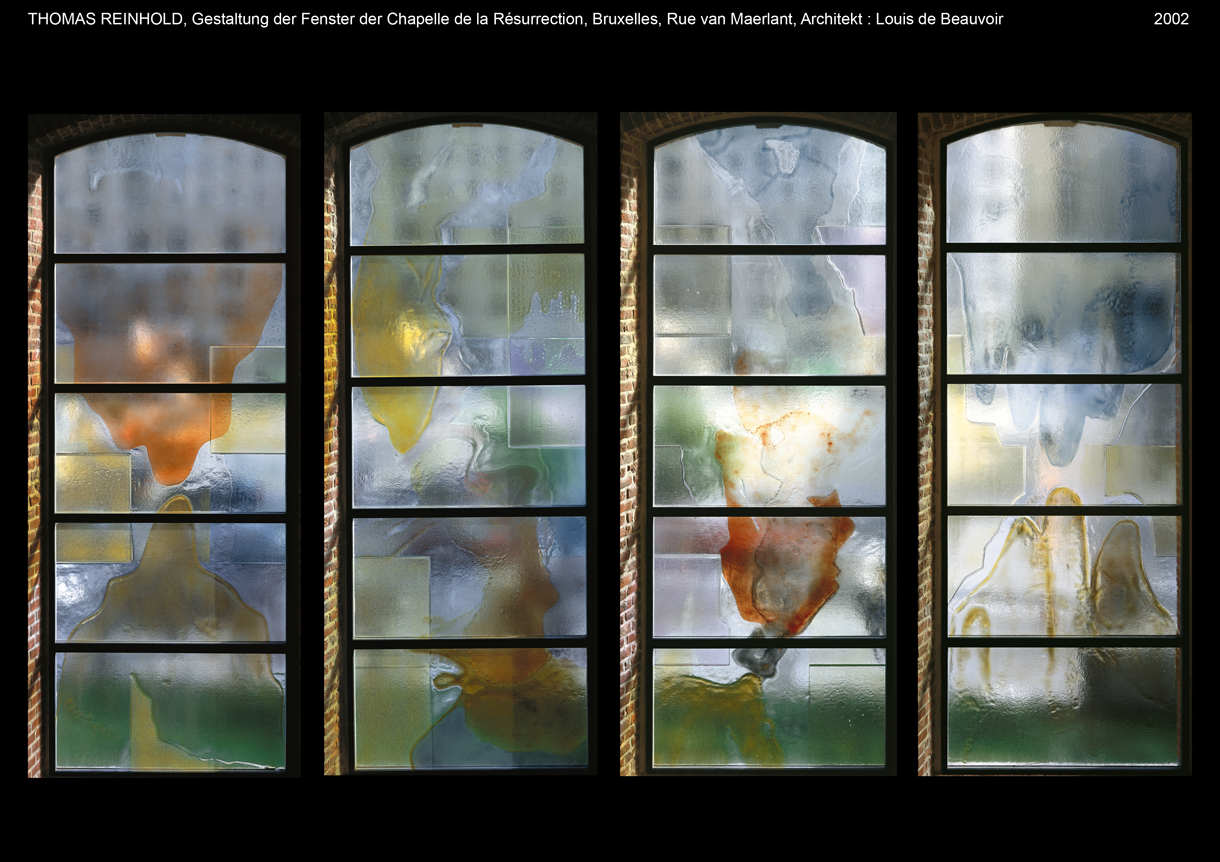
Four side windows of the Chapel of the Resurrection, 2002

Public Work

In 1999, Reinhold got the assignment of designing the windows of the Chapel of the Resurrection, Rue van Maerlant in Brussels, which he completed in 2002 in cooperation with the glass painting manufactory Schlierbach, Austria. As a result of the fusion technique used in the windows' production, their transparency provides a 'display model' of visual depth, the superimposition of different layers, and the relationship between coexistence and sequence. This allows the viewer to reflect on his or her own position. Looking out, the transitional coloured layer merges with the facades of the European government buildings opposite, while trees, an expanse of lawn, passing cars and people contribute their shapes and colours to a background layer of reality and add to the view as a whole.

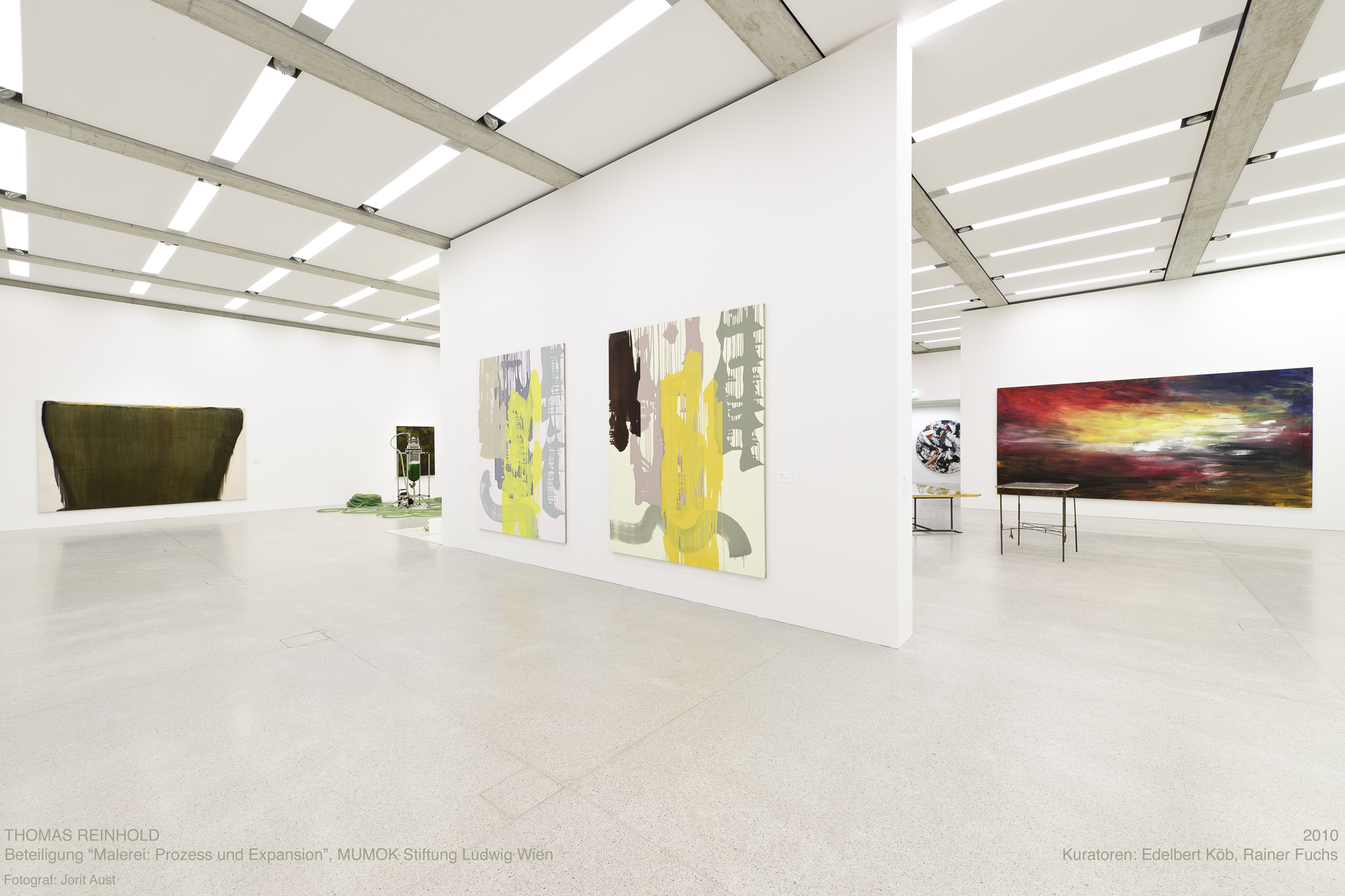
Exhibition "Painting: Process and Expansion", MUMOK, Vienna 2010

== Recognition ==
2011: Award for Fine Arts, City of Vienna

== Exhibitions ==
Selected individual exhibitions

- 2012: "Tectonics of Poise", kunsthaus muerz, Mürzzuschlag, Austria; Gallery Kunst und Handel, Graz, Austria
- 2011: Gallery Gölles Fürstenfeld, Austria
- 2009: „Wesentlich“, Gallery Michitsch Vienna, Austria
- 2008: „repro-spektiv:re-produktiv, aus dem vollen geschöpft“, Gallery Kunst & Handel, Graz, Austria
- 2006: „From the Nature to an Architecture of Painting“, HF Contemporary Art, London, United Kingdom
- 2005: „synergie:paradox“, cooperation with Julie Hayward, Museum of Modern Art, Admont Abbey, Austria
- 1997: "Malweise“, Vienna Secession Vienna, Austria
- 1995: "Polyptychon“, Kunsthaus Galerie, Mürzzuschlag, Austria
- 1988: Valente, arte contemporanea, Finale Ligure, Italy
- 1987: Gallery Springer Berlin, Germany - „Stand und Gegenstand“, Skulpturen, Vienna Secession Vienna, Austria
- 1984: Gallery Heike Curtze, Vienna, Austria and Düsseldorf, Germany
- 1983: Gallery Ariadne, Vienna, Austria
- 1980: Forum Stadtpark, Graz, Austria

Selected group exhibitions

- 2026: fokus sammlung 08. ABSTRAKT. material+struktur, MMKK, Museum of Modern Art Carinthia, Austria
- 2012: The Sigrid and Franz Wojda Collection, MMKK, Museum of Modern Art Carinthia, Austria
- 2011: "Realität und Abstraktion", Museum Liaunig Neuhaus, Austria
- 2010: “Painting: Process and Expansion”, MUMOK Foundation Ludwig Vienna, Austria, curators: Rainer Fuchs, Edelbert Köb
- 2007: “Konzeptuelle Fotografie aus Sammlungsbesitz”, Museum of Modern Art Rupertinum, Salzburg, Austria, curator: Margit Zuckriegl
- 2006: „Crossover“, Koroska Galerija Slovenj Gradec, Slowenia, curator: Silvie Aigner
- 2004: „Vision einer Sammlung“, Museum of Modern Art Rupertinum, Salzburg, Austria, curator: Agnes Husslein Arco
- 1998: „KUNST mit durch über SCHRIFT", Internationale Kunst der letzten fünfzig Jahre aus der Sammlung Kübler, Atterseehalle, Attersee, Austria, curator: Margit Zuckriegl - „Contemporary Austrian Painters“, The Rotunda, One Exchange Square, Hong Kong, China, curator: Christiane Inmann
- 1997: „Positionen österreichischer Malerei heute“, Centre Cultural Sala Parpallo Valencia, Spain, curator: Lóránd Hegyi
- 1994: „Wilde und neuwilde österreichische Bildkunst aus dem Besitz der Salzburger Landessammlung Rupertinum", Salzburg, Austria, curator: Otto Breicha
- 1993: „Konfrontationen“, Neuerwerbungen, MUMOK Foundation Ludwig Vienna, Austria
- 1992: „Surface radicale“, Grand Palais Paris, France, Los Angeles Convention Center, USA, University of Applied Arts Vienna, Austria, curator: Lóránd Hegyi
- 1991: „Kunst, Europa 1991“, Kunstverein in Hamburg, Deichtorhallen, Germany, and Gallery Rähnitzgasse Dresden, Germany, curator: Jürgen Schweinebraden
- 1990: „Querdurch“, Dom umenia, Bratislava, Slovakia, curator: Edelbert Köb
- 1988: „MALERMACHT, Expression und Pathos in der neuen Österreichischen Malerei“, Künstlerhaus Palais Thurn und Taxis Bregenz, Austria, curator: Christa Häusler
- 1985: „Austria ferix", Palazzo Costanzi, Galleria Torbandena Triest, Italy, Gallery Goethe Bolzano, South Tyrol
- 1984: „artisti austriaci, due generazioni“, studio cavalieri Bologna, Italy - 6th International Small Sculpture Exhibition, Kunsthalle Budapest, Hungary, curator: Edelbert Köb
- 1983: „Neue Malerei in Österreich“, Gallery Jurka Amsterdam, Netherlands - „Joves Salvatges“ Austriacs, Gallery Dau al Set Barcelona, Spain - „Neue Malerei in Österreich ’83“, New Gallery - City of Linz; Austria, curator: Peter Baum
- 1981: „Neue Malerei in Österreich“, Neue Gallery Graz, curator: Wilfried Skreiner - 5. Internationale Biennale, Vienna Secession, Austria
- 1980: „Das Sofortbild, Entdeckung eines Mediums“, Rheinisches Landesmuseum Bonn, Germany

== Works in collections ==
- Albertina, Vienna
- Österreichische Galerie Belvedere, Vienna
- Collection FOTOGRAFIS, Vienna, currently on permanent loan in the Museum of Modern Art, Rupertinum, Salzburg, Austria
- Foundation Ludwig Vienna, Austria
- Landesmuseum Niederösterreich, St. Pölten, Austria
- Lentos Kunstmuseum, Linz, Austria
- Museum für Gegenwartskunst Admont Abbey, Styria, Austria
- MMKK Museum of Modern Art Carinthia, Austria
- Museum of Modern Art Salzburg, Austria
- Museum Sztuki, Lodz, Poland
- State Museum of Tyrol, Innsbruck, Austria

Private collections

- Collection Carl Djerassi, Vienna, Austria
- Museum Liaunig, Neuhaus, Austria
- The Sigrid and Franz Wojda Collection, Vienna, Austria
