= Christ Church Lutheran (Minneapolis, Minnesota) =

Historic Lutheran church in Minnesota, US

- U.S. National Register of Historic Places
- U.S. National Historic Landmark
- Minneapolis Landmark
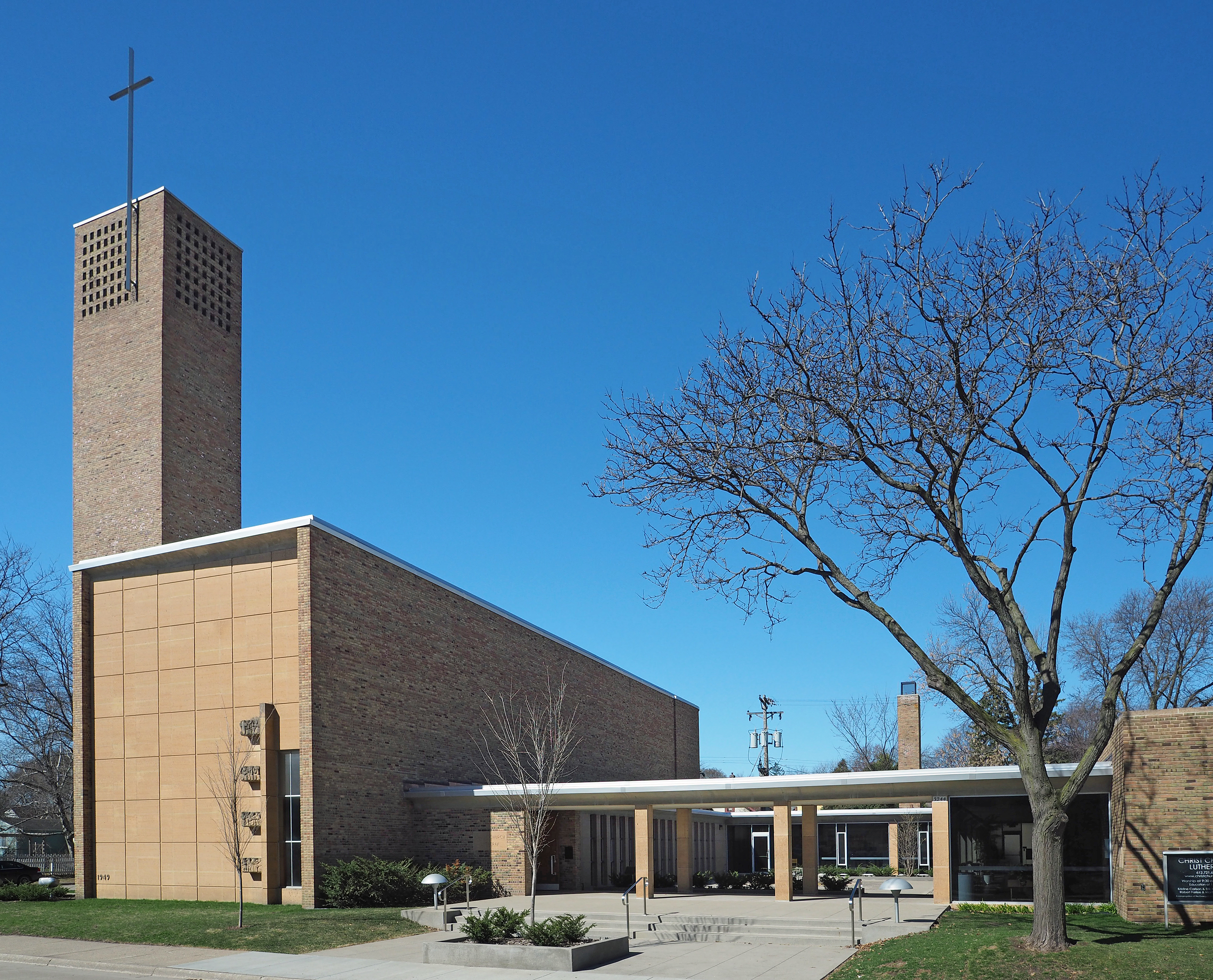
- Christ Church Lutheran viewed from the northeast
- Location: 3244 34th Avenue South, Minneapolis, Minnesota, U.S.
- Coordinates: 44°56′37″N 93°13′24″W
- Built: 1948–1949
- Built by: Kraus-Anderson, Inc.
- Architect: Eliel Saarinen
- Architectural style: International Style
- NRHP reference No.: 01000654

Significant dates
- Added to NRHP: June 20, 2001
- Designated NHL: January 16, 2009
- Designated MPLSL: 1978

Christ Church Lutheran is a congregation of the Evangelical Lutheran Church in America (ELCA) in Minneapolis, Minnesota, United States. Its building—consisting of a sanctuary with chapel (1949) and an education wing (1962), both designed by Finnish-American architects Eliel Saarinen and Eero Saarinen—has been internationally recognized and were declared a National Historic Landmark in 2009.

The congregation was established in 1911 as part of the Lutheran Church – Missouri Synod, but left in the 1970s as part of a dispute that led to the formation of the Association of Evangelical Lutheran Churches, which in turn was among the founding denominations of the ELCA.

Miriam Samuelson-Roberts currently serves as lead pastor, and Erik Haaland is associate pastor. The congregation is also served by its cantors, Deacon Mark Sedio and Martha Mutch.

== Structures ==
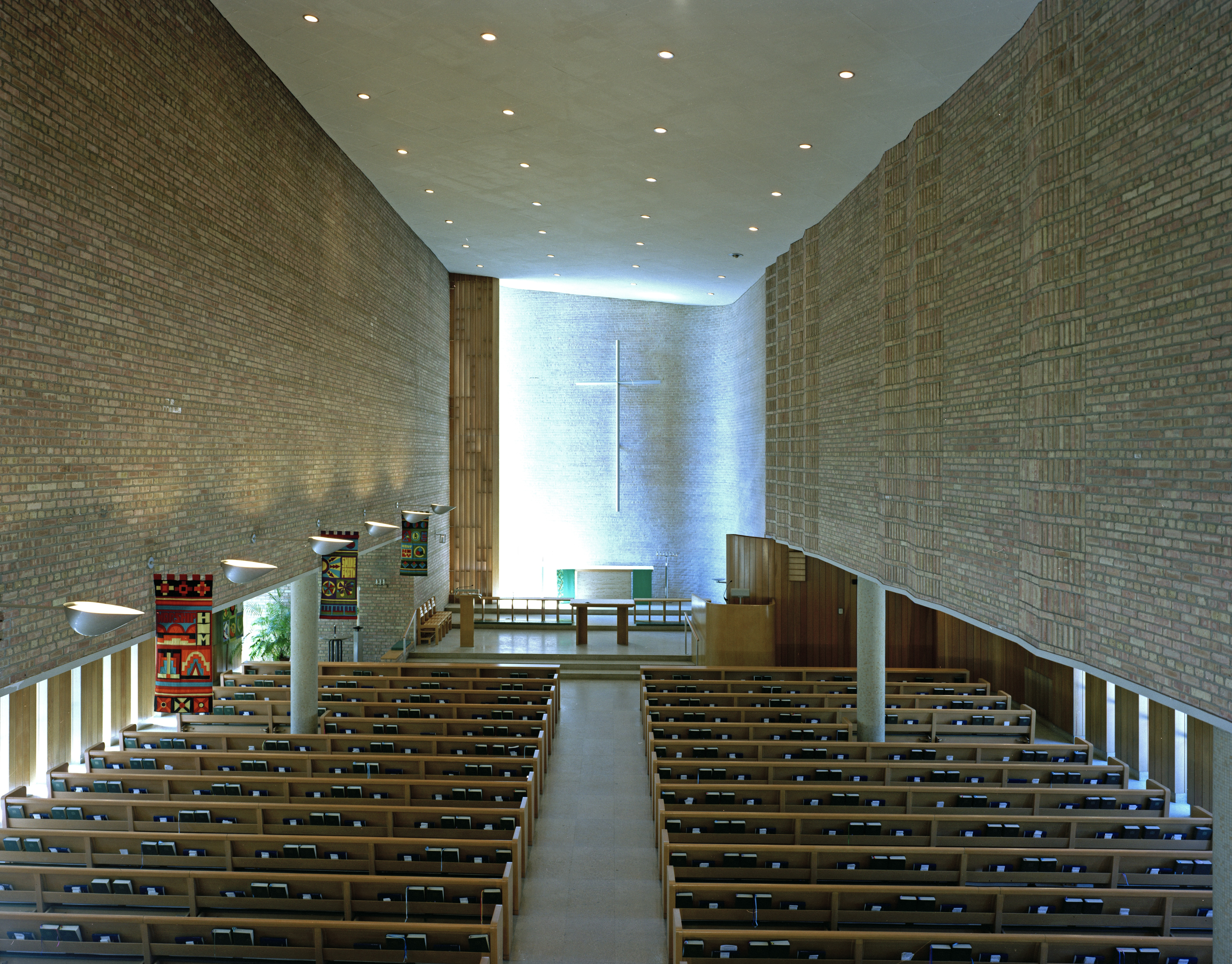
The church interior seen from the balcony

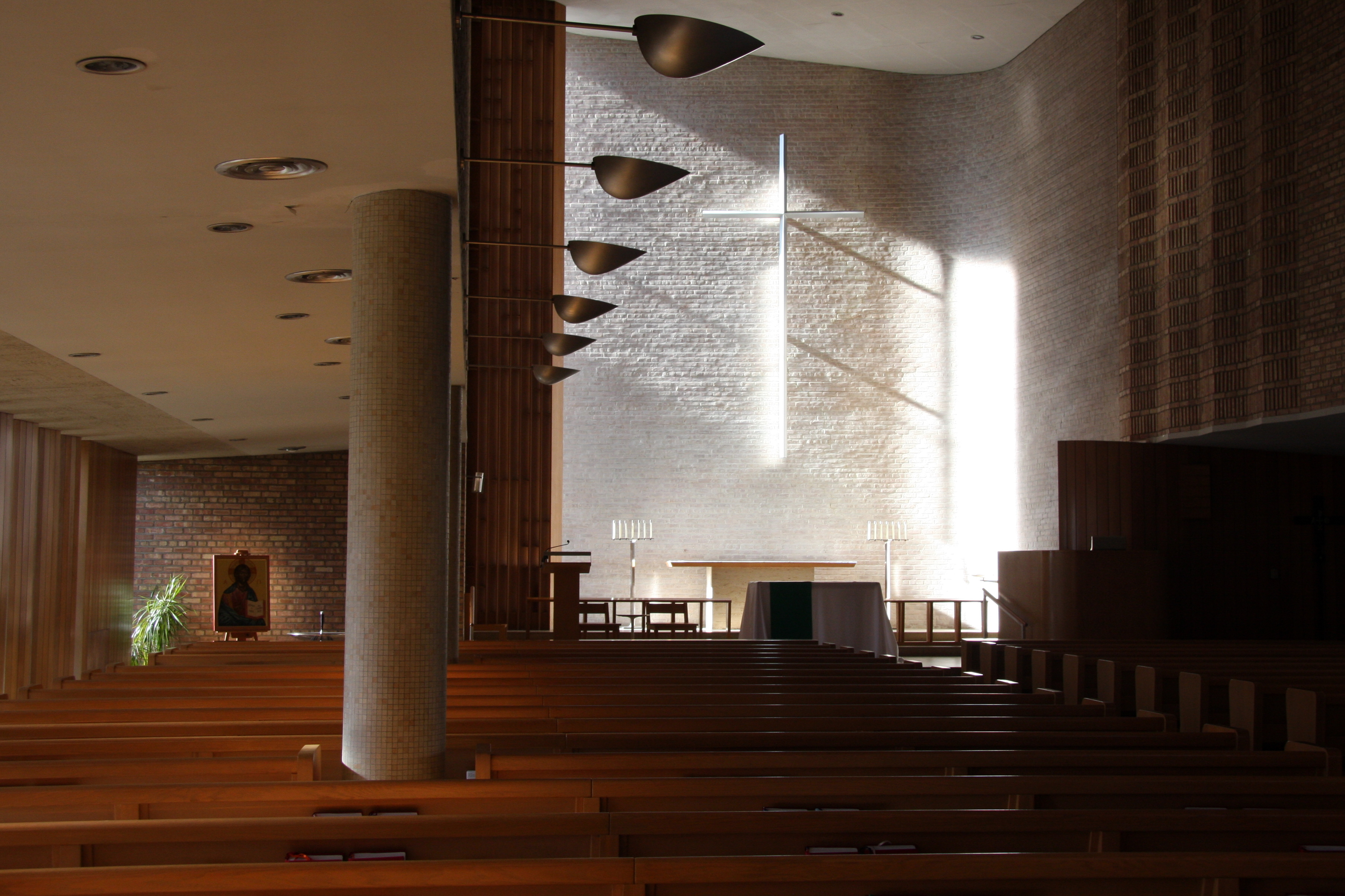
Inside the nave, facing the front

The International Style worship building, dedicated in 1949, was designed by the firm Saarinen and Saarinen, a father and son partnership of Eliel Saarinen (1873–1950) and Eero Saarinen (1910–1961); the project was Eliel Saarinen's last completed building. The sculptured stone panels were designed by William M. McVey (1922–1976). The design—an early example of modern American religious architecture—was widely published in the architectural, popular, and religious press, and provided inspiration for other modern churches built in the 1950s and 1960s. Noted conductor Osmo Vänskä said of the church that "It's a good place to play. The acoustics are good for music—for chamber music—and it's a good place for the audience to listen. It's a place not only for the congregation but also a venue for concerts."

The congregation opted to go with the design after finding that their plans for a traditional Gothic Revival building would be too costly. In 1946, a new pastor, William A. Buege, contacted the elder Saarinen, then the president of the Cranbrook Academy of Art, and convinced him to take the commission. Saarinen had designed the pioneering First Christian Church in Columbus, Indiana, in 1941 and used it as a model. It was Eliel Saarinen's last building; he died the following year. Upon the church's opening, Saarinen noted "if a building is honest, the architecture is religious." At first look, the church appears to be an oblong box, but actually it is an irregular quadrilateral—the side walls are not parallel, nor are the front and back walls.

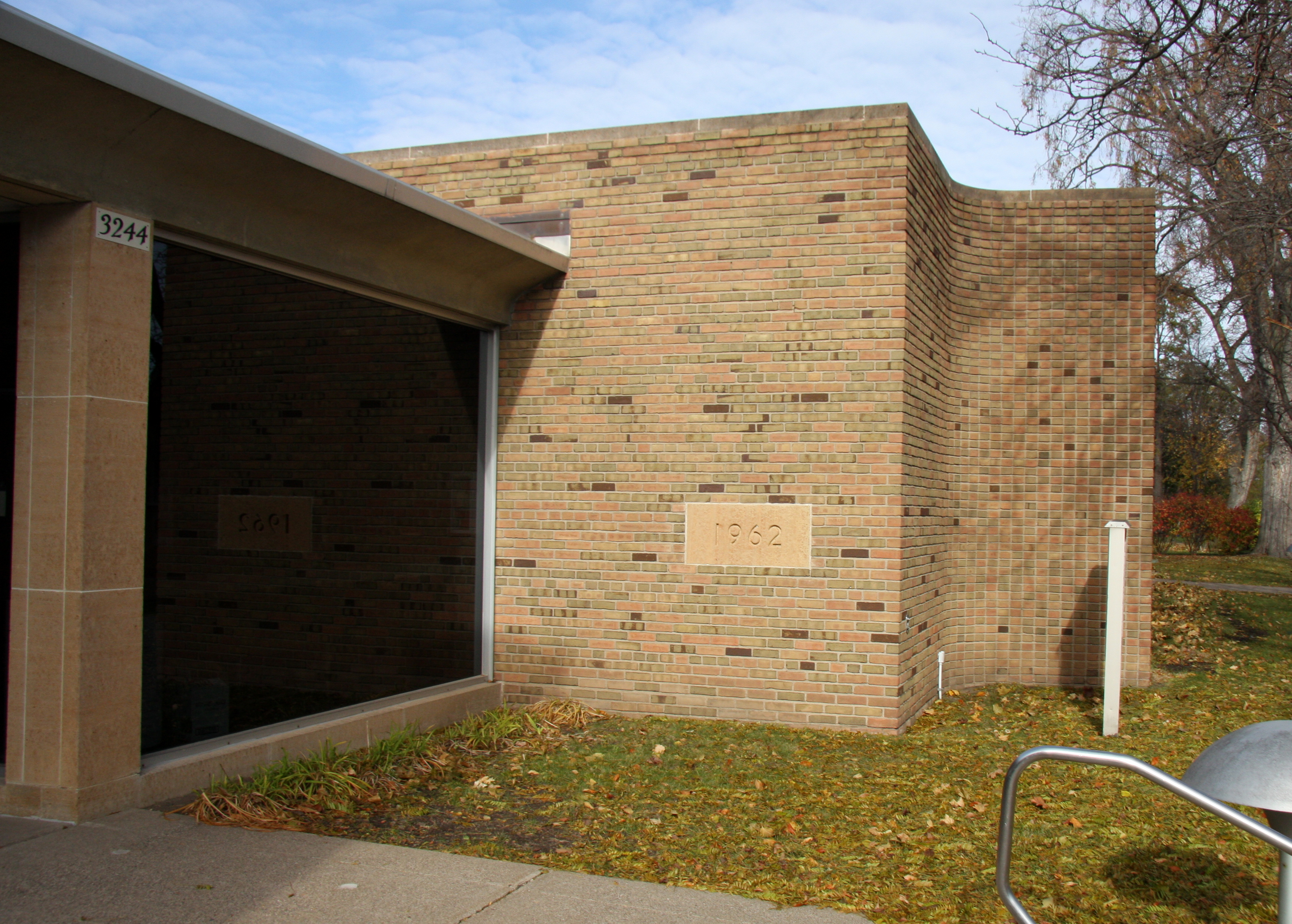
The 1962 education building

An addition, the education building (connected by an arcade and interior hallways) was designed under the supervision of Eero Saarinen by his former employee Glen Paulsen, and completed in 1962. By coincidence it was also Eero's last completed project; he died the year before. The addition is organized around a courtyard and was carefully designed to complement and complete their earlier worship building.

In 1977, the building was the eighth recipient of the American Institute of Architects' Twenty-five Year Award, one of only two places of worship to have been so honored. It is listed on the National Register of Historic Places. The entire building was named a National Historic Landmark by the National Park Service by the Secretary of the Interior on January 16, 2009.

Restoration of the bell tower was completed in 2011, and the courtyard was reconstructed in 2017. In 2018, the previous organ was replaced with a new pipe organ built by Dobson Pipe Organ Builders of Lake City, Iowa.

Free architecture tours are offered to the public at 11:00 a.m. on the second Sunday of every month. Tours are led by a trained docent from the non-profit Friends of Christ Church Lutheran. Tours for larger groups can be arranged with prior consultation.

== See also ==
- Chapel of the Resurrection (Valparaiso, Indiana), a landmark of mid-20th-century worship space design influenced by Christ Church Lutheran
- List of National Historic Landmarks in Minnesota
- National Register of Historic Places listings in Hennepin County, Minnesota
