= Convent Van Maerlant =

Former convent in Brussels, Belgium

- Couvent Van Maerlant (French); Van Maerlantklooster (Dutch)
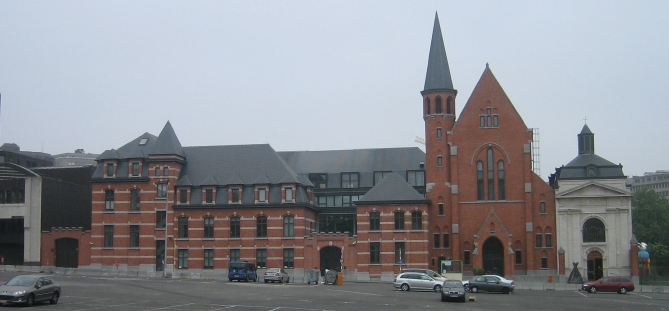
- The church is on the left in red brick. The chapel is the small grey building to the right.

General information
- Architectural style: Neo-Gothic
- Location: City of Brussels, Brussels-Capital Region, Belgium
- Coordinates: 50.84119°N 4.37815°E
- Current tenants: European Commission

The Convent Van Maerlant (French: Couvent Van Maerlant; Dutch: Van Maerlantklooster) is a former convent which consists of a church and the Chapel of the Resurrection on the Rue Van Maerlant/Van Maerlantstraat in Brussels, Belgium. It is named after Jacob van Maerlant, a medieval Flemish poet.

The original chapel was built in 1435 in the authority of a papal bull, and was renovated in the 1780s. The convent of the Sisters of Perpetual Adoration itself was converted from a ducal town house in the early 1850s. In 1905, a compulsory purchase order for land for Brussels-Central railway station was made on the Rue des Sols/Stuiversstraat, and this included the convent. As a result, a virtually identical chapel was built, which survived for another 45 years, only to finally be demolished in 1955. Falling vocations meant the convent was closed in the early 1980s, and after standing derelict for nearly 20 years, it was acquired to become the central library of the European Commission.

== History ==
=== First church ===
The Sisters of Perpetual Adoration, who became the Sisters of the Eucharist in 1969, were a chief Eucharistic Order founded by Anna de Meeûs, the eldest daughter of the Finance Minister and founding Chairman of the Société Générale de Belgique, Count Frederic de Meeûs. The original foundation was set up in 1844 in workshops belonging to the Church of Our Lady of Victories at the Sablon. The sisterhood rapidly outgrew its location. In 1848, the foundress' childhood friend, Baroness d'Hoogvorst (née Countess of Mercy-Argenteau), bought the building on the Rue des Sols/Stuiversstraat, originally the town house of the Counts of Salazar, from the visiting sisters. The sisters took up residence in 1850, and with the original chapel soon too small, rebuilt the neighbouring wing as a modern red neo-Gothic church. The chapel was built in 1435 on the corner of the Rue des Douze Apôtres/Twaalfapostelenstraat where Brussels' first synagogue had stood until the Jews were evicted in a pogrom in 1370 – the papal bull establishing the Eucharistic vocation as an expiation of the Host desecration.

The entire neighbourhood was acquired by the Belgian state in 1907 as part of a project to connect the North and South railway termini. The convent lay on the site of the planned Rue Courbe (now the Rue Ravenstein/Ravensteinstraat), which was designed by Henri Maquet to link the Royal Palace of Brussels to the centre. The convent buildings were bought by the city and served as a gym for the local primary school. Later, the church became a depot for Brussels' electric and road works department and the chapel housed a local garage owner. In 1955, they were all demolished in order to build the Ravenstein Gallery.

=== Current building ===
When the sisters left, they moved to the Maelbeek valley, and missing their old convent, copied the church and chapel (known as the Salazar from the Spanish noble family who built the adjoining mansion that would become the main convent building) in an identical style, though lacking some features due to monetary constraints. However, they were unable to manage them and ultimately left in 1974. The building deteriorated while developers argued, with one wishing to build seven nine-story office blocks on its site. Such development was blocked as the site was reserved for the Council of the European Union, which had to put the area over to housing. Public authorities pushed for its restoration and the developers eventually agreed. In 1996, it was fully renovated with a central atrium over the cloister, but the original features all still present. It is now occupied by the European Commission. The side chapel was also restored with sponsorship and was re-inaugurated as the Chapel of the Resurrection or the Chapel for Europe, on 25 September 2001.

== Architecture ==
The church is a 19th-century red brick neo-Gothic construction, though the rebuilt version of the early 1900s lacks the tower, side isles, stone decorations, rose window and pinnacles of the original.

The chapel, known today as Chapel of the Resurrection, is a duplicate of the 15th- and 18th-century original and was completely renovated in the 1990s, losing almost all its original internal features. It is neoclassical, with Doric columns, pediment and friezes. The stained glass windows were painted by the Viennese artist Thomas Reinhold. They were produced by the factory of the Schlierbach convent in Upper Austria and financed by nine Austrian regions to cover five biblical themes.

== Area and usage ==
The church serves as the central library of the European Commission, the Directorate-General for Interpretation, the Directorate-General for Education and Culture and the Brussels Office for Infrastructure and Logistics (the European Commission's historical archives service). The chapel is used as a local chapel and for dialogue between Christian groups in Europe.

It is located in areas known as the European Quarter and the Leopold Quarter. The neighbouring building to the south, built in the late 1980s and also housing European Commission offices, is of unusually high quality, out of a desire to help it fit in with its neighbouring Gothic church. Its height was also restricted to that of the convent.

Further to the south is Leopold Park and the Espace Léopold complex of the European Parliament and the buildings of the Committee of the Regions and Economic and Social Committee. To the east are modern condominium buildings and the Place Jean Rey/Jean Reyplein and to the north is the Justus Lipsius building of the Council of the European Union.

== See also ==
- Berlaymont building
- Charlemagne building
- Breydel building
- Madou Plaza Tower
- Brussels and the European Union
- Institutional seats of the European Union
- European Library
