= Historical Archives of the European Union =

The Historical Archives of the European Union (HAEU), located in Florence (Italy), is the official archives for the historical documents of the Institutions of the European Union. It is also a research centre dedicated to the archival preservation and study of European integration and is part of the European University Institute (EUI).

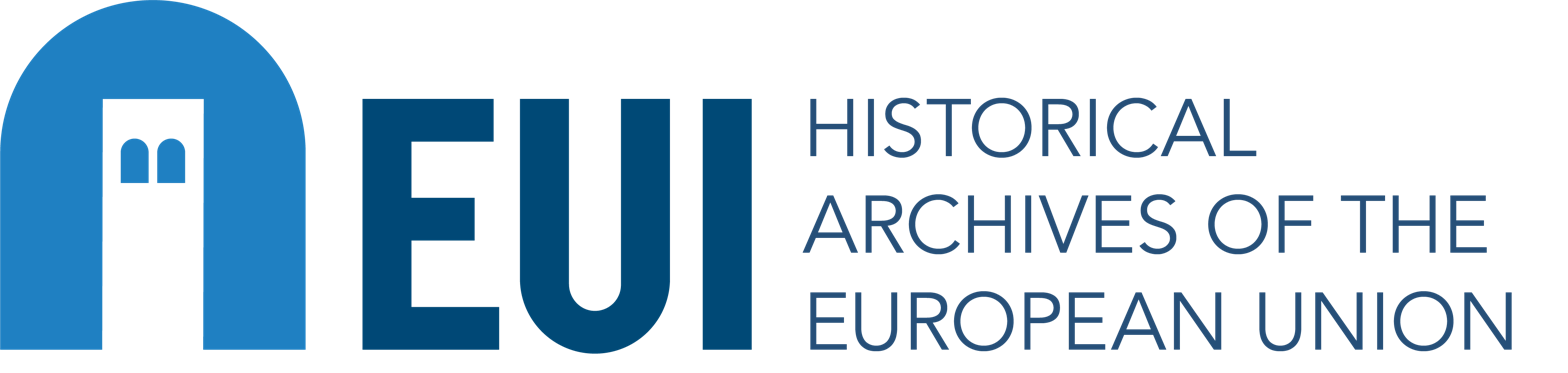
Logo of the Historical Archives of the European Union

== Legal Basis and History ==
The Historical Archives of the European Union was established in 1983 following the regulation by the Council of the European Communities and the decision by the Commission of the European Communities to open their historical archives to the public. A subsequent agreement in 1984 between the Commission of the European Communities and the EUI laid the groundwork for establishing the Archives in Florence, and the HAEU opened its doors to researchers and the public in 1986. In 2011 a Framework Partnership Agreement between the EUI and the European Commission reinforced the Historical Archives’ role in preserving and providing access to the archival holdings of the European Union's institutions and regulated the acquisition and treatment of private archives. In March 2015 the Council of the European Union amended the decisions of 1983 with the Council Regulation (EU) 2015/496.

== Mission ==
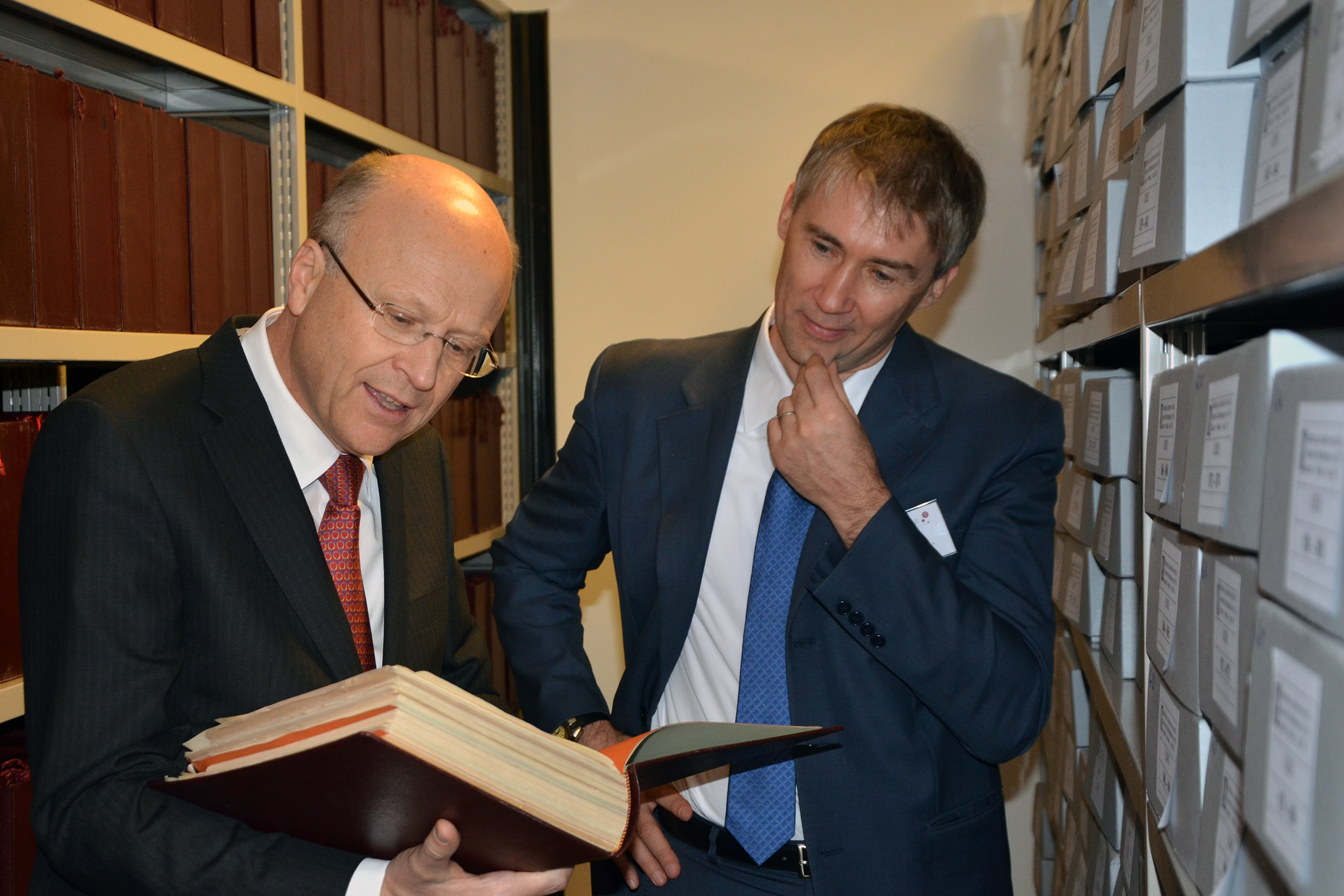
Koen Lenaerts, president of the European Court of Justice visits the HAEU deposits with the Director, Dieter Schlenker (December 2015).

The HAEU preserves and makes accessible the archival holdings of EU Institutions and Agencies according to the 30-year rule governing access to archives of the European Union. It also collects and preserves private papers of individuals, movements and international organizations involved in the European integration process. It facilitates research on the history of the European Union and its predecessor institutions, promotes public interest in European integration and enhances transparency in the functioning of European Union Institutions.

== Holdings ==
The holdings are composed of funds coming from the European Institutions, their predecessor institutions and European Union Agencies.

Among its holdings are the archives of the European Coal and Steel Community (ECSC), the European Economic Community (EEC), the European Atomic Energy Community (Euratom), the Common Assembly of the ECSC, the European Parliamentary Assembly, the Court of Justice of the European Union, the Economic and Social Committee, the Court of Auditors, and the European Investment Bank.

It also holds private deposits and collections from individuals, organisations and associations that advocated, supported and implemented the Post-World War II European conciliation and integration process. These holdings include the archival papers of the European Space Agency (ESA), the Assembly of Western European Union (WEU), the European Council for Municipalities and Regions (CCRN), the European League for Economic Cooperation (LECE) and a unique collection of federalist archives, for example the European Movement (ME), the Union of European Federalists (UEF) and the 'Centre international de formation européenne (CIFE)'.

In the framework of the activities of the ‘EU Inter-institutional Web Preservation Working Group’ and in collaboration with the Internet Memory Foundation the HAEU launched in 2013 an archiving pilot project on EU institutions’ websites. These websites are captured quarterly since the end of 2013 and made available on the HAEU's home page.

== Premises ==
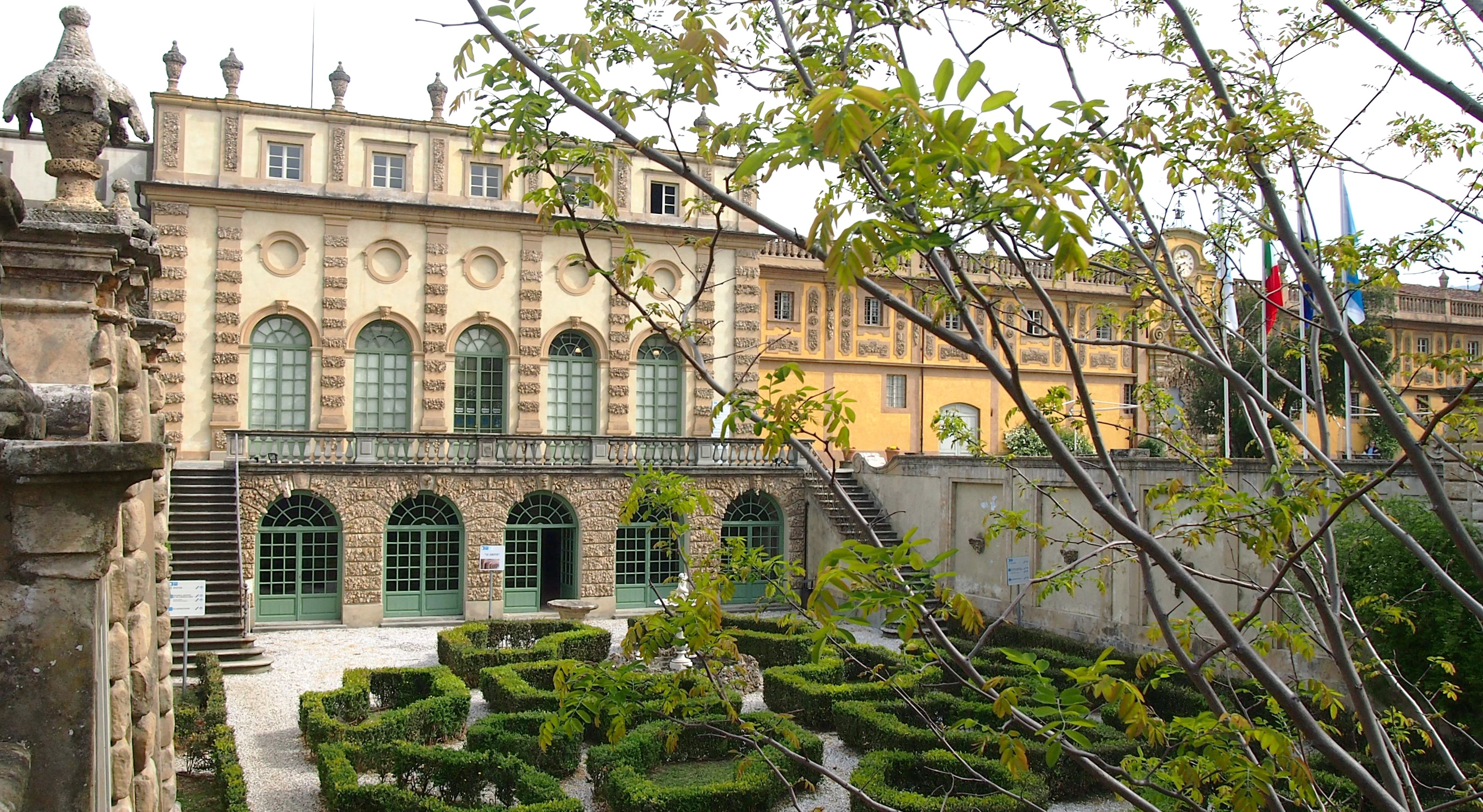
Historical Archives of the European Union headquarters at Villa Salviati, Florence (Italy) April 2015

Since 2012, the HAEU has his seat at the historic 'Villa Salviati' in Florence.

'Villa Salviati' is located on the Florentine hills along Via Bolognese and was named after one of its illustrious owners, Jacopo Salviati, who took possession of the estate in 1445. The Salviati family were wealthy wool merchants and bankers and during the 15th century closely connected to the Medici family.

A fortified house was present at the site since the 12th century, but the Salviati family elegantly decorated the villa and its gardens of 14 acres. The asymmetric facades show additions over the centuries but retain some of the crenellated castle look that is typical for a palace outside the city walls. With the passing of the Salviati family, the estate changed hands many times in the last two hundred years and was owned by the Borghese princes, the English Vansittart, the tenor Mario Da Candia, and Gustavo Hagermann in the 19th century.

It is said that in this palace, Veronica Cybo, the wife of Duke Salviati, consumed with jealousy, stabbed to death the Duke's mistress, a Caterina Canacci. Veronica arranged to lure the woman to the palace with the help of Bartolommeo, Caterina's stepson. She then proceeded to decapitate the unfortunate woman and then presented the head to her husband the Duke as a New Year's gift. For the crime, Veronica was exiled from Florence, and Bartolommeo was beheaded. Among the many allusions to the story, is a novel by Francesco Domenico Guerrazzi.

Since 2000 Villa Salviati has been the property of the Italian State and after the extensive restructuration it has been destined to host the HAEU with 11,000 linear metres of shelving created in a subterraneous deposit.

On 17 December 2009, the President of the Italian Republic Giorgio Napolitano has inaugurated the opening of the Historical Archives of the European Union at 'Villa Salviati' and in 2012 the Archives were operative.

== Consultation Services and Research Assistance ==
The HAEU has been present on the World Wide Web since 1995 and has developed an electronic online database since 1991. All inventories of fonds, collections and oral history programmes held by the HAEU are published and searchable on its website. The HAEU also publishes the information and the classification schemes of the institutional holdings on the 'Archives Portal EUROPE' and it is linked to the social media Facebook, Twitter, YouTube and Flickr.

The digitisation programme of archival units and photographs of various fonds and deposits launched in 2006 led to some 12.000 digitalized archival units being directly consultable on the website in pdf format. Likewise, the 600 transcriptions of the European Oral History Program and many audio registrations can be accessed on the site.

The reading room at 'Villa Salviati' is open to the public for consultation of its holdings. The facilities include a specialized reference library composed of 20.000 publications, printed documentation, grey literature and electronic publications.

Access to all archival documents, collections and interviews preserved at the HAEU and available online or in the reading room is free of charge.

The HAEU hosts and organises in close cooperation with the EUI History Department and with external partners research seminars, workshops and conferences. It proposes to be a meeting place between actors and researchers in European Integration matters. To this end, the HAEU co-directs with the EUI History Department the Alcide De Gasperi Research Centre for the History of European Integration, which was inaugurated on 6 May 2015 in the presence of Alcide De Gasperi’s daughter Maria Romana De Gasperi. The Alcide De Gasperi Research Centre aims to promote innovative research projects and facilitates the use of primary sources. It also coordinates networks of scholars and promotes publications on the history of European integration.

== Deposits - European Union institutions ==
=== The European Parliament ===
- AC - Assemblée commune de la CECA
- ACP - Organes parlementaires pour la coopération au développement
- AH - Assemblée ad hoc
- AO - Actes officiels
- CPPE - Coupures de presse du Parlement européen
- PE0 - Assemblée parlementaire européenne et Parlement européen avant l'élection directe
- PE1 - Parlement européen - Première législature
- PE2 - Parlement européen - Deuxième législature
- PE3 - Parlement européen – Troisième législature
- PE4 - Parlement européen – Quatrième législature
- PE5 - Parlement européen – Cinquième législature
- SG - Cabinets des secrétaires généraux

=== The Council of Ministers ===
- CM1 - Special Council of Ministers of the ECSC
- CM2 - Council of Ministers of the EEC and EURATOM
- CM3 - Intergovernmental Treaty Negotiations
- CM5 - Accessions to the European Communities and to the European Union
- CM6 - Negotiations in the framework of the Yaoundé Convention, the Lomé Convention and the Cotonou Agreement

=== The European Commission ===
- CECA Haute Autorité de la Communauté européenne du charbon et de l’acier (1952–1967)
- CEEA Commission Euratom (1958–1967)
- CCEE Commission de la Communauté Economique Européenne (1958–1967)
- CEUE Commission européenne (1967-)
- BAC - CEE/CEEA Commissions - Fonds BAC

=== The Court of Auditors ===
- CCE - Cour des comptes européenne
- CCE/DOC - Documentation annexée au fonds DOC/CCE
- CCO - Commission de contrôle

=== The Economic and Social Committee ===
- CES - Comité économique et social

=== The Court of Justice ===
- CJUE - Cour de justice de l'Union européenne

=== The European Investment Bank ===
- BEI - Banque européenne d'investissement

=== The Agencies of the European Union ===
- AEE - European Environment Agency
- CEDEFOP - Centre européen pour le développement de la formation professionnelle
- EF - European Foundation for the Improvement of Living and Working Condition

== Deposits - Individuals ==
=== A ===
- ACA - Antonio Cassese
- AD - André Darteil
- ADG - Alcide De Gasperi
- ALC - Albert Léon Coppé
- AM - Alexandre Marc
- AMG - Albert-Marie Gordiani
- AMG/DOC - Documentation annexée au fonds AMG
- AS - Altiero Spinelli
- AV - Angel Viñas
- AV/DOC - Documentation Annexed to Angel Viñas fonds

=== B ===
- BO - Bino Olivi
- BR - Bocklet Report

=== C ===
- CA - Christopher Audland
- CS - Claus Schöndube
- CSM - Carlo Scarascia Mugnozza

=== D ===
- DH - Danuta Hübner
- DW - David White Papers

=== E ===
- EBC - Enrique Barón Crespo
- EC - Emilio Colombo
- EEA - Enzo Enriques Agnoletti
- EEA/DOC - Documentation annexée au fonds EEA
- EG - Emanuele Gazzo
- EGI - Enrico Gibellieri
- EGI/DOC - Documentation annexée au fonds EGI
- EH - Etienne Hirsch
- EM - Edoardo Martino
- EM/DOC - Documentation annexée au fonds EM
- EN - Emile Noël
- ER - Ernesto Rossi
- ER/ACS - Ernesto Rossi/Archivio Centrale dello Stato
- ER/DOC - Documentation annexée au fonds ER

=== F ===
- FB - François Guillaume Bondy
- FBG - Fabrizia Baduel Glorioso
- FBG/DOC - Documentation annexée au fonds FBG
- FD - Fernand Dehousse
- FD/DOC - Documentation annexée au fonds FD
- FDLV - Fausta Deshormes La Valle
- FF - Franz Froschmaier
- FL - François Lamoureux
- FMM - Franco Maria Malfatti
- FXO - François-Xavier Ortoli

=== G ===
- GA - Gordon Adam
- GB - Günter Burghardt
- GF - Giulio Fossi
- GJLA - Graham J. L. Avery
- GJLA/DOC - Documentation annexed to fonds GJLA
- GP - Georg Pröpstl
- GR - Georges Rencki
- GW - Graham Watson
- GZ - Giancarlo Zoli

=== H ===
- HALK - Sammlung 'Robert Schuman' von Hans August Lücker
- HB - Hendrik de Bruijn
- HC - Henri Cartan
- HG - Helmut Goetz
- HVV - Helmut von Verschuer
- HW - Helen Wallace

=== I ===
- IML - Ivan Matteo Lombardo

=== J ===
- JD - Jacques Delors
- JG - Jules Guéron
- JG/DOC - Documentation annexée au fonds JG
- JP - John Pinder
- JPG - Jean-Pierre Gouzy

=== K ===
- KM - Klaus Meyer

=== L ===
- LC - Lorella Cedroni
- LLS - Lionello Levi Sandri
- LN - Lorenzo Natali

=== M ===
- MB - Monica Stefania Baldi
- MC - Mauro Cappelletti
- MID - Keith Middlemas
- MK - Max Kohnstamm
- MR - Michel Richonnier
- MT - Michael Tracy
- MW - Michel Waelbroeck

=== O ===
- OM - Otto Molden
- OZ - Orlof Zimmermann

=== P ===
- PA - Pierre Auger
- PD - Philippe Deshormes
- PDE - Pierre Debest
- PDE/DOC - Documentation annexée au fonds PDE
- PF - Paolo Falcone
- PF/DOC - Documentation annexée au fonds PF
- PHS - Paul-Henri Spaak
- PL - Philip Lowe
- PLA - Pascal Lamy
- PLS - Pasquale Lino Saccá
- PM - Piero Malvestiti
- PM/DOC - Documentation imprimée provenant du fonds Piero Malvestiti déposée auprès de l'Institut Luigi Sturzo de Rome
- PSP - Peter Sutherland's Commission Papers
- PU - Pierre Uri
- PVD - Pier Virgilio Dastoli
- PVD/DOC - Documentation annexée au fonds PVD

=== R ===
- RB - Richard Burke
- RH - Robert Hull
- RP - Romano Prodi
- RR - Raymond Rifflet
- RS - Roberto Santaniello
- RT - Robert Triffin
- RTA - Roland Tavitian
- RTO - Robert Toulemon

=== S ===
- SM - Sergio Manetti
- SP - Samuele Pii

=== T ===
- TPS - Tommaso Padoa Schioppa

=== U ===
- UWK/NS - Uwe Kitzinger and Noël Salter
- UWK/NS/DOC - Uwe Kitzinger and Noël Salter Documentation

=== W ===
- WM - Walter Much

== Deposits - Corporate Bodies ==
=== Non-EU Organisations ===
- BEUC - Bureau Européen des Unions de Consommateurs
- CRE - Conférence permanente des Recteurs, Présidents et Vice-Chanceliers des Universités européennes
- EABH - European Association for Banking and Financial History e.V.
- EFTA - European Free Trade Association
- ESA - European Space Agency
- ESF - European Science Foundation
- ETUC - European Trade Union Confederation
- EUI - European University Institute
- EUROSDR - European Spatial Data Research
- EYF - European Youth Forum
- OEEC - Organisation for European Economic Cooperation
- UACES - University Association for Contemporary European Studies
- WEU - Assembly of Western European Union

=== Pro-European Movements ===
- AEDE - Association européenne des enseignants
- BEC - Bureau Européen de Coordination des Organisations Internationales de Jeunesse
- CCRE - Conseil des Communes et des Régions d'Europe
- CCRE/DOC - Documentation annexée au fonds CCRE
- CENYC - Council of European National Youth Committees
- CIFE - Centre international de formation européenne
- CIFE/IT - Centro Italiano di Formazione Europea
- EUBW - Europa-Union Deutschland: Landesverband Baden-Württemberg
- FDE - Femmes d'Europe
- JEF - Jeunesse européenne fédéraliste
- LECE - Ligue européenne de coopération économique
- ME - Mouvement européen
- ME/DOC - Documentation annexée au fonds ME
- MFE - Movimento federalista europeo
- MFE/F - Mouvement fédéraliste européen français
- OFME - Organisation française du Mouvement européen
- SEC - Société européenne de culture
- UEF - Union européenne des fédéralistes
- YFEC - Youth Forum of the European Communities

=== Political Groups of the European Parliament ===
- ADLE - Groupe de l'Alliance des démocrates et des libéraux pour l’Europe au Parlement européen
- GPSE - Groupe du Parti socialiste européen au Parlement européen
- GRAEL - Groupe parlementaire européen vert
- PPE - Groupe du Parti populaire européen au Parlement européen
