= Chapel of the Resurrection (Valparaiso, Indiana) =

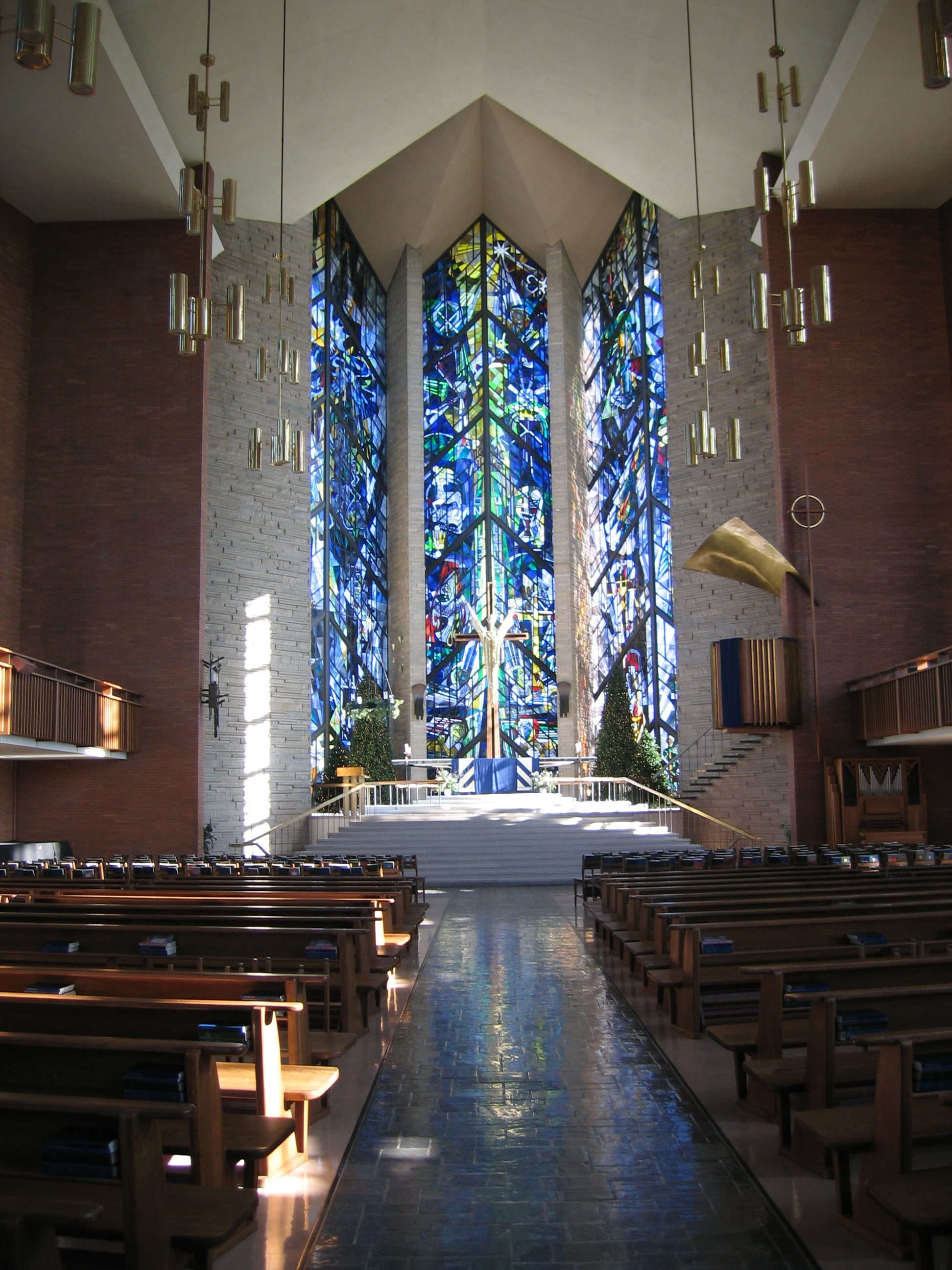
- Nave and chancel, including altar and stained glass, in the Chapel
- Chapel of the Resurrection
- 41.463105°N 87.041723°W
- Location: Valparaiso, Indiana
- Country: United States
- Denomination: Lutheran
- Website: www.valpo.edu/chapel

History
- Former name: Memorial Chapel
- Dedicated: September 27, 1959
- Consecrated: September 27, 1959

Architecture
- Architect(s): Charles Stade and Associates
- Architectural type: Chapel
- Style: Modern
- Groundbreaking: October 28, 1956
- Completed: 1959
- Construction cost: $7.5 million

Specifications
- Capacity: 2000
- Height: 58 feet (18 m)

- Valparaiso University Chapel of the Resurrection
- U.S. National Register of Historic Places
- NRHP reference No.: 100007172
- Added to NRHP: November 16, 2021

The Chapel of the Resurrection is the centerpiece structure on the campus of Valparaiso University in Valparaiso, Indiana.

Primarily used to facilitate many Lutheran campus worship services, the Chapel of the Resurrection also serves as a site for convocations, musical performances, guest lectures, and commencement ceremonies.

The chapel's chancel is 98 feet (30 m) high and is circular in shape; the roof of the apse is shaped like a nine-pointed star. The nave is 58 feet (18 m) high and 193 feet (59 m) long. The building capacity is around 2000, although this number is flexible depending upon the configuration of the chairs, which recently replaced the pews. To the southwest of the Chapel lies the Brandt Campanile, a 12-bell tower rising 143 feet (44 m) tall.

Clearly visible from U.S. Route 30 and throughout the surrounding community, the building is located on the highest point of ground on the Valparaiso University campus and is a Northwest Indiana landmark.

== History ==
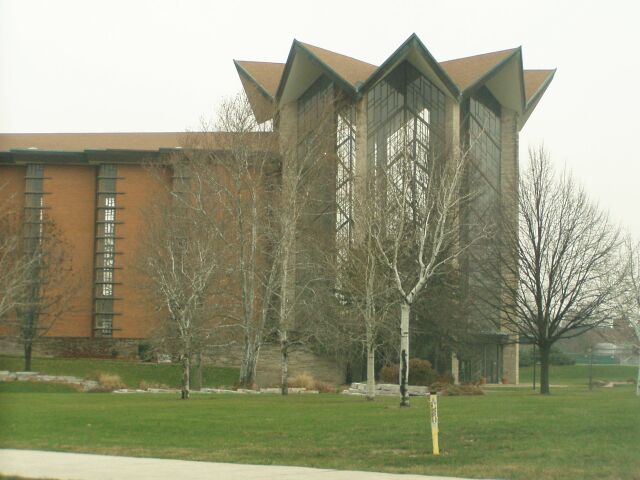

Groundbreaking for the Chapel construction took place in 1956. The building was designed by the architectural firm Stade, Dolan, Anderson of Park Ridge, Illinois, though certain elements and features (e.g., the stone baptistry, the stained glass windows, etc.) were designed by other artists. Peter Dohmen Studios of St. Paul, Minnesota designed the 95-foot (29 m) high stained glass windows, as well as the marble interzia altar, and the mosaic at the entrance of the chapel. Adalbert Raphael Kretzmann, pastor and brother of Valparaiso University president O. P. Kretzmann, joined Charles Stade in the building's design.

The altar is 20 feet (6.1 m) long, made of various types of Italian marble. Peter Dohmen designed the inlaid marble pedestals to depict, with symbols, the four evangelists. Matthew is represented by an angel, Mark by a lion, John by an eagle, and Luke by an ox.

Peter Dohmen learned his skills at the top art academies of Europe. He became a well-known artist in Germany during the 1930s, executing major art works, such as stained glass windows, frescos on major public buildings, mosaics, etc. During the early 1940s he was blackballed by the government because of his outspoken opposition against the Nazi party. He emigrated to the United States with his family in 1951 and continued his artistic trade with great success. Amongst some of his major works are the stained glass windows in the library of the University of Notre Dame.

Total construction costs of the chapel were about $7.5 million, much of which came through individual donations.

The building was dedicated in 1959, part of Valparaiso University's centennial celebration, and officially designated as the Chapel of the Resurrection at the 10th anniversary service in 1969.

In July and August 2005, the university built a medieval-style prayer labyrinth on the east side of the chapel, 64 feet in diameter. The university is adding 11,000 square feet (1,000 m^{2}) to the building in 2014, known as the Helge Center.

== Organ ==
The Reddel Organ in the chapel was built by organ builder Herman Schlicker of Buffalo, New York. A contract for the organ was signed on September 27, 1957, at a cost of $68,000. These funds paid for about three-quarters of the entire specification, the price of which would have been $98,000. Paul Bunjes of Concordia College, River Forest, Illinois, was retained as consultant. The instrument was dedicated at the morning Eucharist on September 27, 1959, and was featured that evening in a recital by E. Power Biggs to a record audience of over 2,000 people. It was rebuilt and enlarged in 1995–1996 by Dobson Pipe Organ Builders of Lake City, Iowa.

== See also ==
- Coventry Cathedral, a church building in very similar style in Coventry, England
- Christ Church Lutheran (Minneapolis, Minnesota), an influence on the Chapel of the Resurrection, and whose pastor would become Valparaiso's Dean of the Chapel in 1964
- First Unitarian Society of Madison Meeting House, a Frank Lloyd Wright-designed church building that influenced the chapel's design
