= Tabernacle societies =

The Tabernacle Societies were lay Eucharistic Adorative associations within Roman Catholic parishes, principally in the United States and Australia, forming part of the Archassociation of the Eucharist under the guidance of the Association of Perpetual Adoration of the Blessed Sacrament.

== History ==
The Association of Perpetual Adoration of the Blessed Sacrament and of work for poor churches was founded in Brussels by Anne de Meeûs, the eldest daughter of the Belgian Minister of Finance Count Frederic de Meeûs. The foundation of the sisterhood grew out of an initial call to restore the parish church at Ohain, Belgium. That church's fittings were totally worn out after fifty years of official neglect following the invasion of Belgium by the French Directory in 1792, followed by an unsympathetic government under Napoleon and King William II of the Netherlands. In 1843 Mlle de Meeus, then twenty years of age, at the request of the rector visited the sacristy of the church near their chateau and other churches. She conceived the idea of an association with the object of adoration of the Blessed Sacrament by persons willing to undertake to make monthly an hour of adoration, and to give yearly an offering for the benefit of poor churches.

The original foundation was set up in 1844 in workshops belonging to the Church of Our Lady of Victories at the Sablon. The sisterhood rapidly outgrew its location. The Association of Perpetual Adoration and Work for Poor Churches was organized in 1848 under the direction of Rev. Jean Baptiste Boone, S.J., and through the generosity of the foundress' childhood friend, the Baroness d'Hoogvorst (née Countess of Mercy-Argenteau), re-located to the Convent Van Maerlant on the Rue des Sols/Stuiversstraat. By 1851 the Association had the approval of the bishops of Belgium.

== Sisters of Perpetual Adoration ==
A number of Association members formed themselves into a religious congregation, that of the Dames de l'Adoration perpétuelle (Sisters of Perpetual Adoration), Miss de Meeûs becoming the first mother superior. The constitutions were approved by Pius IX in March, 1872.

The ministry of the sisters includes religious instruction, preparation for first Communion, and retreats. Through their principal work, the Association, they strive to promote the Forty Hours Devotion, and grants of vestments to poor churches.

With a decline in vocations the sisters were unable to continue the perpetual adoration, and in 1969 renamed the institute the "Sisters of the Eucharist". In 1989, the nuns decided to sell the Convent Van Maerlant buildings, including the small chapel. As of mid-2007 the foundation was in the final stages of liquidation, there being a mere dozen remaining sisters of an average of around eighty years of age.

=== Association of Perpetual Adoration and work for Poor Churches ===
The society quickly spread and in 1853 was erected an archassociation with power to affiliate other similar groups. The mother-house of the Sisters of Perpetual Adoration was transferred to Rome, which then became the centre of the association. The decree of Pope Leo XIII of February, 1879 states: “The archassociation ...is subordinate to the institute as to its head, and must be subordinate to it in virtue of the constitutions approved by the Holy See."

Members pledged themselves to spend an hour each month in adoration before the Blessed Sacrament and to pay yearly dues into a fund for the benefit of poor churches. The contributions were used to purchase materials for vestments which are made by women members of the society and donated to poor churches.

The eleventh Eucharistic Congress was held in Brussels in 1898 in the church in which the society was founded, and on that occasion a glowing tribute was paid to its work. In Belgium alone it had nearly 200,000 members.

== Similar groups ==
Mention should be made of the association as it was maintained in convents of Religious of the Sacred Heart. The United States convents were founded by Rev. Mother Mary Aloysia Hardey, then assistant superior general of the Society, on the occasion of her visit in 1874, in connection with the Sodality of the Children of Mary, and it saw rapid growth in its work for poor churches. Paris is the centre of the Archconfraternity of Perpetual Adoration and work for Tabernacles, founded there in the Church of St. Thomas Aquinas in 1846 and with affiliations in the dioceses of France and Algiers. It was approved by Pius IX in 1856 and made a confraternity in 1858.
