= Europa (web portal) =

Official web portal of the European Union

- Website type: Public service portal and institutional information
- Owner: European Union
- Creator: European Commission
- Website: europa.eu
- Commercial: No
- Launched: February 1995; 31 years ago
- Current status: online

Europa is the official web portal of the European Union (EU), providing information on how the EU works, related news, events, publications and links to websites of institutions, agencies and other bodies. .europa.eu is also used as a common second level domain for the websites of the EU's bodies, for instance iss.europa.eu is the address of the Institute for Security Studies.

Europa was first published in February 1995 at the G7 ministerial meeting on information society in Brussels. Originally designed for that specific event, the portal expanded rapidly and the European Commission decided to develop it into a general information resource, specialising in the work and domain of the EU's bodies.

Laws and documents of major public interest are published in all 24 official EU languages. Documents that are not legally binding are usually published in the EU's institutional working languages; English, French and German.

== Services ==
Europa also offers other services such as:

- EU law (EUR-Lex)
- EU TV information service, (Europe by satellite)
- EU Open Data (EU Open Data Portal)
- contact data of EU officials in management positions (EU Whoiswho)
- EU research and development (CORDIS)
- public procurement (TED)

== See also ==
- Agency of the European Union
- EUR-Lex
- European NAvigator
- EuroVoc
- Institutions of the European Union
- Publications Office of the European Union
