= Directive on intra-EU-transfers of defence-related products =

Directive 2009/43/EC
- European Union directive
- Title: Directive on intra-EU-transfers of defence-related products
- Made by: European Parliament & Council
- Made under: Article 95 TEC, today Article 114 TFEU
- Journal reference: L 146 pp 1-10

History
- Date made: 6 May 2009
- Entry into force: 30 June 2009

Other legislation
- Amended by: Directive 2010/80/EU

Directive on intra-EU-transfers of defence-related products (officially: Directive 2009/43/EC of the European Parliament and of the Council of the European Union of 6 May 2009 simplifying terms and conditions of transfers of defence-related products within the Community) is a European Union Directive with relevance for the European Economic Area. "Transfer" in this context means "any transmission or movement of a defence-related product from a supplier to a recipient in another Member State" (Article 3.2).

The directive entered into force at the end of June in 2009. The deadline for transposition in the member states was 30 June 2011. The national laws, regulations and administrative provisions necessary to comply with this directive became effective 30 June 2012 (Article 18). There is also an amending act, the Directive 2010/80/EU.

Directive 2009/43/EC defines a "European licence system" for the transfer of defence-related-products within the European Union. Defence-related products mean any products listed in the annex of the directive. All these products correspond to those listed in the Common Military List of the European Union.

The main objective of the Directive 2009/43/EC is to build an internal market for defence-related products.

== Background and objectives ==
The member states of the European Union each have their own licensing system concerning the export of defence-related products. There are differences in procedures, scope and duration. These disparities can destroy the competitiveness of European defence industry and can create barriers that hamper exports of defence-related products in the internal market.

According to Article 1 of the directive, the aim "is to simplify the rules and procedures applicable to the intra-EU-transfer of defence-related products in order to ensure the proper functioning of the internal market". Furthermore, the conditions for SMEs' participation in armament development and production shall be improved. In addition, the European Commission intends to increase the industrial cooperation of defence-related products to generate economies of scale Overall, the directive aims to facilitate the intra-EU-transfer of defence-related products and to improve the competitiveness of the European defence industry on an international level.

== Prior authorisation ==
In accordance with Article 4 of the directive, the movement of defence-related products between EU member states is subject to prior authorisation. For the whole intra-EU-transfer only one transfer licence is necessary. There are three types of export licences: the general transfer licence; the global transfer licence as well as the individual transfer licence. The individual transfer licences would remain the exception.

=== Global transfer licence ===
According to Article 6 of the directive, a global transfer licence shall be granted on request to individual suppliers. With such a licence the supplier can deliver products to one or more recipients in other member states during a period of three years. The licence is renewable.

=== Individual transfer licence ===
Article 7 of the directive describes the usage of an individual transfer licence. Such a licence shall be granted on request. With an individual transfer licence a supplier can deliver products only once to only one recipient in another member state.

=== General transfer licence ===
According to Article 5 of the directive, general transfer licences are granted ex officio. A request for them is not needed. All movements that meet the legal conditions of the licence are authorized automatically.

Such licences give suppliers the chance and the opportunity to export different kinds of defence-related products to different recipients placed in different member states without a request.

Under Article 5 of the directive, general transfer licences shall be published at least in the following cases, for transfer:

- to certified recipients
- to the armed forces of other member states
- for demonstration, evaluation or exhibition purposes
- for maintenance and repair purposes

== Certification of recipients ==
Article 9 of the directive lays down the rules for the "certification of recipients" and provides some criteria, which have to be considered during the certification process. Furthermore, there is the Commission Recommendation 2011/24/EU on the certification of defence undertakings under Article 9 of Directive 2009/43/EC.

In each member state there is a competent authority, which has to carry out the certification of companies based on certain criteria. If a company is certified, suppliers from other member states can deliver defence-related products to this company by using a general transfer licence. The certification will be valid for five years.

== Obligations of suppliers ==
Article 8 (3) of the directive foresees the obligation for the suppliers to keep certain records of their transfers.

According to Article 8 (1,2) of the directive suppliers have to inform

- recipients of the terms and conditions of the transfer licence.
- the competent authority of their intention to use a general transfer licence for the first time.
