= EU Open Data Portal =

Public service portal

- Website type: Public service portal and institutional information
- Available in: 24 official languages of the EU
- Owner: European Union
- Creator: EU Publications Office
- Website: data.europa.eu
- Commercial: No
- Registration: Not required
- Launched: December 2012
- Content license: Open

Before data.europa.eu, the EU Open Data Portal was the point of access to public data published by the EU institutions, agencies and other bodies. On 21 April 2021, it was consolidated with the European Data Portal into data.europa.eu.

Public data can be used and reused for commercial or non‑commercial purposes. The portal was a key instrument of the EU open data strategy. By ensuring easy and free access to data, their innovative use and economic potential can be enhanced. The goal of the portal was also to make the institutions and other EU bodies more transparent and accountable.

== Legal basis and launch of the portal ==
Launched in December 2012, the portal was formally established by Commission Decision of 12 December 2011 (2011/833/EU) on the reuse of Commission documents to promote accessibility and reuse.

Based on this decision, all the EU institutions were invited - and are still today - to publish information such as open data and to make it accessible to the public whenever possible.

The operational management of the portal was the task of the Publications Office of the European Union. Implementation of EU open data policy was the responsibility of the Directorate General for Communications Networks, Content and Technology (DG CONNECT) of the European Commission. This is still true today with data.europa.eu.

== Features ==
The portal enabled users to search, explore, link, download and easily re-use data for commercial or non-commercial purposes, through a common metadata catalogue. From the portal, users could access data published on the websites of the various institutions, agencies and other bodies of the EU.

Semantic technologies offered additional functionalities. The metadata catalogue could be searched via an interactive search engine and through SPARQL queries.

Users could suggest data they think is missing on the portal and give feedback on the quality of data obtainable.

The interface was in 24 EU official languages, but most metadata was available in a limited number of languages (English, French and German). Some of the metadata (e.g. names of the data providers and geographical coverage) was in 24 languages.

== Terms of use ==
Most of the data accessible via the EU Open Data Portal was covered by the legal notice of the Europa website. Generally, data could be used for free for commercial and non-commercial purposes, provided the source is acknowledged. Specific conditions for reuse, relating mostly to the protection of data privacy and intellectual property, applied to a small amount of data. A link to these conditions could be found for each dataset.

The terms of use could be found on the site. As of November 2020, most data was covered by the Creative Commons CC‑BY‑4.0 license and the site metadata by the Creative Commons CC0‑1.0 public domain waiver.

== Available data ==
The portal contained a wide variety of open data across EU policy domains, including the economy, employment, science, environment and education. The importance of these was confirmed by the G8 Open Data Charter.

At the time it was merged into data.europa.eu, around 70 EU institutions, bodies or departments (e.g. Eurostat, the European Environment Agency, the Joint Research Centre and other European Commission Directorates General and EU Agencies) had made datasets available, making a total of over 13,000.

The portal also contained a gallery of applications and a visualisations catalogue (launched in March 2018).

In the apps gallery users could find applications using EU data and developed by the EU institutions, agencies or other bodies or by third parties. The applications were displayed as much for their information value as for giving examples of what applications can be made using the data.

The visualisations catalogue offered a collection of visualisation tools, training and re-usable visualisations for all levels of data visualisation expertise, from beginner to expert.

== Architecture of the portal ==
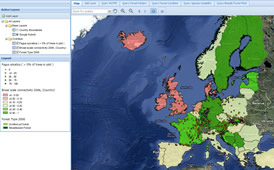

The portal was built using open source solutions such as the Drupal content management system and CKAN, the data catalogue software developed by the Open Knowledge Foundation. It used Virtuoso as an RDF database and has a SPARQL endpoint.

Its metadata catalogue applies international standards such as: Dublin Core, the data catalogue vocabulary DCAT-AP and the Asset Description Metadata Schema (ADMS).

To promote linked open data, the portal makes extensive use of controlled vocabularies, such as EuroVoc.

== See also ==
- Open data
- Open Data Directive
- European Union
- European Commission
- Institutions of the European Union
- Agencies of the European Union
