= European Documentation Centre =

Body of the European Commission

A European Documentation Centre (EDC) is a body designated by the European Commission to collect and disseminate publications of the European Union for the purposes of research and education. There are 400 such centers in all member states of the EU. The mandate of an EDC is to receive all official EU publications, documents, contracts and electronic databases then make them available to researchers, educators, students, and interested members of the general public. The centers are also legal depositories of Acquis communautaire (EU law). Although primarily academic in nature, anyone can visit an EDC to consult official EU publications.

== History and organisation ==
European Documentation Centres were founded in 1963 by the European Commission. They are predominantly located at universities, university libraries, affiliated academic institutions, and non-university research institutes, both public and private. EU policy is that at least one EDC should be located in each region of a European Union member state. Candidate states and other countries can also have a designated EDC, supported jointly with local university libraries and the European Commission. EDCs are distinct from European Information Centers (EIC), which are geared more to the general public and consumer affairs.

The official purpose of the centres is:

- Assist Universities and Institutes in education and research
- Contribute to the transparency of European decision-making
- Promote active debate on European policy and European integration
- Assist interested members of the public to learn about EU policies in more depth.

== Function ==
The European Documentation Centres collect documents and publications that they receive from the various official institutions of the European Union. They also provide training and advice on the organisation and use of electronic information generated by EU institutions. EDCs also provide direct support to the academic staff and employees at universities and institutions in their research and teaching on European integration process.

Official EU Publications:

  - Proceedings of the European Commission
  - Official Journal of the European Union
  - European Union Contracts
  - Rulings of the European Court
  - Statistical publications of the Publishing Department (OPOCE)
  - Legislative Observatory of European Parliaments
  - Other official documents

Official EU Databases:

- CORDIS: The EU Research Information Service
- Curia: EU Jurisprudence
- EUR-Lex: EU legislation
- PreLex: Inter-institutional procedures
- Eurostat: European statistics
- SCADplus: Scadplus: EU Legislation
- Tenders Electronic Daily: EU contracts and procurement

== See also ==
- German National Library of Economics (ZBW)
