= Directive 2001/19/EC =

- European Union directive
- Text with EEA relevance
- Title: Directive concerning the professions of nurse responsible for general care, dental practitioner, veterinary surgeon, midwife, architect, pharmacist and doctor
- Made by: European Parliament and Council of the European Union
- Journal reference: L206, 31.07.2001, p.1-51

History
- Date made: 14 May 2001
- Entry into force: 31 July 2001
- Applies from: 31 December 2002

2001/19/EC is a directive of the European Parliament and Council that controls the general system for the recognition of professional qualifications of architects, dental practitioners, midwives, veterinary surgeons, pharmacists, and general healthcare workers in the European Union.

This amended directives 89/48/EC and 92/51/EC on the general system for the recognition of professional qualifications and directives 77/452/EC, 77/453/EC, 78/686/EC, 78/697/EC, 78/1026/EC, 80/154/EC, 80/155/EC, 85/384/EC, 85/432, 85/433/EC and 93/16/EC concerning the above-mentioned professions.

The general system Directives permit the host Member State to require, subject to certain conditions, to take compensation steps, notably where substantial differences exist between the theoretical and/or practical education and training undergone and that covered by the qualification required in the host Member State.

2001/19/EC ended enforcement on 19 October 2007.
