= SCADPlus =

SCADPlus is an information portal maintained by the European Commission, providing public access to European Union initiatives and policies. The information is of a general nature and not intended for legal or technical research purposes. In its disclaimer the Commission states that "it cannot be guaranteed that a document available on-line exactly reproduces an officially adopted text. Only European Union legislation published in paper editions of the Official Journal of the European Union is deemed authentic." Advisory services on how to use the information on SCADPlus are available at the 400 European Documentation Centres across the European Union.

As of middle 2007, some 2,500 fact sheets, divided into 32 subject areas, summarize EU legislation of the Activities of the EU. They should provide a complete summary of the latest legislative developments and are available in four languages of the EU: English, French, German and Spanish.

Some 1,000 fact sheets with general interest information are also available in the eleven languages which were the official languages of the European Union before 1 May 2004 (Danish, Dutch, English, Finnish, French, German, Greek, Italian, Portuguese, Spanish and Swedish).

The nine languages of the ten Member States which joined the European Union on 1 May 2004 (Czech, Estonian, Hungarian, Latvian, Lithuanian, Maltese, Polish, Slovenian and Slovak) should be added "as personnel, financial and time resources allow."

The site includes a keyword index and a glossary, with links to full text versions of Decisions, Directives, Regulations and Commission documents, and to other relevant sites.
