= European Broadcasting Area =

Region of the ITU

Current boundaries of the European Broadcasting Area in red

The European Broadcasting Area (EBA) is a geographical area defined by the International Telecommunication Union (ITU) for the purpose of coordinating broadcasting activity.

The EBA includes some territory outside of Europe (e.g. Southern Mediterranean), while excluding certain areas that are part of the European continent (e.g. large swathes of European Russia). After the EBA was expanded by the 2007 World Radiocommunication Conference (WRC-07), the only ITU member state with territory in Europe that remains outside the EBA is Kazakhstan (this area is known as European Kazakhstan).

The boundaries of the European Broadcasting Area have their origin in the regions served and linked by telegraphy cables in the 19th and early 20th centuries. The national broadcasters of most countries within the area are members of the European Broadcasting Union (EBU), which as of 2026 is made up of 115 member organisations from 57 countries as well as 31 associate members from a further 20 countries.

== List of countries and territories within the EBA ==
=== ITU member states ===
- Albania
- Algeria (Note: Partially outside the EBA.)
- Andorra
- Armenia
- Austria
- Azerbaijan
- Belarus
- Belgium
- Bosnia and Herzegovina
- Bulgaria
- Croatia
- Cyprus
- Czech Republic
- Denmark (Note: Greenland is outside the EBA.)
- Egypt
- Estonia
- Finland
- France (Note: Overseas regions and territories are outside the EBA.)
- Georgia
- Germany
- Greece
- Hungary
- Iceland
- Iraq
- Ireland
- Israel
- Italy
- Jordan
- Latvia
- Lebanon
- Libya
- Liechtenstein
- Lithuania
- Luxembourg
- Malta
- Moldova
- Monaco
- Montenegro
- Morocco
- Netherlands (Note: Caribbean Netherlands, Aruba, Curaçao and Sint Maarten are outside the EBA.)
- North Macedonia
- Norway (Note: Bouvet Island, Peter I Island and Queen Maud Land are outside the EBA.)
- Poland
- Portugal
- Romania
- Russia
- San Marino
- Saudi Arabia
- Serbia
- Slovakia
- Slovenia
- Spain (Note: The Canary Islands are outside the EBA.)
- Sweden
- Switzerland
- Syria
- Tunisia
- Turkey
- Ukraine
- United Kingdom (Note: The British Overseas Territories, except Akrotiri and Dhekelia and Gibraltar, are outside the EBA.)
- Vatican City

=== Former ITU member states ===
- Czechoslovakia
- East Germany
- Serbia and Montenegro
- Soviet Union
- Yugoslavia

=== Dependent territories and states with limited recognition ===
The following jurisdictions also rest inside the EBA borders, but cannot join the ITU due their dependent status or limited recognition:

Dependent territories

- Akrotiri and Dhekelia, overseas territory of the United Kingdom.
- Faroe Islands, constituent country of Denmark.
- Gibraltar, overseas territory of the United Kingdom.
- Guernsey, Crown dependency of the United Kingdom.
- Isle of Man, Crown dependency of the United Kingdom.
- Jersey, Crown dependency of the United Kingdom.

States with limited recognition

- Abkhazia, claimed as an autonomous republic of Georgia.
- Kosovo, claimed as an autonomous province of Serbia.
- Northern Cyprus occupied territory of Cyprus, claimed as part of Cyprus.
- Palestine, in conflict with Israel.
- South Ossetia, claimed as part of Georgia.
- Transnistria, claimed as a territorial unit of Moldova.

== See also ==
- International Telecommunication Union region
