= Regions of Europe =

Overview of European regional geography

Europe is often split into regions and subregions based on geographical, cultural or historical factors. Since there is no universal agreement on Europe's regional composition, the placement of individual countries may vary based on criteria being used. For instance, the Balkans is a distinct geographical region within Europe, but individual countries may alternatively be grouped into Central, Eastern, Southeastern, or Southern Europe.

Regional affiliation of countries may also evolve over time. Malta was considered an island of North Africa for centuries, but is now considered a part of Southern Europe. The exact placement of the Caucasus has also varied since classical antiquity and is now regarded by many as a distinct region within or partly in Europe. Greenland, and partially Iceland, is geographically a part of North America but has been politically and culturally influenced by Northern European countries for more than a millennium. As such, several regions are often included as belonging to a Greater Europe, including Anatolia, Cyprus, the South Caucasus, Siberia, Asian Kazakhstan (the part of Kazakhstan located east of European Kazakhstan), Greenland, as well as the overseas territories of EU member states.

== Subregions ==
Different views about regions of Europe

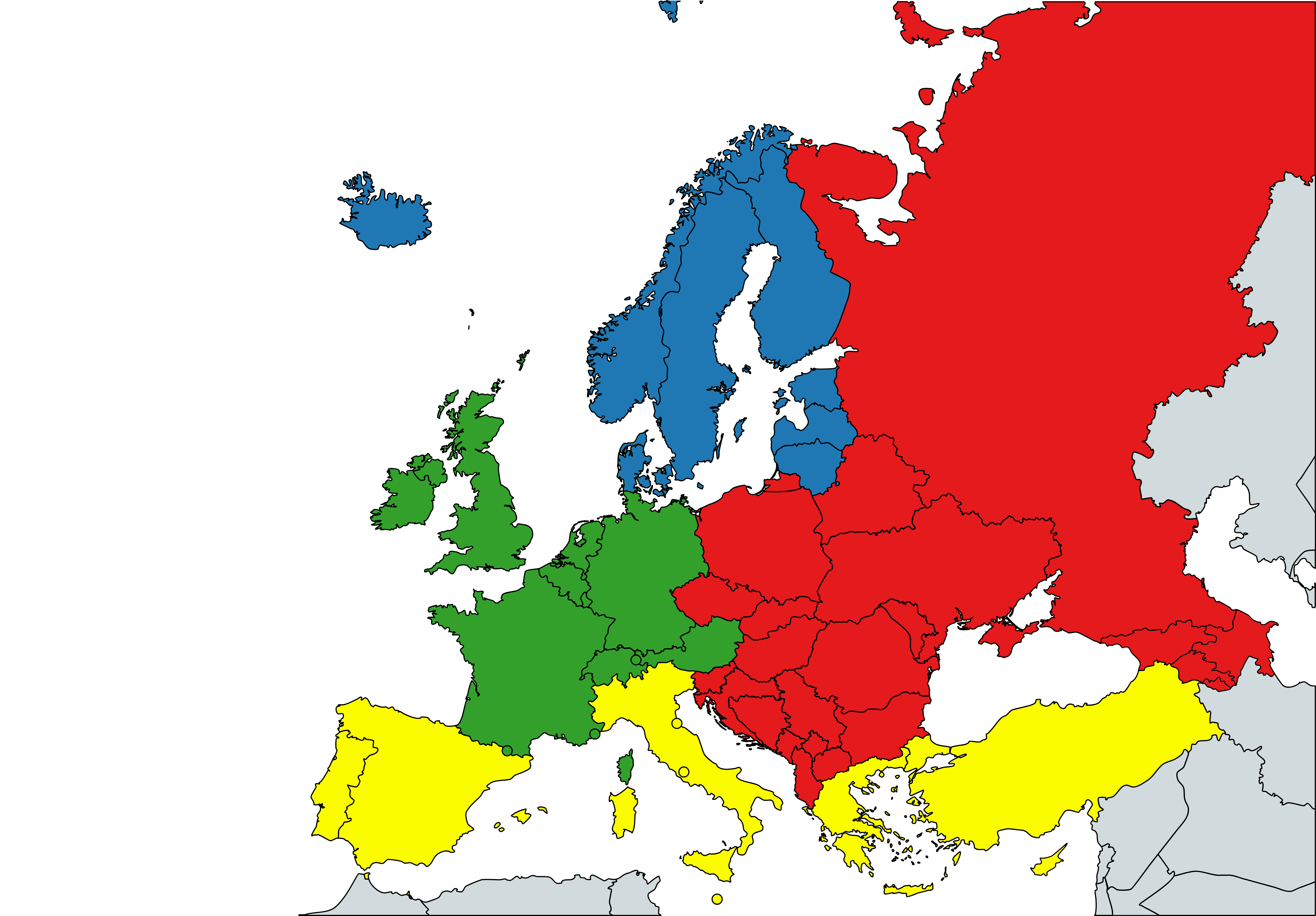
Regions of Europe according to EuroVoc:
Northern Europe
Central and Eastern Europe
Southern Europe
Western Europe

Subregions of Europe by the UN geoscheme:
Northern Europe
Eastern Europe
Southern Europe
Western Europe

Subregions of Europe based on The World Factbook:
Northern Europe
Eastern Europe
Southeastern Europe
Southern Europe
Southwestern Europe
Western Europe
Central Europe

Groupings by compass directions are the hardest to define in Europe, since there are a few calculations of the midpoint of Europe (among other issues), and the pure geographical criteria of "east" and "west" are often confused with the political meaning these words acquired during the Cold War era.

Some typical geographical subregions of Europe include:

- Central and Eastern Europe
  - Central Europe
  - Eastern Europe
- Northern Europe
  - Fennoscandia
  - Baltic region
  - Northwestern Europe
- Southern Europe
  - Italy (geographical region)
  - Southeastern Europe
  - Iberian Peninsula
- Western Europe
  - Northwestern Europe
  - Benelux

Note: There is no universally agreed definition for continental subregions. Depending on the source, some of the subregions, such as Central Europe or Southeastern Europe, can be listed as first-tier subregions. Some transregional countries, such as Romania or the United Kingdom, may be included in multiple subregions.

Common geopolitical subregions of Europe include:

Two Europes

- Old Europe and New Europe

Three Europes

- Eastern Europe
- East-Central Europe
- Western Europe

== Historical divisions ==
Europe can be divided along many differing historical lines, normally corresponding to those parts that were inside or outside a particular cultural phenomenon, empire or political division. The areas varied at different times, and so it is arguable as to which were part of some common historical entity (e.g., were Germany or Britain part of Roman Europe as they were only partly and relatively briefly part of the Empire—or were the countries of the former communist Yugoslavia part of the Eastern Bloc, since it was not in the Warsaw Pact).

- Greek East and Latin West: those parts that fell into the eastern (Byzantine) and Western Roman Empires.
- Catholic and Eastern Orthodoxy in Europe: those parts on either side of the Great Schism.
- After Reformation: countries of Western Christianity (Catholic and Protestant Churches) and Eastern Christianity (Eastern Orthodox Church, Assyrian Church of the East, Oriental Orthodox churches and the Eastern Catholic Churches)
  - Protestant and Catholic Europe: those parts that, in the main, left the Catholic Church during the Reformation contrasted with those that did not.
- Communist Europe (Eastern Bloc), Capitalist Europe (Western Bloc): those parts on either side of the Iron Curtain and third world countries (neutral and non-aligned during the Cold War).

== Contemporary ==
A clickable Euler diagram showing the relationships between various European regional organisations

=== Economic and political ===
European Single Market integration: European Union member states form the European Single Market Non-EU states that participate in the EU Single Market with exceptions: Iceland, Liechtenstein, Norway and Switzerland (see also EFTA) Part of a former EU state that remains partially aligned to the EU Single Market on goods: Northern Ireland in the United Kingdom (see also Brexit and the Irish border) Non-EU states with a Stabilisation and Association Agreement with the EU allowing for participation in selected sectors of the Single Market: EU accession candidates Albania, Montenegro, North Macedonia and Serbia; EU accession potential candidates: Bosnia and Herzegovina and Kosovo Non-EU states with a Deep and Comprehensive Free Trade Area agreement with the EU allowing for participation in selected sectors of the Single Market: Georgia, Moldova and Ukraine Non-EU states which have a bilateral Customs Union arrangement with the EU: Turkey (an accession candidate), Andorra, Monaco and San Marino

- European Union (EU)

Countries that are member states of the political and economic bloc (27 as of 2024):
Austria, Belgium, Bulgaria, Croatia, Cyprus, Czech Republic, Denmark, Estonia, Finland, France, Germany, Greece, Hungary, Ireland, Italy, Latvia, Lithuania, Luxembourg, Malta, the Netherlands, Poland, Portugal, Romania, Slovakia, Slovenia, Spain, and Sweden.

- EU Med Group

An alliance of Mediterranean countries within EU:
Croatia, Cyprus, France, Greece, Italy, Malta, Portugal, Slovenia, and Spain.

- Eurozone

Countries that have adopted the euro as their currency:
Andorra, Austria, Belgium, Bulgaria, Croatia, Cyprus, Estonia, Finland, France, Germany, Greece, Ireland, Italy, Latvia, Lithuania, Luxembourg, Malta, Monaco, the Netherlands, Portugal, San Marino, Slovakia, Slovenia, Spain, and Vatican City.

- European Free Trade Association (EFTA)

A free trade organisation that operates in parallel with, and is linked by treaties to, the EU:
Liechtenstein, Iceland, Norway, and Switzerland.

- Central European Free Trade Agreement (CEFTA)

A free trade agreement among non-EU members:
Albania, Bosnia and Herzegovina, Kosovo (represented by UNMIK), Moldova, Montenegro, North Macedonia, and Serbia.

- Schengen Area

A borderless zone created by the Schengen Agreements, comprising:
Austria, Belgium, Bulgaria, Croatia, Czech Republic, Denmark, Estonia, Finland, France, Germany, Greece, Hungary, Italy, Latvia, Lithuania, Luxembourg, Malta, the Netherlands, Poland, Portugal, Romania, Slovakia, Slovenia, Spain, Sweden; in addition, by separate agreements Norway, Iceland, Liechtenstein, and Switzerland fully apply the provisions of the Schengen acquis.

- European Union Customs Union

A customs union of all the member states of the European Union (EU) and some neighbouring countries:
Austria, Belgium, Bulgaria, Croatia, Cyprus, the Czech Republic, Denmark, Estonia, Finland, France, Germany, Greece, Hungary, Ireland, Italy, Latvia, Lithuania, Luxembourg, Malta, Monaco, the Netherlands, Poland, Portugal, Romania, Slovakia, Slovenia, Spain, Sweden. Andorra, San Marino, and Turkey are each in customs union with the EU's customs territory.

- Eurasian Economic Union (EAEU)

An economic union of Armenia, Belarus, Kazakhstan, Kyrgyzstan, and Russia. Moldova and Uzbekistan hold observer status.

- Commonwealth of Independent States Free Trade Area

A free trade agreement among the members of the Commonwealth of Independent States: Armenia, Belarus, Kazakhstan, Kyrgyzstan, Moldova, Russia, and Tajikistan.

- Organization of the Black Sea Economic Cooperation

A forum of regional economic cooperation:
Albania, Armenia, Azerbaijan, Bulgaria, Georgia, Greece, Moldova, Romania, Russia, Serbia, Turkey, and Ukraine.

=== Other political ===
Members of the Eastern Partnership

- Council of Europe

An international organisation whose stated aim is to uphold human rights, democracy, and the rule of law in Europe, and to promote European culture.
It has 46 member states, with approximately 820 million people.

- Eastern European Group

One of five United Nations regional groups
Albania, Armenia, Azerbaijan, Belarus, Bosnia and Herzegovina, Bulgaria, Croatia, Czech Republic, Estonia, Georgia, Hungary, Latvia, Lithuania, Moldova, Montenegro, North Macedonia, Poland, Romania, Russia, Serbia, Slovakia, Slovenia, and Ukraine.

- Eastern Partnership and the Euronest Parliamentary Assembly

A group of former Soviet Eastern European countries cooperating with the EU:
Armenia, Azerbaijan, Belarus, Georgia, Moldova, and Ukraine.

- European Political Community

An intergovernmental forum for political and strategic discussions about the future of Europe, with participants from 47 European countries.

- OECD Europe countries

European countries that are a part of the OECD:
Austria, Belgium, the Czech Republic, Denmark, Estonia, Finland, France, Germany, Greece, Hungary, Iceland, Ireland, Italy, Latvia, Lithuania, Luxembourg, the Netherlands, Norway, Poland, Portugal, Slovenia, Slovakia, Spain, Sweden, Switzerland, Turkey, and the United Kingdom.

- Central European Initiative

A forum of regional cooperation including:
Albania, Austria, Belarus, Bosnia and Herzegovina, Bulgaria, Croatia, the Czech Republic, Hungary, Italy, Moldova, Montenegro, North Macedonia, Poland, Romania, Serbia, Slovakia, Slovenia, and Ukraine.

- Southeast European Cooperative Initiative

An organization promoting regional cooperation, including:
Albania, Bosnia and Herzegovina, Bulgaria, Croatia, Greece, Hungary, Moldova, Montenegro, North Macedonia, Romania, Serbia, Slovenia, and Turkey.

- Community for Democracy and Rights of Nations

A group of former Soviet disputed states in Eastern Europe:
Abkhazia, South Ossetia, and Transnistria.

- Organization for Security and Co-operation in Europe

The world's largest security-oriented intergovernmental organization, with 57 participating states mostly in the Northern Hemisphere.

- Visegrád Group

A cultural and political alliance of four Central European states for the purposes of furthering their European integration, as well as for advancing military, economic and energy cooperation with one another:
Poland, Czech Republic, Slovakia, and Hungary.

- Centrope

An Interreg IIIA project to establish a multinational region in Central Europe encompassing four European countries: Slovakia, Austria, Hungary, and the Czech Republic.

- Middleeuropean Initiative

Promotes Central European cooperation.

- Three Seas Initiative

=== Geographical ===
==== Peninsulas ====
- Apennine Peninsula (Italian Peninsula)

Located in the south of Europe, the Apennine Peninsula contains the states of Italy, San Marino, and Vatican City

- Balkan Peninsula

The Balkan Peninsula is located in Southeastern Europe and the following countries and territories occupy land on the peninsula either exclusively or partially:
Albania, Bosnia and Herzegovina, Bulgaria, Croatia (approximately the southern half), Greece, Kosovo, Montenegro, North Macedonia, Romania (the Dobrudja region), Serbia, Slovenia (the coastal section), and Turkey (East Thrace)

- Fennoscandian Peninsula

Located in the north of Europe, including Finland, Norway, Sweden, and part of Russia

- Iberian Peninsula

Located in Southwestern Europe, this peninsula contains Andorra, Gibraltar, Portugal, Spain, and a small part of France

- Jutland Peninsula

Jutland of Denmark (main part of the country excluding its islands) and the Schleswig-Holstein region of Germany

- Scandinavian Peninsula

Located in the north of Europe, including Norway, Sweden, and part of Finland

==== Regional ====
- Atlantic Europe
  - United Kingdom, Ireland, Iceland, Belgium, the Netherlands, Portugal, Spain, France, western Scandinavia and Germany.
- Alpine countries

States that occupy the Alps:
Austria, Switzerland, Liechtenstein, Slovenia, Germany, France, and Italy

- Balkans region

In its broadest sense, encompasses Albania, Bosnia and Herzegovina, Bulgaria, Croatia, Greece, Hungary, Kosovo, Moldova, Montenegro, North Macedonia, Romania, Serbia, Slovenia and European Turkey

- Baltic Rim region

Denmark, Estonia, Finland, Germany, Latvia, Lithuania, Poland, Russia, and Sweden
- The term Baltic states emerged after World War I referring to the new sovereign states that emerged on the east coast of the Baltic Sea: Finland, Estonia, Latvia, and Lithuania. Since World War II, the term has been used for just Estonia, Latvia, and Lithuania.

- British Isles

Guernsey, The Isle of Man, the Republic of Ireland, Jersey and the United Kingdom

- Carpathian states

Czech Republic, Hungary, Poland, Romania, Serbia, Slovakia, and Ukraine

- Caucasus

Armenia, Azerbaijan, Georgia, and Russia; also the disputed territories of Abkhazia, and South Ossetia

- Channel Islands

Guernsey and Jersey

- Low Countries

Belgium, Luxembourg, the Netherlands, parts of France, and parts of Germany
- Benelux: Belgium, the Netherlands, and Luxembourg

- Nordic countries

Sweden, Norway, Finland, Denmark, Greenland, and Iceland
- Scandinavia: Sweden, Norway, Denmark
- Fennoscandia: Finland, Sweden, Norway and Karelia; a geological region defined by the Fennoscandian shield

- Danubian countries

States that lie along the River Danube:
Austria, Bulgaria, Croatia, Germany, Hungary, Moldova, Romania, Serbia, Slovakia, and Ukraine

- Dinaric Alps

Slovenia, Croatia, Bosnia and Herzegovina, Montenegro, Albania
Serbia, Kosovo and Italy occupy a small portion of the Dinaric Alps.

- Macaronesia

Chain of Islands in the North Atlantic
Azores, Canary Islands, Madeira; also including Cape Verde, an independent African nation.

- Mediterranean countries

Mediterranean nations are European countries on the Mediterranean Basin:
Portugal, Spain, France, Monaco, Italy, Slovenia, San Marino, Croatia, Bosnia and Herzegovina, Montenegro, Albania, Greece, Turkey, Cyprus, Malta, and the British territory of Gibraltar
- Adriatic region: Italy, Slovenia, Croatia, Bosnia and Herzegovina, Montenegro, Albania

- Black Sea region

The Black Sea nations (although some sections lie within Asia) are:
Abkhazia (de facto state), Bulgaria, Georgia, Romania, Russia, Turkey, and Ukraine

- Caspian Sea region

The world's largest lake which forms a section of the Asian-European border has five countries occupying its shore. Iran and Turkmenistan lie entirely within Asia while the following countries are transcontinental and have sovereignty over the Caspian Sea's European sector:
Azerbaijan, Kazakhstan, and Russia

=== Other groupings ===
- Blue Banana: describing the concentration of the wealth/economic productivity of Europe in a banana-shaped band running from north west England, London, through Benelux, eastern France, western Germany to northern Italy.

== See also ==
- Assembly of European Regions
- Enlargement of the European Union
- European integration
- Geography of Europe
- Politics of Europe
- Politics of the European Union
- Potential enlargement of the European Union
- United Nations geoscheme for Europe
