= Western Europe =

Subregion of the European continent

Western Europe is the western region of Europe. The region's extent varies depending on context. The concept of "the West" appeared in Europe in juxtaposition to "the East" and originally applied to the Western half of the ancient Mediterranean world, the Latin West of the Roman Empire, and "Western Christendom". Beginning with the Renaissance and the Age of Discovery, roughly from the 15th century, the concept of Europe as "the West" slowly became distinguished from and eventually replaced the dominant use of "Christendom" as the preferred endonym within the area. By the Age of Enlightenment and the Industrial Revolution, the concepts of "Eastern Europe" and "Western Europe" were more regularly used. The distinctiveness of Western Europe became most apparent during the Cold War, when Europe was divided for 46 years by the Iron Curtain (1945–1991) into the Western Bloc by the US-led NATO and the Eastern Bloc by the Soviet-led Warsaw Pact between the two global superpowers, each characterised by distinct political and economical systems.

== Historical divisions ==
=== Classical antiquity and medieval origins ===
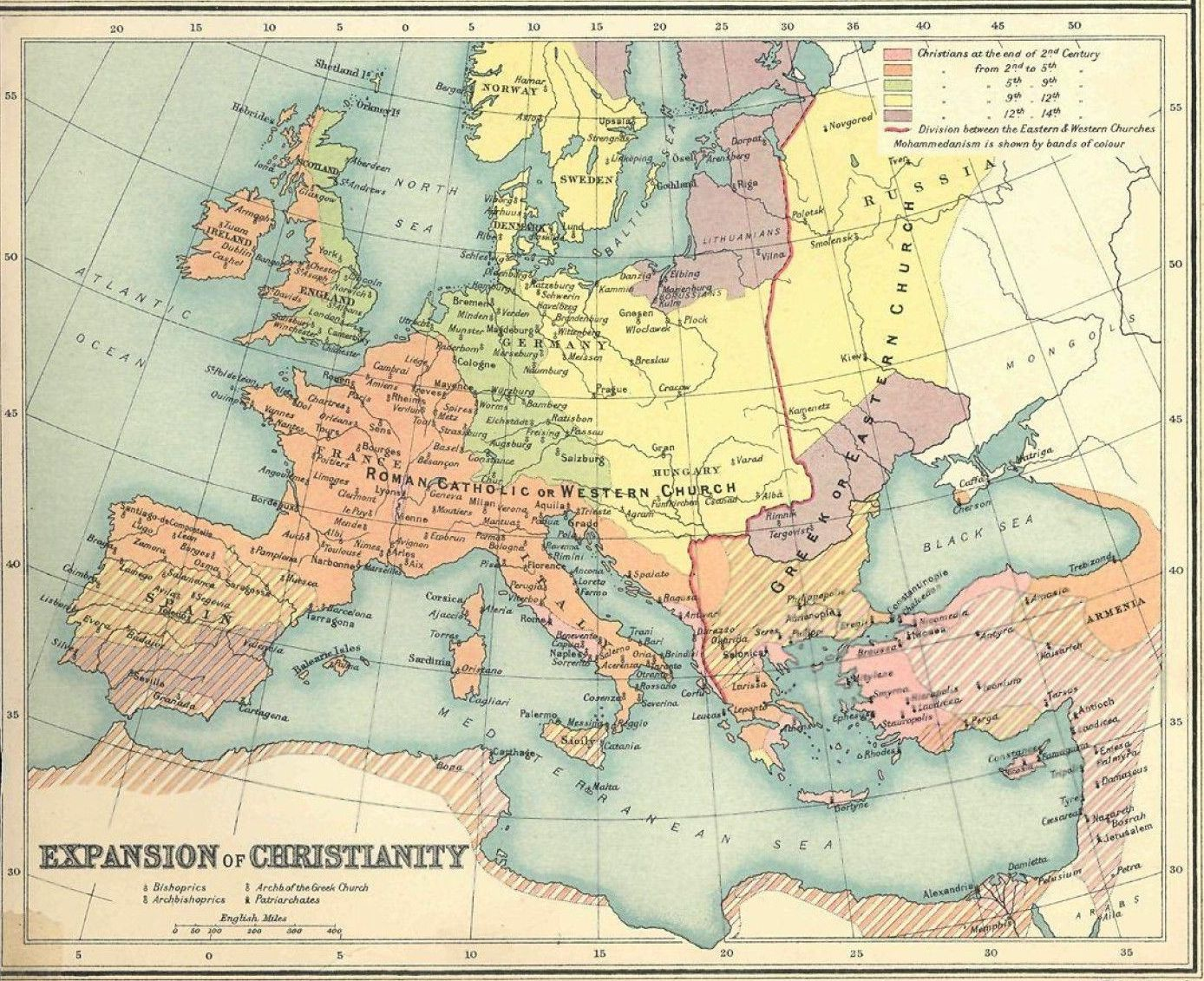
Schism of 1054 (East–West Schism) in Christianity

Prior to the Roman conquest, a large part of Western Europe had adopted the newly developed La Tène culture. As the Roman domain expanded, a cultural and linguistic division appeared between the mainly Greek-speaking eastern provinces, which had formed the highly urbanised Hellenistic civilisation, and the western territories, which in contrast largely adopted the Latin language. This cultural and linguistic division was eventually reinforced by the later political east–west division of the Roman Empire. The Western Roman Empire and the Eastern Roman Empire controlled the two divergent regions between the 3rd and the 5th centuries.

The division between these two was enhanced during late antiquity and the Middle Ages by a number of events. The Western Roman Empire collapsed, starting the Early Middle Ages. By contrast, the Eastern Roman Empire, mostly known as the Greek or Byzantine Empire, survived and even thrived for another 1000 years. The rise of the Carolingian Empire in the west, and in particular the Great Schism between Eastern Orthodoxy and Roman Catholicism, enhanced the cultural and religious distinctiveness between Eastern and Western Europe.

After the conquest of the Byzantine Empire, center of the Eastern Orthodox Church, by the Muslim Ottoman Empire in the 15th century, and the gradual fragmentation of the Holy Roman Empire (which had replaced the Carolingian Empire), the division between Roman Catholic and Protestant became more important in Europe than that with Eastern Orthodoxy.

In East Asia, Western Europe was historically known as taixi in China and taisei in Japan, which literally translates as the "Far West". The term Far West became synonymous with Western Europe in China during the Ming dynasty. The Italian Jesuit priest Matteo Ricci was one of the first writers in China to use the Far West as an Asian counterpart to the European concept of the Far East. In Ricci's writings, Ricci referred to himself as "Matteo of the Far West". The term was still in use in the late 19th and early 20th centuries.

=== Religion ===
Christianity is the largest religion in Western Europe. According to a 2018 study by the Pew Research Center, 71.0% of Western Europeans identified as Christians.

In 1054, the East–West Schism divided Christianity into Western Christianity and Eastern Christianity. This split Europe in two, with Western Europe primarily under the Catholic Church, and much of Eastern Europe under the Eastern Orthodox Church. Ever since the Reformation in the 16th century, Protestantism has also been a major denomination in Europe, mostly in the West.

=== Cold War ===
Political spheres of influence in Europe during the Cold War; neutral countries (shaded grey) considered informally Western-oriented but not formally aligned to the West

During the four decades of the Cold War, the definition of East and West was simplified by the existence of the Eastern Bloc. A number of historians and social scientists view the Cold War definition of Western and Eastern Europe as outdated or relegating.

During the final stages of World War II, the future of Europe was decided between the Allies in the 1945 Yalta Conference, between the British prime minister, Winston Churchill, the U.S. president, Franklin D. Roosevelt, and the Premier of the Soviet Union, Joseph Stalin.

Post-war Europe was divided into two major spheres: the Western Bloc, influenced by the United States, and the Eastern Bloc, influenced by the Soviet Union. With the onset of the Cold War, Europe was divided by the Iron Curtain. This term had been used during World War II by German Propaganda Minister Joseph Goebbels and, later, Count Lutz Schwerin von Krosigk in the last days of the war; however, its use was hugely popularised by Winston Churchill, who used it in his famous "Sinews of Peace" address on 5 March 1946 at Westminster College in Fulton, Missouri:

From Stettin in the Baltic to Trieste in the Adriatic an iron curtain has descended across the Continent. Behind that line lie all the capitals of the ancient states of Central and Eastern Europe. Warsaw, Berlin, Prague, Vienna, Budapest, Belgrade, Bucharest and Sofia; all these famous cities and the populations around them lie in what I must call the Soviet sphere, and all are subject, in one form or another, not only to Soviet influence but to a very high and in some cases increasing measure of control from Moscow.

Although some countries were officially neutral, they were classified according to the nature of their political and economic systems. This division largely defines the popular perception and understanding of Western Europe and its borders with Eastern Europe on the east side. On the western side is the Atlantic ocean.

The world changed dramatically with the fall of the Iron Curtain in 1989. West Germany peacefully absorbed East Germany, in the German reunification. Comecon and the Warsaw Pact were dissolved, and in 1991, the Soviet Union ceased to exist. Several countries which had been part of the Soviet Union regained full independence.

=== Western European Union ===
Member states of the Western European Union (1995–2011)

In 1948 the Treaty of Brussels was signed between Belgium, France, Luxembourg, the Netherlands and the United Kingdom. It was further revisited in 1954 at the Paris Conference, when the Western European Union was established. It was declared defunct in 2011 after the Treaty of Lisbon, and the Treaty of Brussels was terminated. When the Western European Union was dissolved, it had 10 member countries. Additionally, it had 6 associate member countries, 7 associate partner countries and 5 observer countries.

== Modern divisions ==
=== UN geoscheme classification ===
Subregions of Europe by United Nations geoscheme: Eastern Europe Northern Europe Southern Europe Western Europe

The United Nations geoscheme is a system devised by the United Nations Statistics Division (UNSD) which divides the countries of the world into regional and subregional groups, based on the M49 coding classification. The partition is for statistical convenience and does not imply any assumption regarding political or other affiliation of countries or territories.

In the UN geoscheme, the following countries are classified as Western Europe:

- Austria
- Belgium
- France
- Germany
- Liechtenstein
- Luxembourg
- Monaco
- Netherlands
- Switzerland

=== CIA classification ===
Regions of Europe based on CIA World Factbook: Northern Europe Western Europe Central Europe Southwest Europe Southern Europe Southeast Europe Eastern Europe

The CIA classifies seven countries as belonging to "Western Europe":

- Belgium
- France
- Ireland
- Luxembourg
- Monaco
- Netherlands
- United Kingdom

The CIA also classifies three countries as belonging to "Southwestern Europe":

- Andorra
- Portugal
- Spain

=== EuroVoc classification ===
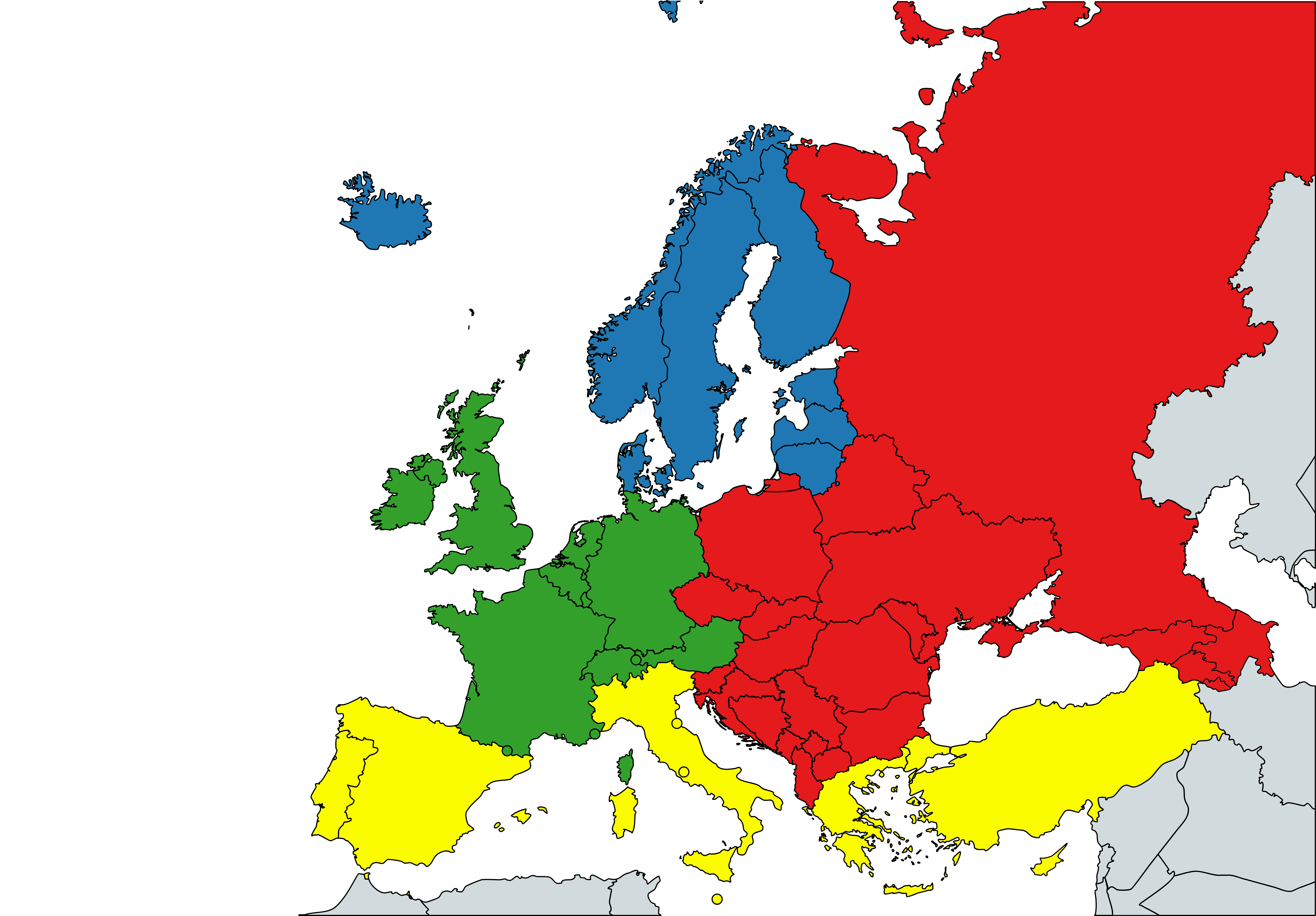
European sub-regions according to EuroVoc: Northern Europe Western Europe Southern Europe Central and Eastern Europe

EuroVoc is a multilingual thesaurus maintained by the Publications Office of the European Union. In this thesaurus, the countries of Europe are grouped into sub-regions. The following countries are included in the sub-group Western Europe:

- Andorra
- Austria
- Belgium
- France
- Germany
- Ireland
- Liechtenstein
- Luxembourg
- Monaco
- Netherlands
- Switzerland
- United Kingdom

=== UN regional groups: Western European and Others Group ===
WEOG member and observer states

The Western European and Others Group is one of several unofficial Regional Groups in the United Nations that act as voting blocs and negotiation forums. Regional voting blocs were formed in 1961 to encourage voting to various UN bodies from different regional groups. The European members of the group are:

- Andorra
- Austria
- Belgium
- Denmark
- Finland
- France
- Germany
- Greece
- Iceland
- Ireland
- Italy
- Liechtenstein
- Luxembourg
- Malta
- Monaco
- Netherlands
- Norway
- Portugal
- San Marino
- Spain
- Sweden
- Switzerland
- Turkey
- United Kingdom

In addition, Australia, Canada, Israel and New Zealand are members of the group, with the United States as observer.

== Population ==
Using the CIA classification strictly would give the following calculation of Western Europe's population. All figures based on the projections for 2018 by the Population Division of the United Nations Department of Economic and Social Affairs.

Rank	Country or territory	Population (most recent estimates)	Languages	Capital
1	United Kingdom	66,040,229	English	London
2	France (metropolitan)	65,058,000	French	Paris
3	Netherlands	17,889,600	Dutch, Frisian	Amsterdam^{1}
4	Belgium	11,420,163	Dutch, French and German	Brussels
5	Ireland	5,123,536	English, Irish	Dublin
6	Luxembourg	602,005	French, Luxembourgish and German	Luxembourg City
7	Monaco	38,300	French	Monaco (city-state)
Total		165,265,329		

Using the CIA classification a little more liberally and including "South-Western Europe", would give the following calculation of Western Europe's population.

Rank	Country or territory	Population (most recent estimates)	Languages	Capital
1	United Kingdom	66,040,229	English	London
2	France (metropolitan)	65,058,000	French	Paris
3	Spain	46,700,000	Spanish	Madrid
4	Netherlands	17,889,600	Dutch, Frisian	Amsterdam^{1}
5	Belgium	11,420,163	Dutch, French and German	Brussels
6	Portugal	10,291,027	Portuguese	Lisbon
7	Ireland	5,123,536	English, Irish	Dublin
8	Luxembourg	602,005	French, Luxembourgish and German	Luxembourg City
9	Andorra	78,264	French, Spanish and Catalan	Andorra la Vella
10	Monaco	38,300	French	Monaco (city-state)
Total		222,293,922		

^{1} The Hague is the seat of government

== Climate ==
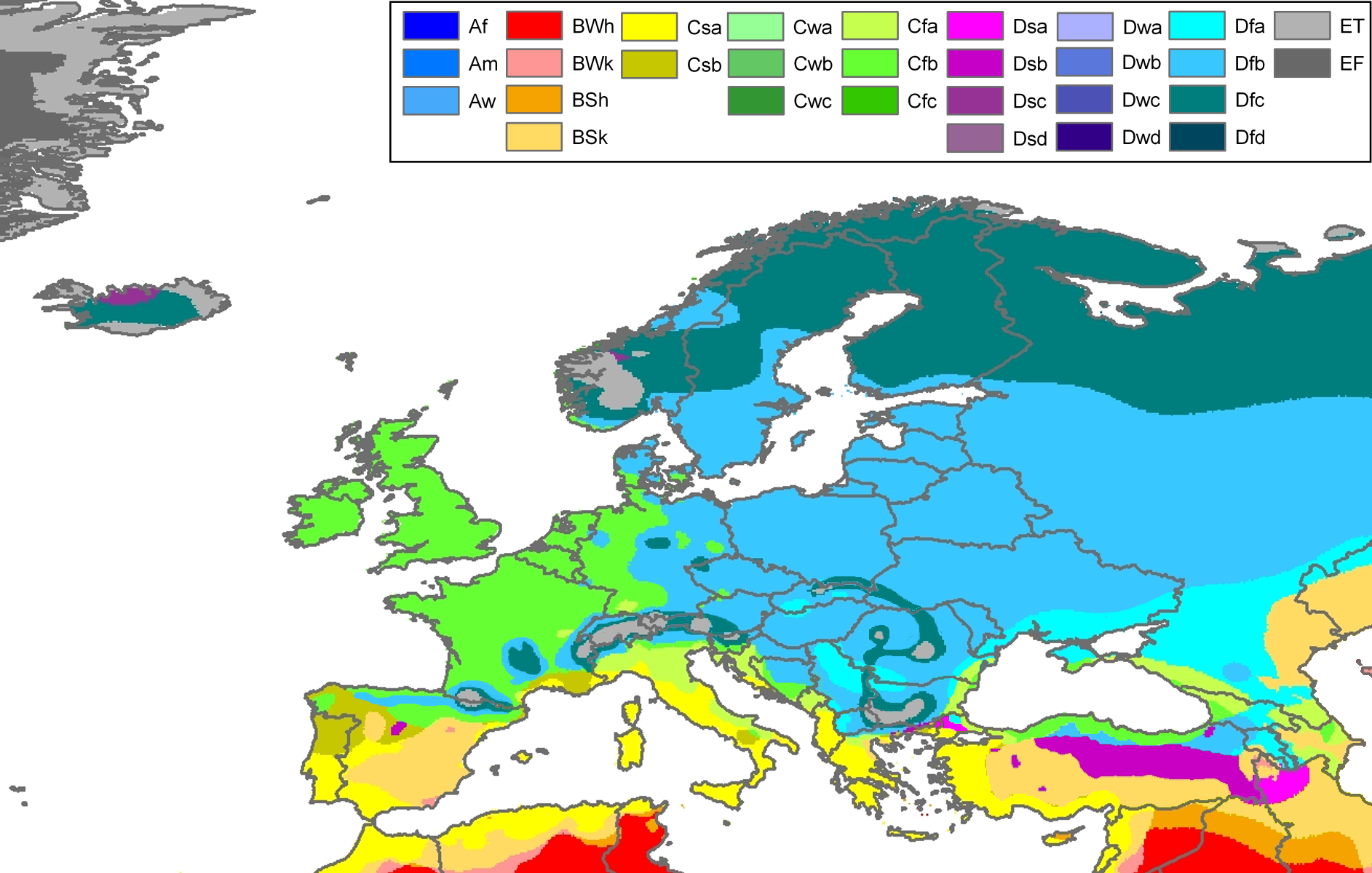
European climate. The Köppen-Geiger climates map is presented by the Climatic Research Unit of the University of East Anglia and the Global Precipitation Climatology Center of the Deutscher Wetterdienst.

The climate of Western Europe varies from Mediterranean in the coasts of Italy, Portugal and Spain to alpine in the Pyrenees and the Alps. The Mediterranean climate of the south is dry and warm. The western and northwestern parts have a mild, generally humid climate, influenced by the North Atlantic Current. Western Europe is a heatwave hotspot, exhibiting upward trends that are three-to-four times faster compared to the rest of the northern midlatitudes.

== Languages ==
Western European languages mostly fall within two Indo-European language families: the Romance languages, descended from the Latin of the Roman Empire; and the Germanic languages, whose ancestor language (Proto-Germanic) came from southern Scandinavia. Romance languages are spoken primarily in the southern and central part of Western Europe, Germanic languages in the northern part (the British Isles and the Low Countries), as well as a large part of Northern and Central Europe.

Other Western European languages include the Celtic group (that is, Irish, Scottish Gaelic, Manx, Welsh, Cornish and Breton) and Basque, the only currently living Old European language isolate.

Multilingualism and the protection of regional and minority languages are recognised political goals in Western Europe today. The Council of Europe Framework Convention for the Protection of National Minorities and the Council of Europe's European Charter for Regional or Minority Languages set up a legal framework for language rights in Europe.

== Economy ==
Western Europe is one of the richest regions of the world. Germany has the highest gross domestic product in Europe and the largest financial surplus of any country, Luxembourg has the world's highest GDP per capita, and Germany has the highest net national wealth of any European state.

Switzerland and Luxembourg have the highest average wage in the world, in nominal and PPP, respectively. Norway ranks highest in the world on the Social Progress Index.

== See also ==
- Atlantic Europe
- Central Europe
- Eastern Europe
- Northern Europe
- Southern Europe
- Far West
- Marshall Plan
- EuroVoc § Western Europe
- Western world
