= Austrian language =

Austrian language may refer to:

- Austrian German, the variety of Standard German written and spoken in Austria
- One of the other Languages of Austria
