= Languages of Austria =

- Official: German
- Recognised: Austrian German, Alemannic; Bavarian
- Regional: Croatian (Burgenland), Czech, Hungarian, Polish, Romani, Italian, Serbian, Slovak, Slovene, and Yiddish (historically)
- Minority: Bosnian, Serbian, Turkish
- Foreign: English (73%); French (11%); Italian (9%)
- Signed: Austrian Sign Language
- Keyboard layout: QWERTZ
- Source: ebs_386_en.pdf (europa.eu)

The languages of Austria include German, the official language and lingua franca; Austro-Bavarian, the main dialect outside Vorarlberg; Alemannic, the main dialect in Vorarlberg; and several minority languages.

== Standard German ==
German is the national official language and constitutes a lingua franca and de facto first language: most Austrians other than (mostly rural) seniors are able to speak it. It is the language used in media, in schools, and formal announcements. The variety of German used, Austrian German, is partially influenced by Austro-Bavarian.

== Alemannic ==
Alemannic, i.e., Swiss German, is spoken by about 300,000 people, mostly in Vorarlberg. Vorarlberg uses a High Alemannic, the same dialect group as that spoken in Northern Switzerland (outside Basel) and parts of southern Alsace, France. To most German-speakers, it is very difficult to understand.

== Austro-Bavarian ==
The main native language of Austria outside Vorarlberg is Austro-Bavarian. It has approximately 8.3 million speakers in Austria. The north-eastern parts of Austria (with the capital Vienna) speak Central Austro-Bavarian dialects and the southern parts Southern Austro-Bavarian dialects.

Austro-Bavarian differs greatly from Standard German, making it very difficult for German speakers of different regions to understand the native population.

Austro-Bavarian has no official orthography, but there are literary efforts (de:Dialektliteratur), especially in poems, to depict the sound of the pronunciation in the spelling. Other words can only be heard while visiting particular regions of Austria and Bavaria; such words/phrases are only rarely used in Standard German. These include Griaß God (literally: 'greet God' = 'may God greet you'), and Servus/Servas 'at your service' as greeting phrases. Other terms are strictly dialectal, like Pfiat di / Pfiat eich (euch) (literally: 'watch over you [God]' = 'may God watch over you'), meaning 'goodbye'.

== Minority languages ==
A number of minority languages are spoken in Austria, some of which have official status. According to the European Commission, Austria's "recognized minority languages are Hungarian, Slovenian, Burgenland-Croatian, Czech, Slovak, Romany and sign language. In the mixed-language districts of Carinthia, Slovene is also considered an official language. In some districts of Burgenland, Hungarian and Croatian have equal status to German as an official language." About 250 languages are spoken throughout Austria, though many have very small populations of speakers. Only about 20 languages (apart from official languages of Austria) have more than 10,000 speakers.

Non-Official Languages with 10,000+ speakers in Austria (2021)
Language	Number of speakers (in Austria)
French*	1,181,300 (L1: 11,300)
Italian*	795,900 (L1: 11,900)
Spanish*	302,100 (L1: 11,100)
Russian*	150,000 (L1: 9,390)
Serbo-Croatian	381,800
Turkish	204,000
Hungarian	45,100
Polish	34,000
Albanian (Gheg)	31,400
Albanian (Tosk)	28,200
Slovene	27,600
Burgenland Croatian	21,600
Czech	19,700
Arabic (Levantine)	19,600
Romanian	18,800
Persian (Iranian)	11,900
Slovak	11,400
Chinese (Mandarin)	11,100

=== Serbo-Croatian ===
Serbo-Croatian is the largest minority language in Austria, spoken by more than 4% of the population.

=== Turkish ===
Turkish is the second largest minority language, in a situation almost mirroring that of Germany, spoken by 2.3% of the population.

=== Romanian ===
In 2021, Ethnologue reports there were an estimated 18,800 Romanian speakers in Austria.

=== Burgenland Croatian ===
Burgenland Croatian, an official language in Austrian Burgenland, is spoken by 2.5% of Austrians, and Burgenland Croats are recognized as a minority and have enjoyed special rights following the Austrian State Treaty (Staatsvertrag) of 1955.

=== Hungarian ===
While little spoken today, Hungarian has traditionally held an important position in Austria due to the historical ties between the two countries. Today, Hungarian is spoken by around 1,000 people in Burgenland.

=== Slovene ===
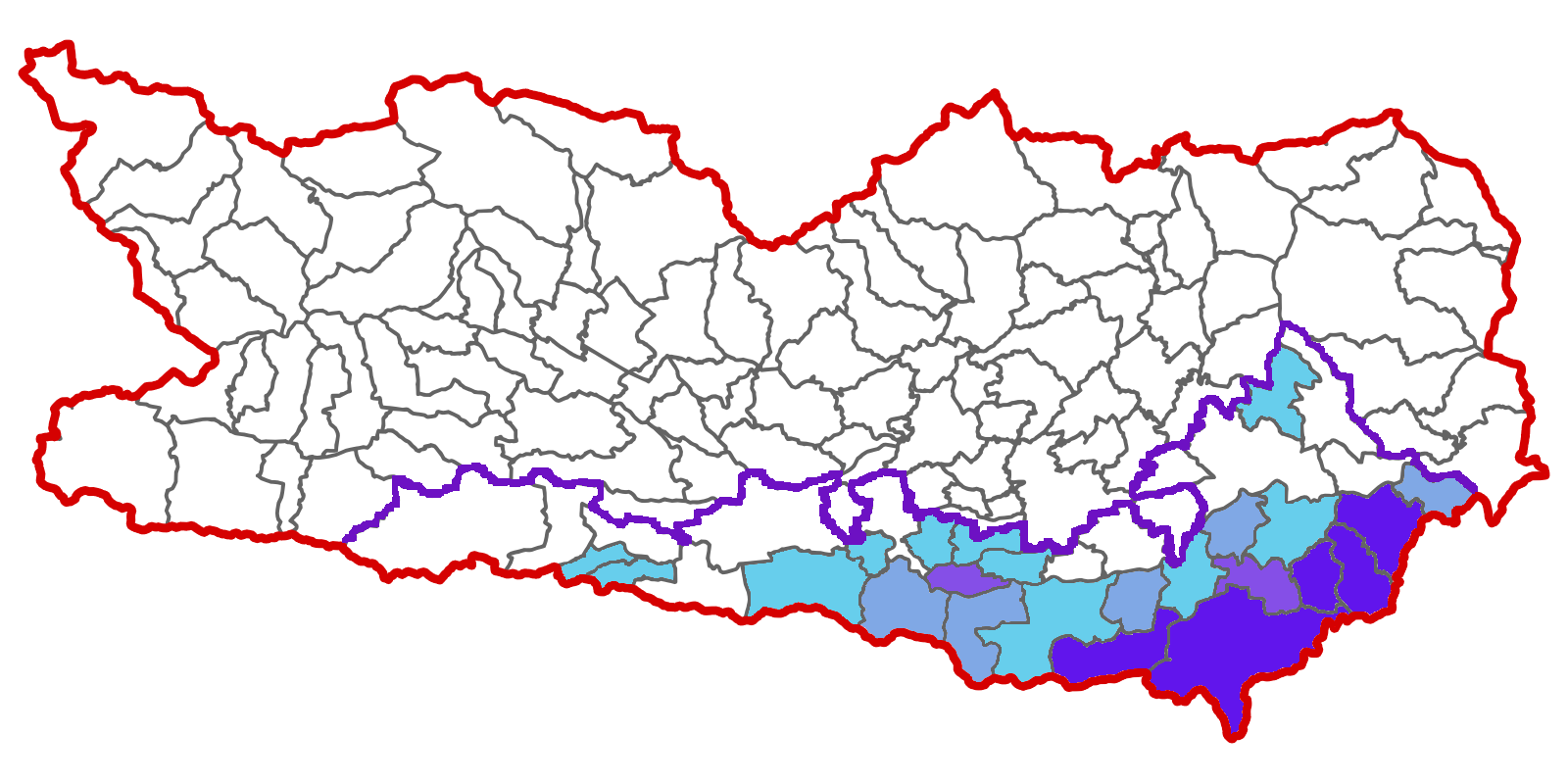
Areas in Carinthia where Slovene is spoken by above 5% (light-blue) to above 30% (dark-blue) of the population.

Slovene is an official language in Austrian Carinthia. As of the census in 2001 Slovene is used by 12,686 Austrians as vernacular, and it is reported that Slovene can be spoken by 0.3% of Austrians. Carinthian Slovenes are recognized as a minority and have enjoyed special rights and affirmative action following the Austrian State Treaty (Staatsvertrag) of 1955.

== European Charter for Regional or Minority Languages ==
Austria ratified the European Charter for Regional or Minority Languages on 28 June 2001 for the following languages in respect of specific Länder:

- Croatian of Burgenland
- Slovene (in Carinthia and Styria)
- Hungarian (in Burgenland and Vienna)
- Czech (in Vienna)
- Slovak (in Vienna)
- Romani (in Burgenland)

== English ==
English has long had a certain prestige in Austria and is therefore taught from a very early age. Although it is only compulsory from secondary level I onwards, many pupils are enrolled in English courses and similar programmes before that. Since English is considered a major subject in the Austrian school system and is also highly valued in higher general education colleges (AHS) and higher technical college (BHS) schools, Austria has been at the top of the list of countries with the ‘best’ English for years. In 2025, Austria ranked third in the EF English Proficiency Index with 616 points, just behind the Netherlands with 624 points and Croatia with 617 points.

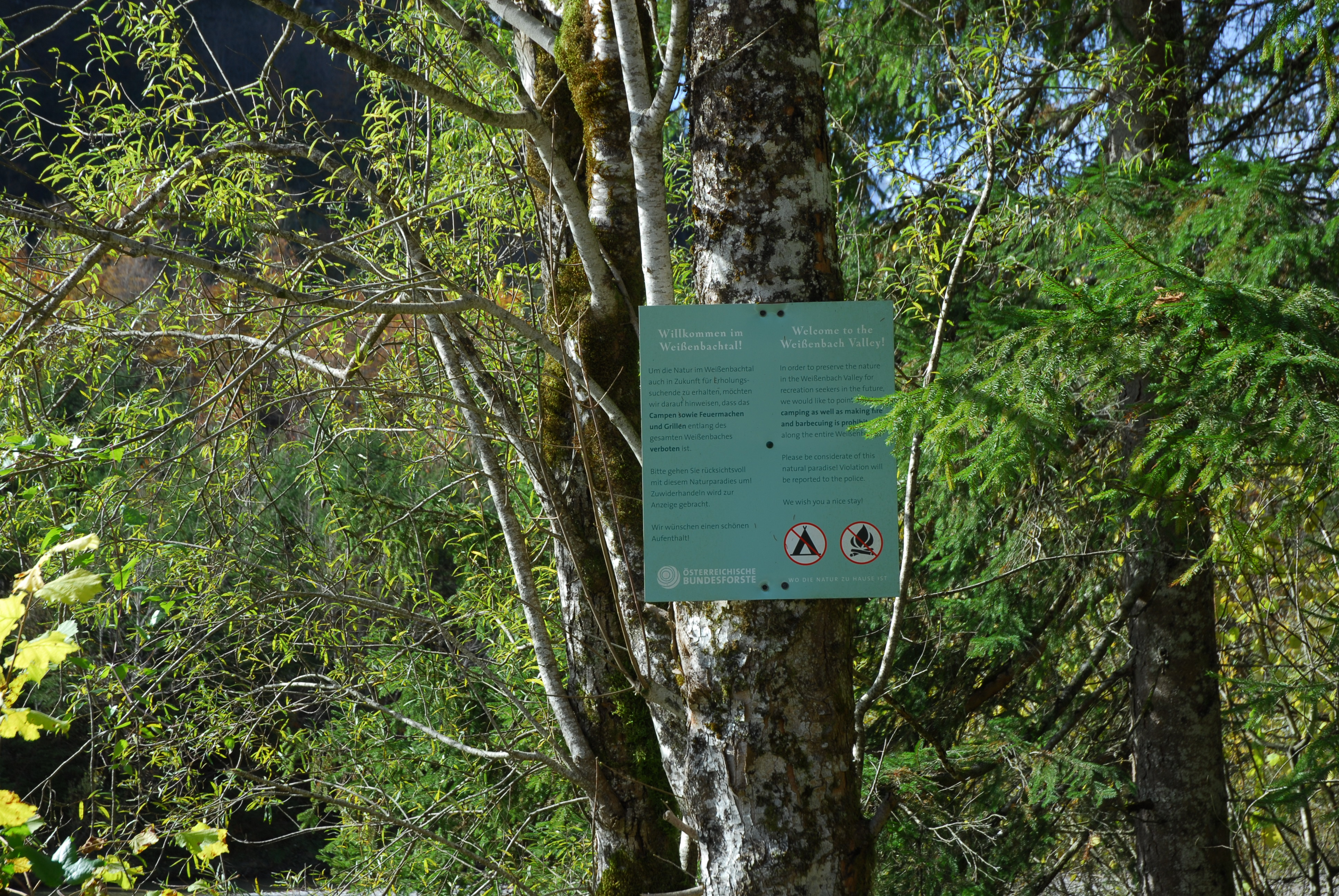
Bilingual sign in the middle of nowhere

English is also becoming increasingly common in everyday life. Although it is not usually mandatory, since the 2010s more and more signs and announcements have been multilingual in English. The government and administration are making efforts to offer their official websites (.gv.at) in English as well. The Legal Information System (RIS for short) already offers all federal and state laws as well as many regulations in English.

Apart from that, the informal influence of English on youth language is particularly significant. It can be observed that, in addition to nouns, many adjectives are also being adopted, creating German-English expressions such as ‘das crazy!’ for ‘das ist verrückt’ (that's crazy) or ‘checkst du?’ for ‘hast du das verstanden?’ (did you understand that?). Similar patterns can also be seen outside of youth language in the business world, where the English term ‘aviation’ for example has almost completely replaced the German term ‘Luftfahrt’.

There have already been attempts in Austrian politics to give English a greater official role. In 2017, for example, the NEOS party made it one of its most important election demands to introduce English as an official language.
