= Europeanisation of law =

In the context of European integration, Europeanisation of law may be interpreted as

- broadening of the scope of European law,
- emergence of new legal disciplines in Europe.

According to Professor Jacques Ziller the Europeanisation of law has three main consequences:

- leads to change in the systems of sources of law in the national legal systems,
- legal systems converge,
- changes legal sciences' methodology.

== See also ==
- Caselex
- European Union law
- Harmonisation of law

== Sources ==
- Ziller, Jacques: Europeanisation of Law: From the Enlargement of the Areas of European Law to a Transformation of the Law of the Member States (L'Européisation Du Droit: De L'Élargissement Des Champs Du Droit De L'Union Européenne À Une Transformation Des Droits Des États Membres), EUI Working Paper LAW No. 2006/19, July 2006
