= EUR-Lex =

Official website of EU Law and documents

EUR-Lex website
- Access to European Union law

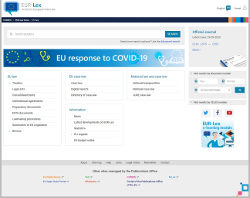
- Screenshot Screenshot of EUR-Lex's portal
- Website type: Public service website and EU legal documents
- Available in: Official languages of the EU
- Owner: European Union
- Creator: Publications Office of the EU
- Website: eur-lex.europa.eu
- Commercial: No
- Registration: Not required
- Launched: 2001
- Content license: Open

EUR-Lex is the official online database of European Union law and other public documents of the European Union (EU), published in 24 official languages of the EU. The Official Journal (OJ) of the European Union is also published on EUR-Lex. Users can access EUR-Lex free of charge and also register for a free account, which offers extra features.

== History ==
Data processing of legal texts at the European Commission started way back in the 1960s, still using punch cards at the time. A system was being developed to capture relationships between documents and analyse them to extract and re-use metadata, but also to make retrieval easier.

Through the years, the system and its scope grew as the Commission started collaborating with other institutions of the European Union and as the Union started expanding. It was named CELEX (Communitatis Europae Lex) and soon became a well-used interinstitutional tool.

While initially used only internally, the system went through various degrees of availability to the public, including offering content under commercial licences via private companies. Finally, in 1997 a web version was launched and named EUR-Lex, hosted by the Publications Office of the European Union.

The EUR-Lex website was opened to the public in 2001, while CELEX still existed as a separate database until the end of 2004. Subsequently, steps were undertaken to merge the two services and to make them completely free of charge.

With the accession of new countries to the European Union and advancements in web and data-processing technologies, the system needed to be improved. A new version was launched in 2004. In 2014 the website saw another major overhaul, including a new database called "CELLAR". "CELLAR" stores in a single place all metadata and digital content managed by the Publications Office in a harmonized and standardized way.

An aligned parallel corpus consisting of 3.9 million EUR-Lex documents in 24 languages, ranging in size from 37 million tokens for Irish to 840 million tokens for English, was produced in 2016 and made available in the Sketch Engine. Unannotated data is provided to researchers under a Creative Commons license. At the time of publication, the authors considered the EUR-Lex Corpus the largest parallel corpus built from European language resources, more suitable for linguistically motivated searches than the EUR-Lex official website.

== Content ==
On EUR-Lex users can access documents in the official EU languages. Language coverage depends on the date of the accession of a country to the EU. All EU law in force on the date of the accession of a new Member State is available in the language of the acceding country as are all documents adopted after this date. Documents repealed or expired before the date of accession are not available in the language of the acceding country.

Irish has been an official EU language since 1 January 2007. However, for practical reasons and on a transitional basis, the institutions of the Union have been exempted from the obligation to draft or translate all acts, including judgments of the Court of Justice, in the Irish language. The derogation was reviewed every five years until Irish received full status as a working language of the EU joining the other 23 official languages of the EU on 1 January 2022. It is gradually reduced according to a timetable annexed to Council Regulation (EU, Euratom) 2015/2264.

While each document (and each language version) is an individual part of the database, the content is grouped into sectors. There are currently 12 sectors, each represented by a number or a letter:

- 1 - Treaties
- 2 – International agreements
- 3 – Legal acts
- 4 – Complementary legislation
- 5 – Preparatory documents
- 6 – Case-law
- 7 – National transposition measures
- 8 – References to national case-law concerning EU law
- 9 – Parliamentary questions
- 0 – Consolidated texts
- C – Other documents published in the Official Journal C series
- E – EFTA documents

=== Official Journal of the European Union ===
In 1998 the Official Journal of the European Union (OJ) started being published online, on EUR-Lex. From 1 July 2013, the digital version of the Official Journal bears legal value instead of the paper version, which is now printed on demand only. The e-OJ has an advanced electronic signature which guarantees its authenticity, integrity and inalterability.

All the editions of the OJ are available on EUR-Lex, dating back to 1952, when they were available in French, Italian, Dutch and German. They can be easily retrieved via a search or by browsing.

=== EU law ===
EUR-Lex contains all EU law (sectors 3 and 4), which can be retrieved by browsing or using the search options. The main types of acts under this heading are EU treaties (sector 1), directives, regulations, decisions as well as consolidated legislation (sector 0), etc. Consolidation is the integration of a basic legal act and all of its successive amendments and corrigenda into one easy-to-read document. Consolidated texts are intended for use as reference and have no legal value.

Acts which require transposition are published with a list of links to information about the national implementing measures (sector 7).

=== Preparatory documents and lawmaking procedures ===
The database contains also documents preceding legal acts, such as legislative proposals, reports, green and white papers, etc. (sector 5). Some proposals never make it past the preparatory stage, but are still available for consultation.

Each legislative procedure is presented in EUR-Lex with a timeline and a list of events and pertaining documents. Procedures can be accessed via the search or from one of the procedure documents.

=== EU case-law ===
These documents, authored by the Court of Justice of the European Union, form sector 6 and include, inter alia, judgments, orders, rulings and opinions of the Advocates General.

=== Other documents ===
EUR-Lex stores also international agreements (sector 2), parliamentary questions (sector 9), EFTA acts, which include also acts by the EFTA Court and by the EFTA Surveillance Authority (sector E); judgments delivered by courts in contracting states and the EU Court of Justice under the Brussels Regime; references to national case law concerning EU law (sector 8) and other public documents.

== CELEX number and other identifiers ==
=== CELEX number ===
While EU documents are numbered in different ways, each of them is assigned a unique, language independent identifier, a CELEX number.

This identifier is composed of the number of the sector, then 4 digits for the year, then one or two letters for the type of document and finally 2-4 digits for the number of the document. For example, the CELEX number of the Waste Electrical and Electronic Equipment Directive is 32012L0019 (3 is the sector, legislation; 2012 is the year of publication in the OJ; L represents EU directives and 0019 is the number under which the directives was published in the OJ).

=== ECLI ===
The European Case Law Identifier (ECLI) was introduced by the council, which concluded that for "identification of judicial decisions a standard identifier should be used which is recognisable, readable and understandable by both humans and computers". Documents can be retrieved using ECLI also on EUR-Lex.

=== ELI ===
EUR-Lex offers also the possibility to retrieve documents by their European Legislation Identifier introduced with Council Conclusions of 10 October 2012 (2012/C 325/02).

== Functionalities ==
=== Search ===
Documents can be retrieved via a search engine (IDOL by HP Autonomy) using various search forms. It is possible to search by document references, dates, text and a multitude of metadata. Registered users have the option of using the expert search and performing searches using Boolean operators.

=== Text display and formats ===
Texts and their metadata can be retrieved, displayed and downloaded in various formats (html, pdf, xml). For simultaneous work with several language versions, users can use the multilingual display, which is especially useful for translation and linguistics.

=== Saved documents and searches ===
Registered users can save documents and searches in their EUR-Lex account, create search and print profiles, and set their own RSS feeds based on saved searches.

=== Preferences ===
Registered users have access to a plethora of settings with which they can customise their experience on the website.

Overview of functionalities
| Functionality | Non-registered users | Registered users |
| Simple and advanced search | YES | YES |
| Expert search (Boolean operators, more options) | NO | YES |
| Saved documents and searches | NO | YES (stored in the account) |
| Website, search, export and print preferences | NO | YES |
| RSS feeds | YES (only predefined) | YES (custom made based on saved searches) |

== Access to national law of EU member states (N-Lex) ==
N-Lex is a common access point to national law of each country of European Union. It is an interface between users and databases of national legislation.

== See also ==
- Caselex
- EudraLex
- European Documentation Centre
- European Union directive
- EuroVoc
- List of European Union directives
- Treaties of the European Union
