= Caselex =

European legal information service

Caselex is a unique legal information service opening up national case law and other important decisions (like those of competition authorities) with a European connotation to legal professions. It was a legaltech before the term even existed. As such it has contributed to the Europeanisation of law. Relying on a network of editors throughout Europe, Caselex systematically summarizes in English case law and other decisions that have a cross border value to legal professionals. The service consists of the Caselex Market Definitions Module and several Case Law Modules.

== Caselex history ==
Caselex was launched as a project financed by the EU Commission in 2005 (Programme IS-ECONTENT - Multiannual Community programme to stimulate the development and use of European digital content on the global networks and to promote linguistic diversity in the Information Society 2001-2005, Grant agreement ID: 11218). It was founded by Stig Marthinsen, with Marc de Vries as project technical coordinator. Stig Marthinsen left the firm in 2011. Legal publisher LexisNexis bought Caselex in 2022. Marc de Vries left Caselex in 2023.

== Caselex Market Definitions Module ==
Defining relevant markets is crucial in concentration control and antitrust cases. The Caselex Market Definitions Module gives user friendly access to English summaries of relevant markets definitions of concentration control decisions rendered by all 34 national and European competition authorities (29 EU Member States, 4 EFTA countries and DG COMP of the European Commission) since 2000 up to today.

Accordingly, by giving an instant synoptic European-wide overview of all relevant markets defined it provides support to lawyers submitting notifications and to competition authorities responsible for concentration control under the EU 2004 Merger Control Regulation as well as national rules thereon. Each product market is searchable on the basis of names of products and NACE codes and each definition backed up by the line of reasoning of the competition authority. Full texts of original decision are also available and downloadable in PDF.

Currently (October 2015), the database holds over 3.500 national and 900 DG COMP decisions holding more than 10.000 market definitions. The launch of this Module is foreseen in January 2016.

== Caselex Case Law Modules ==
Next to that Caselex covers important national case law from all EU Member States Caselex (next to case law from the European Court of Justice). Well structured English summaries allow for instant access to and full understanding of case law that would otherwise not travel across Europe. Currently (October 2015) the Modules hold almost 5.000 summaries covering the following areas of law:

- Competition Law
- Employment Law
- Public procurement Law
- ICT and Media Law
- Social Security Law

== See also ==
- Law of the European Union
- Europeanisation of law
- EUR-Lex
- Harmonisation of law

== Sources ==
- NRC Handelsblad (http://www.nrc.nl/), "Caselex: googelen voor eurojuristen", 14.2.2008
