= Central and Eastern Europe =

Geographical subregion

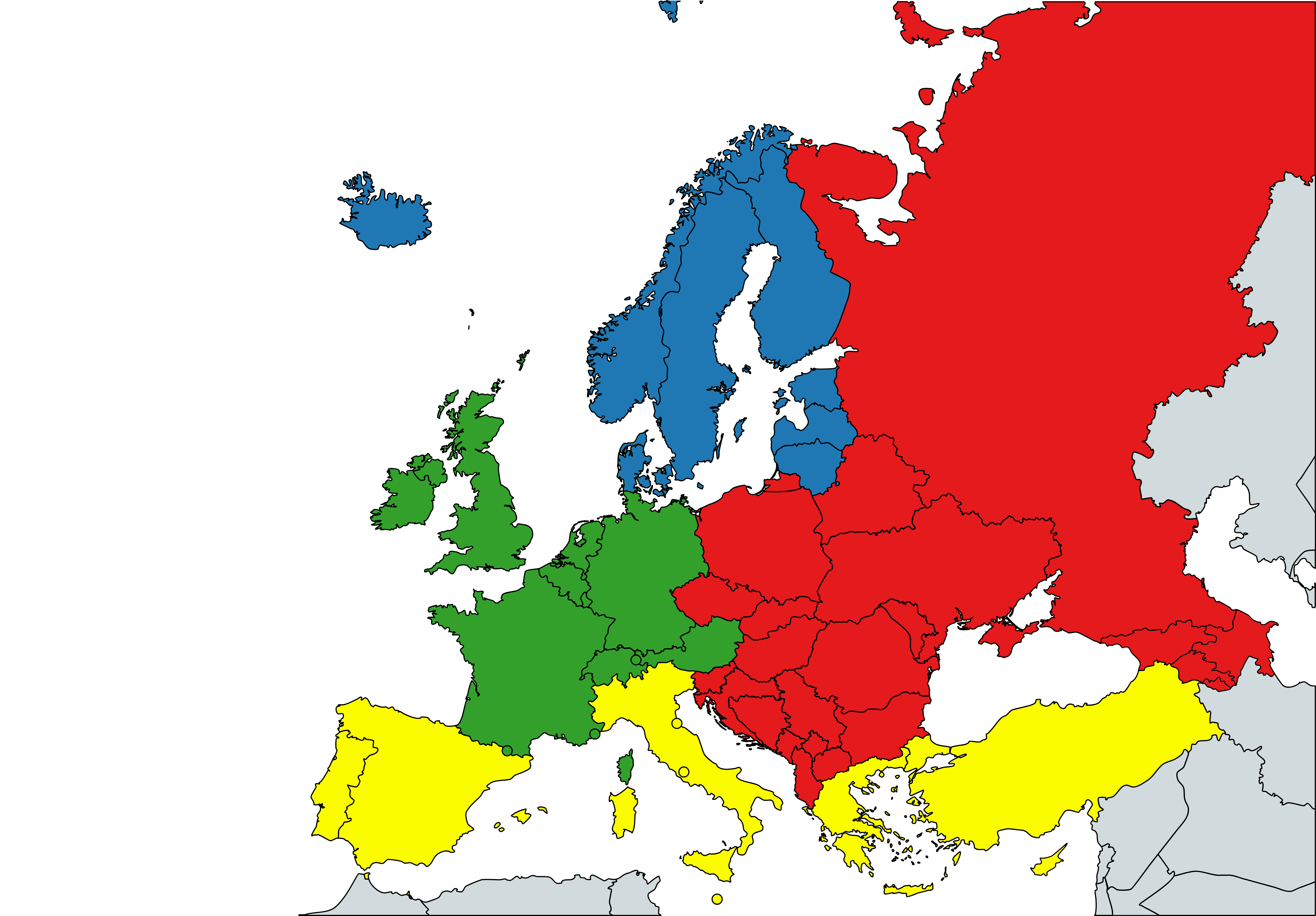
European subregions according to EuroVoc: Central and Eastern Europe Northern Europe Southern Europe Western Europe

Central and Eastern Europe or Central-Eastern Europe (CEE) is a geopolitical term encompassing the countries in Northeast Europe (primarily the Baltics), Central Europe (primarily the Visegrád Group), Eastern Europe, and Southeast Europe (primarily the Balkans), usually meaning former communist states from the Eastern Bloc and Warsaw Pact in Europe, as well as from former Yugoslavia. The Organisation for Economic Co-operation and Development (OECD) also uses the term "Central and Eastern European Countries" (CEECs) for a group comprising some of these countries. This term is sometimes used as an alternative to the term "Eastern Europe," excluding Russia for a more neutral grouping. The region may alternatively be defined as historically the area between the Holy Roman Empire or the Habsburg Empire, the German Empire and the Russian Empire.

== Definitions ==
The term CEE includes the Eastern Bloc (Warsaw Pact) countries west of the post-World War II border with the former Soviet Union; the independent states in former Yugoslavia (which were not considered part of the Eastern bloc); and the three Baltic states – Estonia, Latvia, Lithuania (which chose not to join the CIS with the other 12 former republics of the USSR). The CEE countries are further subdivided by their accession status to the European Union (EU): the eight first-wave accession countries that joined the EU on 1 May 2004 (Estonia, Latvia, Lithuania, Czech Republic, Slovakia, Poland, Hungary, and Slovenia), the two second-wave accession countries that joined on 1 January 2007 (Romania and Bulgaria) and the third-wave accession country that joined on 1 July 2013 (Croatia). According to the World Bank 2008 analysis, the transition to advanced market economies is over for all 10 countries that joined the EU in 2004 and 2007.

The CEE countries include the former socialist states, which extend east of Austria, Germany (eastern part), and Italy; north of Greece and Turkey (European part); south of Finland and Sweden; and west of Belarus, Moldova, Russia, and Ukraine:

Country	European Union	NATO	Notes
Albania	Candidate negotiating	Member state	
Bosnia and Herzegovina	Candidate	Membership Action Plan	
Bulgaria	Member state	Member state	
Croatia	Member state	Member state	
Czech Republic	Member state	Member state	
Estonia	Member state	Member state	
Hungary	Member state	Member state	
Kosovo	Applicant	—N/a	Partially recognized state
Latvia	Member state	Member state	
Lithuania	Member state	Member state	
Montenegro	Candidate negotiating	Member state	
North Macedonia	Candidate negotiating	Member state	
Poland	Member state	Member state	
Romania	Member state	Member state	
Serbia	Candidate negotiating	Individual Partnership Action Plan	
Slovakia	Member state	Member state	
Slovenia	Member state	Member state	
Abkhazia	—N/a	—N/a	Partially recognized state
Armenia	—N/a	Individual Partnership Action Plan	Member state of CIS and CSTO
Azerbaijan	—N/a	Individual Partnership Action Plan	Member state of CIS
Belarus	—N/a	—N/a	Member state of CIS and CSTO
Georgia	Candidate	Intensified Dialogue	
Moldova	Candidate negotiating	Individual Partnership Action Plan	Member state of CIS
Russia	—N/a	—N/a	Member state of CIS and CSTO
South Ossetia	—N/a	—N/a	Partially recognized state
Transnistria	—N/a	—N/a	Partially recognized state
Ukraine	Candidate negotiating	Intensified Dialogue	

According to the Organisation for Economic Co-operation and Development, "Central and Eastern European Countries (CEECs) is an OECD term for the group of countries comprising Albania, Bulgaria, Croatia, the Czech Republic, Hungary, Poland, Romania, the Slovak Republic, Slovenia, and the three Baltic States: Estonia, Latvia and Lithuania."

The term Central and Eastern Europe (abbreviated CEE) has displaced the alternative term East-Central Europe in the context of transition countries, mainly because the abbreviation ECE is ambiguous: it commonly stands for Economic Commission for Europe, rather than East-Central Europe.

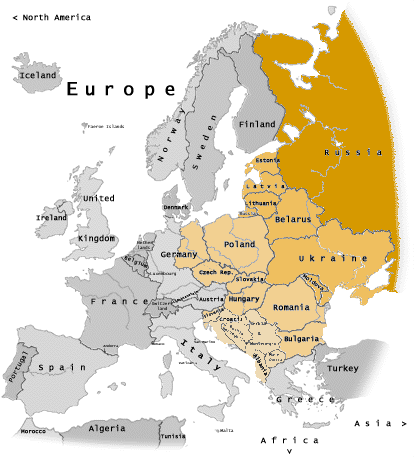
The pre-1989 Eastern Bloc and SFR Yugoslavia (orange) superimposed on 2005 European borders

Central and Eastern European Countries (CEEC) definition used by OECD. Some EU publications only include the EU member states (excluding Albania), others include former Yugoslavia countries.

== See also ==
- Baltic states
- Caucasus
- Central and Eastern European Online Library
- Central Europe
- East-Central Europe
- Eastern Europe
- Eastern European Group
- Eastern Partnership
- European Union
- EuroVoc
- Geographical midpoint of Europe
- Regions of Europe
- Southeast Europe
- Three Seas Initiative
- Visegrád Group
