= Community Research and Development Information Service =

European Commission public repository

The Community Research and Development Information Service (CORDIS) is the European Commission's primary source for the results of projects funded by the EU's framework programmes for research and innovation, from FP1 to Horizon Europe.

The CORDIS website include all public information held by the commission (project fact-sheets, publishable reports, links to publications and deliverables), editorial content (including videos and a podcast) to support dissemination and exploitation, and comprehensive links to external sources such as open access publications and websites.

It is organised in 6 sections:

- Thematic Packs (Different multilingual collections of up-to-date articles about specific research themes. Projects Info Packs are about projects in their early stages, Results Packs are about finished or nearly finished projects, and focus mainly on the specific fields of application of the research results, Synergy Packs bundle projects focusing on the synergies between Horizon Europe and other EU funding programmes)
- Project & Results
- Videos & Podcasts
- News
- Datalab (Different resources to access CORDIS data: Querying CORDIS Linked Open Data through SPARQL and API, interactive maps, visualisation widgets, ...)
- Search interface

It is also possible to browse all CORDIS content by domain of application: these domains regroup articles and projects focusing on how they can be applied in everyday life or industry.

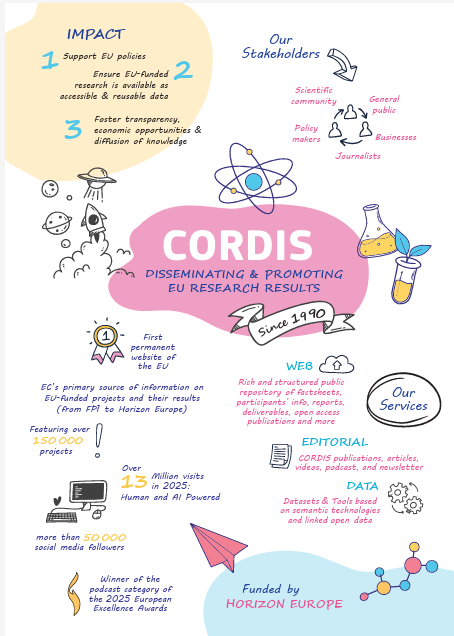
CORDIS at a glance

== Services and activities ==
CORDIS offers access to a broad range of information and services on EU research, including

- A comprehensive public repository containing all project information held by the European Commission, including factsheets, participants, reports, deliverables, and links to open-access publications.
- A variety of articles and publications to explore relevant research results.
- A wide range of features and tools to stay updated with the latest research and innovation projects in Europe.
- A newsletter

The CORDIS website is available in six languages (English, French, German, Italian, Spanish and Polish), although much of the scientific content is only in English.

CORDIS content dates back to the origin of the service in 1990 and the website has been online since 1994, as the first website of the European institutions.

CORDIS content is also available as open data on the European Data Portal

== Organisation and legal basis ==
CORDIS is managed by the Publications Office of the European Union, on behalf of the European Commission's Research and Innovation Directorates-General, Executive Agencies and Joint Undertakings, with support from specialised contractors for editorial, data and technical services.

CORDIS was created in 1990 following a Communication of the commission for the implementation of an RTD information service (SEC(1988)1831).

The legal basis and financing of CORDIS derive from the work programmes of Horizon Europe Framework Programme for Research and Innovation.

== EuroSciVoc ==
CORDIS created the taxonomy of fields of science "EuroSciVoc" (the European Scientific Vocabulary) to organise the information on EU-funded research projects.

It uses Natural Language Processing, semantic technologies and Machine Learning, and it is based on the OECD's Fields of Research and Development (FoRD) classification and the Frascati Manual.

EuroSciVoc is multilingual. At the moment is available in German, English, Spanish, French, Italian and Polish, but translations into all European official languages are planned.

EuroSciVoc is fully integrated into the CORDIS website. Its fields of science can be used as a filter to search for research projects and, from a project factsheet, to browse other projects belonging to the same fields of science.

The taxonomy can be downloaded in SKOS format on the EU Vocabularies Website.

== History ==
The creation of CORDIS was a DG XIII initiative - the Commission decision SEC(88)1831 allowed the service to be first established in 1988. In 1989 the launch of the VALUE Programme provided a convenient vehicle to carry the development of the budding CORDIS service.

The first three databases were established and first published on the ESPRIT Day in November 1990. Users could review R&D Programmes, R&D Projects and R&D Publications using the Common Command Language (CCL) on the ECHO (European Commission Host Organisation) server. This meant that only trained experts could use the service, but nevertheless some 500 user sessions were registered during the first month.

In 2025 CORDIS surpassed the 150 000 projects, and registered more than 13 million visits.

=== Early 90s ===
By the end of the first year in late 1991 three new databases had been added (R&D Acronyms, R&D Results and R&D-related COMdocuments). These six databases could be accessed via a "videotex"-style menu.

The total number of database records had swelled to around 70 000. Some 800 people had registered as CORDIS users and up to 1,000 user sessions were taking place each month. However, CORDIS was still a specialist tool used mainly by librarians and a few other experts who could use the service.

In April 1992, the Council decision for more centralised action under the VALUE2 Programme confirmed the need for CORDIS and gave a boost to its development. The development of a Common Production System (CPS) was initiated to facilitate quality management of all information.

In 1993, three more databases were added (R&D Contacts, R&D Partners and R&D News). The first full release of the CPS was completed, and a CD-ROM of all nine databases was made available. By this time the combined databases contained some 90,000 records, The number of registered users had more than doubled at 2,000 and some 6,000 user sessions per month were being experienced.

=== 1994-1996 ===
1994 was an important year for CORDIS. The launch of the 4th R&D Framework Programme (1994-1998), and within it the Innovation Programme, gave a further explicit mandate to CORDIS.

Strong interest prompted the addition of German and French to the R&D News database, marking the first language addition to an English language environment. Migration onto a new open systems architecture (UNIX-like system, FULCRUM databases, Web and FTP servers) facilitated the introduction of a number of new features - a WWW service, and a user-friendly Windows interface, WatchCORDIS. These measures boosted the system's attractiveness to users. By the end of the year, CORDIS offered some 130 000 database records which encouraged 11 000 registered users to perform nearly 15 000 user sessions per month.

1995-96 was a period of further consolidation and development. The CORDIS databases and web services were fully integrated as the migration into the new Information Dissemination environment (IDS) was completed. On-line host access was integrated into Watch-CORDIS and added to the CD-ROM service, allowing users to work both on-line and off-line coherently. The R&D News service was enriched by adding Italian and Spanish, bringing the offer to five languages. The CORDIS-Focus publication was launched, providing readers with a paper edition of key R&D News articles in three languages - EN, FR & DE.

The first move to cover national R&D information was initiated by Ireland with the start of the EU presidency service. By the end of 1996, CORDIS had 24,000 registered users eager to browse through 152 000 database records and accessing the web pages some 300,000 times per month. A period of rapid growth in numbers of users had been initiated by the move onto the WWW.

=== Late 90s ===
In 1997, Italian and Spanish editions brought the CORDIS focus offer up to five languages. Ireland was succeeded by The Netherlands and Luxembourg as presidency countries and both published their presidency services on CORDIS. A new information monitoring service was launched - 'RAPIDUS - RAPId Delivery of Updates on Search-profiles'.

A pilot project was launched to offer CORDIS as a host for national and regional web services. By the end of the year, user registration no longer seemed so relevant as some 53,000 identified users accessed over 800,000 Web pages per month and downloaded nearly 40,000 documents. It had become clear that CORDIS was no longer a tool reserved for specialists, the spectacular growth in use initiated in 1996 had continued.

In 1998–99, the development of CORDIS continued at a brisk pace. A tenth database was added - the R&D Document Library. The four successive EU presidency countries - UK, Austria, Germany and Finland - published their EU presidency services on CORDIS.

The new fifth R&D Framework Programme was officially launched in February 1999 and confirmed the role of CORDIS as the principal and official common information service for all EU R&D activities.

The Innovation/SMEs programme confirmed the financing of the CORDIS service and also enlarged its scope to cover innovation activities in general and innovation support services in particular. During 1999 there were 130 000 identified users, 300,000 document downloads and some 2.5 million user visits.

=== Early 2000s ===
- 2000: Portuguese and French Presidencies, PAXIS service, redesigned FP5 service, RTD beyond 2002 service
- 2001: Swedish and Belgium Presidencies, Business incubators service, first Innobarometer report and innovation scoreboard, SME Techweb and SME/innovation studies, candidate countries service, FP6 launch
- 2002: Spanish and Danish Presidencies, My CORDIS, CORDIS Express, FP6 & EoI service, official FP6 service and FP6 calls, redesigned CORDIS technology marketplace, CORDIS Wire, Stats: 5 million pages accesses per month, 56 million ‘hits’, 40,000 web pages, 230,000 users per month, 260,000 DB records
- 2003: Greek and Italian Presidencies, redesigned ERA service, FP6 glossary, new ICA search prototype, Science and Society service, IST Results integration, start of introduction of Integrated CORDIS Architecture
- 2004: Irish and Dutch Presidencies, new incubators service, redesigned nanotechnology service. IP and NoE guidance service, Technology platforms,
- 2005: Luxembourg and UK presidencies, New 34 Mbit/s line/ Géant link-up, Polish news service

== Status since 2005 ==
CORDIS's principal aims are stated as:

1. To facilitate participation in Community research activities.
1. To improve exploitation of research results, whilst focusing on sectors essential to Europe's competitiveness.
1. To promote the sharing of know-how in order to boost companies’ innovation capacities, in particular by publishing the results of EU-financed research conducted under successive framework programmes, and the espousal of new technologies by society.

CORDIS offers access to a wide range of information on EU research.
