= European Data Portal =

Official data portal of the European Union

data.europa.eu
- Website type: Public service portal and institutional information
- Available in: 24 official languages of the European Union
- Predecessors: European Data Portal; EU Open Data Portal
- Owner: European Union
- Creator: EU Publications Office
- Website: data.europa.eu
- Commercial: No
- Registration: Not required but soon to be offered for advanced features such as saving queries and receiving alerts
- Launched: 21 April 2021; 5 years ago
- Content license: Creative Commons 'CC‑BY‑4.0' for editorial content; dataset licensing varies

The European Data Portal is a web portal providing open data published by EU Institutions, national portals of EU Member states and non-member states, as well as international organisations of predominantly European scope, launched on April 21, 2021. The portal consolidates datasets previously available via the EU Open Data Portal and the European Data Portal into a single meta-catalogue. The European Data Portal, launched in its beta version on November 16, 2015, was an initiative of the European Commission, and part of the Digital Single Market.

Currently, more than 1,600,000 datasets are published on the portal, originating from 178 catalogues. The portal is a metadata catalogue: in it, metadata from other data and geospatial data catalogues are published following a common ontology, namely the DCAT Application Profile for data portals in Europe (DCAT-AP) with the aim of fostering and facilitating re-use of open data, promotion and support for the publication of (meta)data of high quality and use of Linked Open Data.

The contents of the portal are available in all 24 EU Official Languages and can be freely re-used for any purpose as Open Data, following the specific license terms of datasets.

== Legal basis ==
Directive 2003/98/EC on the re-use of public sector information set the path for both EU and member state portals.

Decision 2006/291/EC on the reuse of Commission documents provided the rules for the opening of the European Commission's data for re-use and was later amended by Commission Decision 2011/833/EU, which committed to making data available in machine-readable formats and established the creation of an EU Open Data Portal, publishing data from all EU Institutions, agencies and bodies.

In 2013, Directive 2013/37/EU and later Directive (EU) 2019/1024, revising the 2003 Directive, established that public sector information shall be available to public for free or at a very low cost by default.

Alongside these Directives, in 2007 the INSPIRE Directive (Directive 2007/2/EC) defined an Infrastructure for Spatial Information in the European Community. The Directive sets forth, via a series of implementing rules, standards for making geo-spatial data interoperable and re-usable among member states and the geo-spatial data community. Many of the geodata portals harvested by data.europa.eu were first created in keeping with the Directive.

The portal is funded by the EU and managed by the Publications Office of the European Union. The Directorate-General for Communications Networks, Content and Technology of the European Commission is responsible for the implementation of EU open data policy, in collaboration with the project's management.

The delivery of the portal is contracted to a consortium of organisations led by Capgemini Invent, including Agiledrop, con terra, Data Excellence, Fraunhofer FOKUS, INTRASOFT International, OMMAX, the Lisbon Council and Timelex.

== Features ==
The portal allows users to access datasets originating from various catalogues, view metadata assessment reports and explore links to similar datasets. Datasets can be viewed as web-pages or as RDF linked data in any of the 24 EU official languages.

In addition to datasets, the portal contains editorial articles related to open data, such as data-stories, news articles, studies and reports. Among these is the Open Data Maturity report, an annual assessment that scores participating countries on four dimensions: policy, portal, quality and impact. Data is gathered through a voluntary questionnaire sent to national open data representatives and validated by the research team. The 2025 edition covered 36 countries, namely the EU member states, the three EFTA countries and six candidate countries, and put the average maturity of the EU-27 at 86 per cent, with policy the most mature dimension (93 per cent) and impact the least (82 per cent).

The data.academy section promotes (open) data literacy by providing free access to courses, videos and learning tools related to themes such as open data licensing, linked open data, data visualisation and more.

A dedicated section offers links to external sources re-using the data, for example for building of dedicated apps.

An API and SPARQL endpoints foster access to metadata in machine-readable format.

== Architecture of the portal ==
In keeping with EU requirements, the portal is built using open-source solutions as much as possible. For example, it uses Drupal as its editorial content management system. Virtuoso is used as a triplestore for the linked-data database, also offering a SPARQL endpoint. Custom software was written ad hoc when a suitable open-source solution could not be found.

Because all metadata is stored using DCAT-AP, specific open-source solutions were developed by the portal to map data from portals using different data-models (e.g. INSPIRE-CSW, CKAN).

== Terms of use ==
Most of the data accessible via data.europa.eu is released by the respective data providers using an open licence. For the most part, data can be used for free for commercial and non-commercial purposes, provided the source is acknowledged. Specific conditions for reuse, relating mostly to the protection of data privacy and intellectual property, apply to a small amount of data. A link to these conditions can be found on every dataset page.

Unless otherwise specified, editorial content published on the portal is released under a Creative Commons 'CC‑BY‑4.0' licence. The portal's copyright notice provides additional information on the terms of use.

As of September 2021, the most common open licences used for contents of the portal are the Creative Commons 'CC‑BY‑4.0' licence, the 'Data licence Germany – attribution' licence or Etalab's Open Licence (used by the French government).
