= Directive on the re-use of public sector information =

European Union directive

Directive 2003/98/EC
- European Union directive
- Title: Directive on the re-use of public sector information
- Made by: European Parliament & Council
- Made under: Art. 95
- Journal reference: L 345, 2003-12-31, pp. 90–96

History
- Date made: 2003-11-17
- Entry into force: 2003-12-31
- Implementation date: 2008-05-08

Preparative texts
- Commission proposal: C 365 E, 2000-12-19, p. 223
- EESC opinion: C 85, 2003-04-08, p. 25
- Reports

Other legislation
- Replaces: —
- Amends: —
- Amended by: Directive (EU) 2019/1024 on open data and the re-use of public sector information
- Replaced by: —

Directive 2003/98/EC on the re-use of public sector information, known as the PSI Directive, now called the Open Data Directive, is an EU directive that stipulates minimum requirements for EU member states regarding making public sector information available for re-use. This directive provides a common legislative framework for this area. The Directive is an attempt to remove barriers that hinder the re-use of public sector information throughout the Union.

The PSI Directive was amended again in 2019, becoming the Open Data Directive (Directive (EU) 2019/1024 on open data and the re-use of public sector information), which entered into force on 16 July 2019. It consisted of a revision of the public sector information directive from 2003, which was already previously amended by the directive 2013/37/EU. Member states had until 16 July 2021 to transpose the new directive into national law.

== Definition ==
Every day public bodies create and collect a massive amount of valuable data from many different domains, the need to open up public sector data is not something new, and the European Union started to stimulate the reuse of public government data since the end of the 1980s.

The directive on open data and the re-use of public sector information further stresses the importance of the principle of re-using and publishing open government data from public sector bodies for both commercial and non-commercial purposes. Even if the directive focused on the re-use principle, in Article 5 it clearly obliged member states to ‘encourage public sector bodies and public undertakings to produce and make available documents [...] in accordance with the principle of “open by design and by default’’. This aspect represented an important step forward because it prioritized and shifted the concept of re-use to the beginning stage in the process of data production. Furthermore, the PSI is clear in terms of who can gain value from the re-use of open government data, making no distinctions about the beneficiaries, and without any restrictions to a specific market or sector.

In addition, the directive specifies that it is not necessary to have and declare a pre-identified purpose for the re-use.

Moreover, another important aspect emerging from the directive, is the idea of information and data as infrastructure. In order to boost innovation and make open government data available for re-use, public bodies need to invest in structuring their data into a public infrastructural resource.

Furthermore, the PSI is clear in terms of who can gain value from the re-use of open government data, making no distinctions about the beneficiaries, and without any restrictions to a specific market or sector. In addition, the directive specifies that it is not necessary to have and declare a pre-identified purpose for the re-use.

=== High Value Datasets ===
Another important aspect is the definition of “High Value Dataset”, which includes information from different thematic topics and is expected to play an important role for the society and economy. Datasets included in this category will have to be published completely and freely in machine-readable format and via Application Programming Interfaces (APIs) in every member state. The availability of APIs stimulates the reuse, dissemination of dynamic data and increases business opportunities. Access to real-time and dynamic data is strongly promoted by the PSI directive, and once the directive will be fully transposed, member states have to publish dynamic open government data through APIs.

These categories of “High Value Dataset”, as referred to in Article 13(1) of the directive, are:

- Geospatial
- Earth observation and environment
- Meteorological
- Statistics
- Companies and company ownership
- Mobility

=== Open data licensing ===
The directive stresses the importance of open data licensing. The public sector is composed of different public bodies which release their open government data using different technical and legal frameworks, unfortunately the different variety of approaches contributes to creating obstacles in the re-use of information. The potential of data, and of open data consequently, emerges from the abilities to connect and link data from heterogeneous data sources. However, when these operations are performed, legal uncertainty and a lack of clarity emerge. As a result, sometimes it is difficult to understand the limitations of the re-use of the datasets clearly. Consequently a clear definition and standardization of open data licenses represent an important pillar in the re-use of open government data. Europe’s open license panorama is highly fragmented with many licenses adopted by the member states. The lack of uniformity in the open licenses may be problematic also from a market perspective as well, and in promoting the use of open data to stimulate the data economy and the Digital Single Market, which is one of the central aims of the PSI directive.

In February 2019, the European Commission decided to standardize the usage of Creative Common licenses as the standards for open licenses under the European Commission’s re-use policy. Creative Commons licenses define how to manage copyright terms related to all creative material under copyright. This decision marks an important step in fostering the re-use of open government data produced by the European Commission and represents a best practice to facilitate the re-use of information that the institution makes publicly available online.

== Transposition and infringement proceedings ==
The deadline for member states to implement the directive was 17 July 2021. Between September 2021 and July 2022 the Commission began infringement proceedings (letters of formal notice and reasoned opinions) against almost half the EU member states:

- Belgium
- Bulgaria
- Czechia
- Croatia
- Hungary
- Latvia
- The Netherlands
- Austria
- Slovakia
- Sweden
- Romania
- Slovenia
