= European Kazakhstan =

Portion of Kazakhstan located in Europe

European Kazakhstan Еуропалық Қазақстан (Kazakh) Европейский Казахстан (Russian)
- Largest city: Oral
- Ethnic groups: Kazakhs; Russian Kazakhs; German Kazakhs
- Demonym: Kazakh

Regions of Kazakhstan

Area
  - Total: 148,000 km^{2} (57,000 sq mi)

Population
  - Census: ~1 million
  - Density: 6.7/km^{2} (17.4/sq mi)

European Kazakhstan (Note: Kazakh: Еуропалық Қазақстан, romanized: Europalyq Qazaqstan; also Қазақстанның еуропалық бөлігі, Qazaqstannyñ europalyq bölıgı; Russian: Европейская часть Казахстана) comprises the territory of Kazakhstan that lies west of the Ural River. The area includes the westernmost parts of West Kazakhstan and Atyrau regions. It is geographically situated in Europe, as opposed to the country's sparsely populated and vastly larger eastern part, which is situated in Central Asia. The Ural River divides Kazakhstan into two parts, bisecting the Eurasian mainland. Oral, the capital of West Kazakhstan Region, is located in the European part of Kazakhstan, while Atyrau, the capital of Atyrau Region, is a transcontinental city.

Despite containing only 5% of Kazakhstan's overall territory, European Kazakhstan's area of 148,000 km^{2} makes Kazakhstan the 14th-largest country in Europe, slightly larger than Greece.

== Area ==
European Kazakhstan covers an area of over 148,000 square kilometres (57,000 mi^{2}), which puts Kazakhstan in 14th place in terms of territory in Europe (according to the Soviet classification of boundaries between Asia and Europe, 381,567 square kilometres (147,324 mi^{2}) and 7th place, respectively). The European part of Kazakhstan is located mainly on the Caspian Depression and the General Syrt upland. On the western and northern sides is the territory of the Russian Federation, on the eastern side it is washed by the Ural River, on the south it is washed by the Caspian Sea and a small part of the Volga Delta.

== Political consequences ==
The European Union is Kazakhstan's largest economic partner, accounting for approximately 30% of its total trade, and receiving 41% of Kazakhstan's exports. Kazakhstan is also a major recipient of foreign direct investment from the EU.

The presence of European territory in Kazakhstan is a strong argument in favor of its European status from a geographical point of view and potential membership in the European Union. In 2009, the Ambassador of Kazakhstan to Russia, Adilbek Dzhaksybekov, stated: "We would like to join the European Union in the future, but not as Estonia and Latvia, but as an equal partner."

Bilateral relations with the European Union are regulated by the Partnership and Cooperation Agreement concluded in 1994. The expansion of Kazakhstan's partnership and cooperation with the European Union and its member states was ratified in the country's parliament in March 2016. Kazakhstan is also part of the EU's Central Asia New Partnership Program.

Currently, Kazakhstan is an observer in the Council of Europe, a full member of the European Commission for Democracy through Law (Venice Commission), a member of the European Higher Education Area, the Union of European Football Associations (UEFA), etc.
