= Publications Office of the European Union =

Academic and legal publisher

(in other official languages)
Bulgarian	Служба за публикации на Европейския съюз
Czech	Úřad pro publikace Evropské unie
Danish	Den Europæiske Unions Publikationskontor
German	Amt für Veröffentlichungen der Europäischen Union
Greek	Υπηρεσία Εκδόσεων της Ευρωπαϊκής Ένωσης
Spanish	Oficina de Publicaciones de la Unión Europea
Estonian	Euroopa Liidu Väljaannete Talitus
Finnish	Euroopan unionin julkaisutoimisto
French	Office des publications de l’Union européenne
Irish	Oifig Foilseachán an Aontais Eorpaigh
Croatian	Ured za publikacije Europske unije
Hungarian	Az Európai Unió Kiadóhivatala
Italian	Ufficio delle pubblicazioni dell’Unione europea
Lithuanian	Europos Sąjungos leidinių biuras
Latvian	Eiropas Savienības Publikāciju birojs
Maltese	Uffiċċju tal-Pubblikazzjonijiet tal-Unjoni Ewropea
Dutch	Bureau voor publicaties van de Europese Unie
Polish	Urząd Publikacji Unii Europejskiej
Portuguese	Serviço das Publicações da União Europeia
Romanian	Oficiul pentru Publicații al Uniunii Europene
Slovak	Úrad pre vydávanie publikácií Európskej únie
Slovene	Urad za publikacije Evropske unije
Swedish	Europeiska unionens publikationsbyrå

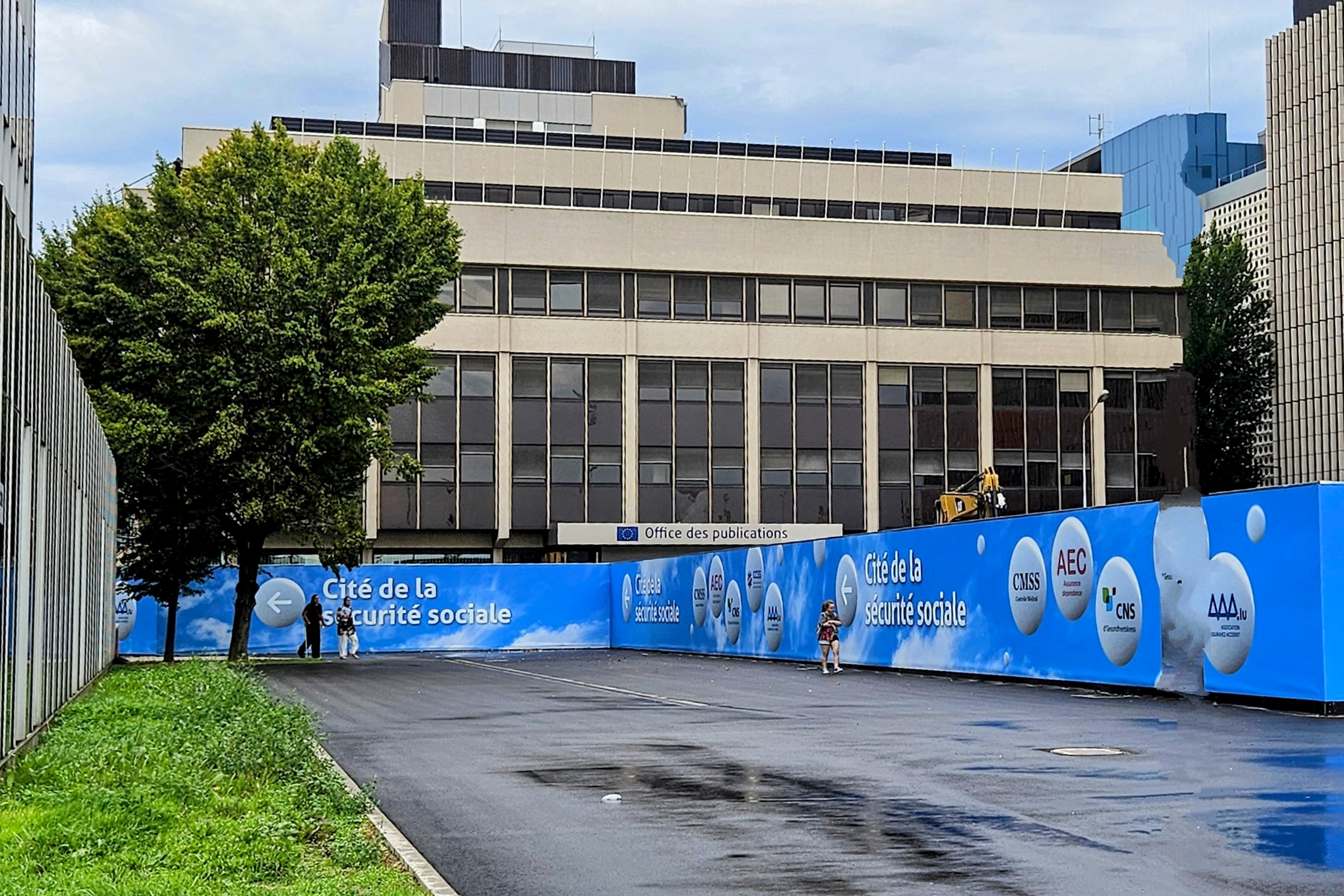
- Former offices in Luxembourg (2023)

Service overview
- Formed: 1969; 57 years ago
- Type: Interinstitutional publisher
- Jurisdiction: European Union
- Headquarters: 20 rue de Reims Luxembourg City
- Employees: 615
- Service executive: Hilde Hardeman, Director-General
- Key documents: Decision 2009/496/EC; Procedure 2012/C 402/05
- Website: op.europa.eu

The Publications Office of the European Union is the official provider of publishing services and data, information and knowledge management services to all EU institutions, bodies and agencies. This makes it the central point of access to EU law, publications, open data, research results, procurement notices, and other official information.

Its mission is to support EU policies and make a broad range of information publicly available as accessible and reusable data. The overall aim is to facilitate transparency, economic activity, and the dissemination of knowledge.

As such, it is the central provider of access to publications of the European Union including legal publications (prominently the Official Journal of the European Union), public procurement notices, open data and applications.

== Functions ==
- Supports the policies and communication activities of the EU institutions and agencies with its services and offers them expertise and synergies in a number of domains.
- Ensures, with its modelling and referencing activities, that the diverse information assets coming from EU institutions take the form of findable, accessible, interoperable and reusable (FAIR) information and data.
- Makes sure that this vast array of official EU information and data – an essential element in today's data-driven economy – is made available to the public to support transparency, economic activity, the development of modern technologies, such as artificial intelligence, and access to knowledge in general.
- Makes sure that this content is preserved and made accessible for future generations.
- Engages with citizens on a regular and increasing basis to help achieve its objectives.

== Main audience ==
The Publications Office's main audience is the public (individuals and businesses).

The Publications Office makes official EU information available to the public as data designed to be findable, accessible, interoperable and reusable (FAIR). According to the Office, this is intended to support transparency, economic activity, the development of technologies such as artificial intelligence, and access to knowledge.

== Collections and services ==
- Community Research and Development Information Service (CORDIS), the European Commission's primary source of results from the projects funded by the EU's framework programmes for research and innovation.
- EUR-Lex, the gateway to EU law, providing free access to, and information about, public legal documents from the European Union.
- TED (Tenders Electronic Daily), the online version of the Supplement to the Official Journal of the European Union, dedicated to European public procurement. It is the official entry point to all business opportunities involving public procurement contracts for values above EU thresholds (EUR 144 000) in the European Union, the European Economic Area and beyond.
- the Publications Office online public access catalogue (OPAC), allowing librarians or other information professionals, to search in more than 330 000 individual bibliographic records and download metadata of their selected publications into their own catalogues.
- the EU Web Archive preserves websites of EU institutions, agencies and bodies. It maintains collections using the Archive-It service:
- data.europa.eu: the official portal for European data
- EU publications website: the publications of EU institutions, agencies and other bodies in various formats
- EU Whoiswho: the directory of the European institutions

== Management Committee ==
The Publications Office of the European Union is managed by its director-general and senior management on the basis of the strategic guidelines set by the management committee.

== See also ==
- Official Journal of the European Union
- EUR-Lex
- data.europa.eu
- EuroVoc
- CORDIS (Community Research & Development Information Service)
